= List of moths of Metropolitan France (P–Z) =

Partial list of moths in Metropolitan France

This is a list of moths of families starting from P to Z that are found in Metropolitan France (including Corsica). It also acts as an index to the species articles and forms part of the full List of Lepidoptera of Metropolitan France.

== Family Peleopodidae ==
- Carcina quercana (Fabricius, 1775)

== Family Plutellidae ==
- Eidophasia aereolella Lhomme, 1949
- Eidophasia insulella Walsingham, 1900
- Eidophasia messingiella (Fischer von Röslerstamm, 1840)
- Eidophasia syenitella Herrich-Schaffer, 1854
- Plutella xylostella (Linnaeus, 1758)
- Plutella geniatella Zeller, 1839
- Plutella huemerella (Baraniak, 2007)
- Plutella porrectella (Linnaeus, 1758)
- Rhigognostis annulatella (Curtis, 1832)
- Rhigognostis hufnagelii (Zeller, 1839)
- Rhigognostis incarnatella (Steudel, 1873)
- Rhigognostis senilella (Zetterstedt, 1839)

== Family Praydidae ==
- Atemelia torquatella (Lienig & Zeller, 1846)
- Distagmos ledereri Herrich-Schaffer, 1854
- Prays citri (Milliere, 1873)
- Prays fraxinella (Bjerkander, 1784)
- Prays oleae (Bernard, 1788)
- Prays ruficeps (Heinemann, 1854)

== Family Prodoxidae ==
- Lampronia aeripennella (Rebel, 1889)
- Lampronia capitella (Clerck, 1759)
- Lampronia corticella (Linnaeus, 1758)
- Lampronia flavimitrella (Hübner, 1817)
- Lampronia fuscatella (Tengstrom, 1848)
- Lampronia luzella (Hübner, 1817)
- Lampronia morosa Zeller, 1852
- Lampronia provectella (Heyden, 1865)
- Lampronia psychidella (Milliere, 1854)
- Lampronia pubicornis (Haworth, 1828)
- Lampronia rupella (Denis & Schiffermuller, 1775)
- Lampronia standfussiella Zeller, 1852

== Family Psychidae ==
- Acanthopsyche atra (Linnaeus, 1767)
- Anaproutia comitella (Bruand, 1853)
- Anaproutia raiblensis (Mann, 1870)
- Apterona crenulella (Bruand, 1853)
- Apterona helicoidella (Vallot, 1827)
- Apterona nylanderi (Wehrli, 1927)
- Bacotia claustrella (Bruand, 1845)
- Bankesia conspurcatella (Zeller, 1850)
- Bankesia deplatsella Nel, 1999
- Bankesia montanella (Walsingham, 1899)
- Bijugis bombycella (Denis & Schiffermuller, 1775)
- Bijugis pectinella (Denis & Schiffermuller, 1775)
- Canephora hirsuta (Poda, 1761)
- Dahlica argenterae (Wehrli, 1924)
- Dahlica caspari Herrmann, 1984
- Dahlica dorotheae Herrmann, 1981
- Dahlica lazuri (Clerck, 1759)
- Dahlica lichenella (Linnaeus, 1761)
- Dahlica rebeli (Wehrli, 1924)
- Dahlica sauteri (Hattenschwiler, 1977)
- Dahlica triquetrella (Hübner, 1813)
- Diplodoma laichartingella Goeze, 1783
- Dissoctena granigerella Staudinger, 1859
- Epichnopterix montanella Heylaerts, 1900
- Epichnopterix plumella (Denis & Schiffermuller, 1775)
- Epichnopterix pontbrillantella (Bruand, 1858)
- Epichnopterix sieboldi (Reutti, 1853)
- Eumasia parietariella (Heydenreich, 1851)
- Leptopterix hirsutella (Denis & Schiffermuller, 1775)
- Leptopterix plumistrella (Hübner, 1793)
- Luffia ferchaultella (Stephens, 1850)
- Luffia lapidella (Goeze, 1783)
- Narycia astrella (Herrich-Schaffer, 1851)
- Narycia duplicella (Goeze, 1783)
- Narycia infernalis Herrmann, 1986
- Oiketicoides febretta (Boyer de Fonscolombe, 1835)
- Oreopsyche tenella (Ad. Speyer, 1862)
- Pachythelia villosella (Ochsenheimer, 1810)
- Penestoglossa dardoinella (Milliere, 1863)
- Phalacropterix apiformis (Rossi, 1790)
- Phalacropterix calberlae (Heylaerts, 1890)
- Phalacropterix graminifera (Fourcroy, 1785)
- Phalacropterix graslinella (Boisduval, 1852)
- Phalacropterix praecellens (Staudinger, 1870)
- Proutia betulina (Zeller, 1839)
- Pseudobankesia alpestrella (Heinemann, 1870)
- Pseudobankesia casaella Hattenschwiler, 1994
- Pseudobankesia gramatella (Lhomme, 1938)
- Pseudobankesia vernella (Constant, 1899)
- Psyche casta (Pallas, 1767)
- Psyche crassiorella Bruand, 1851
- Psyche pyrenaea (Bourgogne, 1961)
- Psychidea nudella (Ochsenheimer, 1810)
- Ptilocephala agrostidis (Schrank, 1802)
- Ptilocephala albida (Esper, 1786)
- Ptilocephala leschenaulti (Staudinger, 1860)
- Ptilocephala lessei (Bourgogne, 1954)
- Ptilocephala muscella (Denis & Schiffermuller, 1775)
- Ptilocephala plumifera (Ochsenheimer, 1810)
- Ptilocephala pyrenaella (Herrich-Schaffer, 1852)
- Ptilocephala sicheliella (Bruand, 1858)
- Ptilocephala silphella (Milliere, 1871)
- Ptilocephala vesubiella (Milliere, 1872)
- Rebelia herrichiella Strand, 1912
- Rebelia surientella (Bruand, 1858)
- Reisseronia tarnierella (Bruand, 1851)
- Siederia alpicolella (Rebel, 1919)
- Siederia listerella (Linnaeus, 1758)
- Sterrhopterix fusca (Haworth, 1809)
- Taleporia defoliella Constant, 1895
- Taleporia politella (Ochsenheimer, 1816)
- Taleporia tubulosa (Retzius, 1783)
- Typhonia ciliaris (Ochsenheimer, 1810)
- Whittleia retiella (Newman, 1847)

== Family Pterolonchidae ==
- Pterolonche albescens Zeller, 1847
- Pterolonche inspersa Staudinger, 1859

== Family Pterophoridae ==
- Adaina microdactyla (Hübner, 1813)
- Agdistis adactyla (Hübner, 1819)
- Agdistis bennetii (Curtis, 1833)
- Agdistis frankeniae (Zeller, 1847)
- Agdistis heydeni (Zeller, 1852)
- Agdistis manicata Staudinger, 1859
- Agdistis meridionalis (Zeller, 1847)
- Agdistis neglecta Arenberger, 1976
- Agdistis paralia (Zeller, 1847)
- Agdistis satanas Milliere, 1875
- Agdistis tamaricis (Zeller, 1847)
- Amblyptilia acanthadactyla (Hübner, 1813)
- Amblyptilia punctidactyla (Haworth, 1811)
- Buckleria paludum (Zeller, 1839)
- Calyciphora acarnella (Walsingham, 1898)
- Calyciphora adamas (Constant, 1895)
- Calyciphora albodactylus (Fabricius, 1794)
- Calyciphora homoiodactyla (Kasy, 1960)
- Calyciphora nephelodactyla (Eversmann, 1844)
- Capperia britanniodactylus (Gregson, 1867)
- Capperia celeusi (Frey, 1886)
- Capperia fusca (O. Hofmann, 1898)
- Capperia hellenica Adamczewski, 1951
- Capperia loranus (Fuchs, 1895)
- Capperia maratonica Adamczewski, 1951
- Capperia polonica Adamczewski, 1951
- Capperia trichodactyla (Denis & Schiffermuller, 1775)
- Cnaemidophorus rhododactyla (Denis & Schiffermuller, 1775)
- Crombrugghia distans (Zeller, 1847)
- Crombrugghia kollari (Stainton, 1851)
- Crombrugghia laetus (Zeller, 1847)
- Crombrugghia tristis (Zeller, 1841)
- Emmelina argoteles (Meyrick, 1922)
- Emmelina monodactyla (Linnaeus, 1758)
- Geina didactyla (Linnaeus, 1758)
- Gillmeria miantodactylus (Zeller, 1841)
- Gillmeria ochrodactyla (Denis & Schiffermuller, 1775)
- Gillmeria pallidactyla (Haworth, 1811)
- Gypsochares baptodactylus (Zeller, 1850)
- Gypsochares bigoti Gibeaux & Nel, 1989
- Hellinsia carphodactyla (Hübner, 1813)
- Hellinsia chrysocomae (Ragonot, 1875)
- Hellinsia didactylites (Strom, 1783)
- Hellinsia distinctus (Herrich-Schaffer, 1855)
- Hellinsia inulae (Zeller, 1852)
- Hellinsia inulaevorus (Gibeaux, 1989)
- Hellinsia lienigianus (Zeller, 1852)
- Hellinsia osteodactylus (Zeller, 1841)
- Hellinsia pectodactylus (Staudinger, 1859)
- Hellinsia tephradactyla (Hübner, 1813)
- Marasmarcha fauna (Milliere, 1876)
- Marasmarcha lunaedactyla (Haworth, 1811)
- Marasmarcha oxydactylus (Staudinger, 1859)
- Merrifieldia baliodactylus (Zeller, 1841)
- Merrifieldia leucodactyla (Denis & Schiffermuller, 1775)
- Merrifieldia malacodactylus (Zeller, 1847)
- Merrifieldia semiodactylus (Mann, 1855)
- Merrifieldia tridactyla (Linnaeus, 1758)
- Oidaematophorus constanti Ragonot, 1875
- Oidaematophorus giganteus (Mann, 1855)
- Oidaematophorus lithodactyla (Treitschke, 1833)
- Oidaematophorus rogenhoferi (Mann, 1871)
- Oxyptilus chrysodactyla (Denis & Schiffermuller, 1775)
- Oxyptilus ericetorum (Stainton, 1851)
- Oxyptilus parvidactyla (Haworth, 1811)
- Oxyptilus pilosellae (Zeller, 1841)
- Paraplatyptilia metzneri (Zeller, 1841)
- Platyptilia calodactyla (Denis & Schiffermuller, 1775)
- Platyptilia farfarellus Zeller, 1867
- Platyptilia gonodactyla (Denis & Schiffermuller, 1775)
- Platyptilia isodactylus (Zeller, 1852)
- Platyptilia nemoralis Zeller, 1841
- Platyptilia tesseradactyla (Linnaeus, 1761)
- Porrittia galactodactyla (Denis & Schiffermuller, 1775)
- Procapperia linariae (Chretien, 1922)
- Procapperia maculatus (Constant, 1865)
- Pselnophorus heterodactyla (Muller, 1764)
- Pterophorus ischnodactyla (Treitschke, 1835)
- Pterophorus pentadactyla (Linnaeus, 1758)
- Puerphorus olbiadactylus (Milliere, 1859)
- Stangeia siceliota (Zeller, 1847)
- Stenoptilia annadactyla Sutter, 1988
- Stenoptilia aridus (Zeller, 1847)
- Stenoptilia bipunctidactyla (Scopoli, 1763)
- Stenoptilia coprodactylus (Stainton, 1851)
- Stenoptilia elkefi Arenberger, 1984
- Stenoptilia gratiolae Gibeaux & Nel, 1990
- Stenoptilia lutescens (Herrich-Schaffer, 1855)
- Stenoptilia millieridactylus (Bruand, 1861)
- Stenoptilia mimula Gibeaux, 1985
- Stenoptilia nepetellae Bigot & Picard, 1983
- Stenoptilia pelidnodactyla (Stein, 1837)
- Stenoptilia pneumonanthes (Buttner, 1880)
- Stenoptilia pterodactyla (Linnaeus, 1761)
- Stenoptilia stigmatodactylus (Zeller, 1852)
- Stenoptilia zophodactylus (Duponchel, 1840)
- Stenoptilodes taprobanes (Felder & Rogenhofer, 1875)
- Tabulaephorus punctinervis (Constant, 1885)
- Wheeleria obsoletus (Zeller, 1841)
- Wheeleria raphiodactyla (Rebel, 1901)
- Wheeleria spilodactylus (Curtis, 1827)

== Family Pyralidae ==
- Achroia grisella (Fabricius, 1794)
- Acrobasis advenella (Zincken, 1818)
- Acrobasis bithynella Zeller, 1848
- Acrobasis centunculella (Mann, 1859)
- Acrobasis consociella (Hübner, 1813)
- Acrobasis dulcella (Zeller, 1848)
- Acrobasis fallouella (Ragonot, 1871)
- Acrobasis glaucella Staudinger, 1859
- Acrobasis legatea (Haworth, 1811)
- Acrobasis marmorea (Haworth, 1811)
- Acrobasis obliqua (Zeller, 1847)
- Acrobasis obtusella (Hübner, 1796)
- Acrobasis porphyrella (Duponchel, 1836)
- Acrobasis repandana (Fabricius, 1798)
- Acrobasis romanella (Milliere, 1870)
- Acrobasis sodalella Zeller, 1848
- Acrobasis suavella (Zincken, 1818)
- Acrobasis tumidana (Denis & Schiffermuller, 1775)
- Aglossa brabanti Ragonot, 1884
- Aglossa caprealis (Hübner, 1809)
- Aglossa pinguinalis (Linnaeus, 1758)
- Aglossa rabatalis (de Joannis, 1923)
- Alophia combustella (Herrich-Schaffer, 1855)
- Amphithrix sublineatella (Staudinger, 1859)
- Ancylosis arenosella (Staudinger, 1859)
- Ancylosis cinnamomella (Duponchel, 1836)
- Ancylosis imitella Hampson, 1901
- Ancylosis morbosella Staudinger, 1879
- Ancylosis oblitella (Zeller, 1848)
- Ancylosis roscidella (Eversmann, 1844)
- Ancylosis sareptalla (Herrich-Schaffer, 1861)
- Anerastia lotella (Hübner, 1813)
- Aphomia sociella (Linnaeus, 1758)
- Aphomia zelleri de Joannis, 1932
- Apomyelois bistriatella (Hulst, 1887)
- Apomyelois ceratoniae (Zeller, 1839)
- Apomyelois decolor (Zeller, 1881)
- Asalebria florella (Mann, 1862)
- Asalebria venustella (Ragonot, 1887)
- Asarta aethiopella (Duponchel, 1837)
- Asarta alpicolella (Zeller, 1839)
- Asartodes monspesulalis (Duponchel, 1834)
- Asartodes zapateri (Ragonot, 1882)
- Assara conicolella (Constant, 1884)
- Assara terebrella (Zincken, 1818)
- Bostra obsoletalis (Mann, 1884)
- Bradyrrhoa cantenerella (Duponchel, 1837)
- Bradyrrhoa confiniella Zeller, 1848
- Bradyrrhoa marianella Ragonot, 1887
- Bradyrrhoa trapezella (Duponchel, 1836)
- Cadra abstersella (Zeller, 1847)
- Cadra calidella (Guenee, 1845)
- Cadra cautella (Walker, 1863)
- Cadra figulilella (Gregson, 1871)
- Cadra furcatella (Herrich-Schaffer, 1849)
- Catastia marginea (Denis & Schiffermuller, 1775)
- Corcyra cephalonica (Stainton, 1866)
- Cryptoblabes bistriga (Haworth, 1811)
- Cryptoblabes gnidiella (Milliere, 1867)
- Delplanqueia cortella (Constant, 1884)
- Delplanqueia dilutella (Denis & Schiffermuller, 1775)
- Delplanqueia inscriptella (Duponchel, 1836)
- Denticera divisella (Duponchel, 1842)
- Dioryctria abietella (Denis & Schiffermuller, 1775)
- Dioryctria mendacella (Staudinger, 1859)
- Dioryctria pineae (Staudinger, 1859)
- Dioryctria robiniella (Milliere, 1865)
- Dioryctria schuetzeella Fuchs, 1899
- Dioryctria simplicella Heinemann, 1863
- Dioryctria sylvestrella (Ratzeburg, 1840)
- Eccopisa effractella Zeller, 1848
- Elegia fallax (Staudinger, 1881)
- Elegia similella (Zincken, 1818)
- Ematheudes punctella (Treitschke, 1833)
- Endotricha flammealis (Denis & Schiffermuller, 1775)
- Ephestia disparella Hampson, 1901
- Ephestia elutella (Hübner, 1796)
- Ephestia kuehniella Zeller, 1879
- Ephestia mistralella (Milliere, 1874)
- Ephestia parasitella Staudinger, 1859
- Ephestia unicolorella Staudinger, 1881
- Ephestia welseriella (Zeller, 1848)
- Epischnia adultella Zeller, 1848
- Epischnia agnieleae Leraut, 2003
- Epischnia asteris Staudinger, 1870
- Epischnia illotella Zeller, 1839
- Epischnia prodromella (Hübner, 1799)
- Episcythrastis tabidella (Mann, 1864)
- Episcythrastis tetricella (Denis & Schiffermuller, 1775)
- Etiella zinckenella (Treitschke, 1832)
- Eucarphia vinetella (Fabricius, 1787)
- Eurhodope cirrigerella (Zincken, 1818)
- Eurhodope cruentella (Duponchel, 1843)
- Eurhodope rosella (Scopoli, 1763)
- Euzophera bigella (Zeller, 1848)
- Euzophera cinerosella (Zeller, 1839)
- Euzophera fuliginosella (Heinemann, 1865)
- Euzophera lunulella (O. Costa, 1836)
- Euzophera osseatella (Treitschke, 1832)
- Euzophera pinguis (Haworth, 1811)
- Euzopherodes charlottae (Rebel, 1914)
- Euzopherodes vapidella (Mann, 1857)
- Galleria mellonella (Linnaeus, 1758)
- Glyptoteles leucacrinella Zeller, 1848
- Gymnancyla canella (Denis & Schiffermuller, 1775)
- Gymnancyla hornigii (Lederer, 1852)
- Gymnancyla ruscinonella Ragonot, 1888
- Homoeosoma incognitellum Roesler, 1965
- Homoeosoma inustella Ragonot, 1884
- Homoeosoma nebulella (Denis & Schiffermuller, 1775)
- Homoeosoma nimbella (Duponchel, 1837)
- Homoeosoma sinuella (Fabricius, 1794)
- Hypochalcia ahenella (Denis & Schiffermuller, 1775)
- Hypochalcia decorella (Hübner, 1810)
- Hypochalcia dignella (Hübner, 1796)
- Hypochalcia lignella (Hübner, 1796)
- Hypochalcia propinquella (Guenee, 1845)
- Hypotia corticalis (Denis & Schiffermuller, 1775)
- Hypotia massilialis (Duponchel, 1832)
- Hypotia pectinalis (Herrich-Schaffer, 1838)
- Hypsopygia costalis (Fabricius, 1775)
- Hypsopygia fulvocilialis (Duponchel, 1834)
- Hypsopygia glaucinalis (Linnaeus, 1758)
- Hypsopygia incarnatalis (Zeller, 1847)
- Hypsopygia rubidalis (Denis & Schiffermuller, 1775)
- Hypsotropa limbella Zeller, 1848
- Hypsotropa vulneratella (Zeller, 1847)
- Isauria dilucidella (Duponchel, 1836)
- Khorassania compositella (Treitschke, 1835)
- Lamoria anella (Denis & Schiffermuller, 1775)
- Laodamia faecella (Zeller, 1839)
- Loryma egregialis (Herrich-Schaffer, 1838)
- Lymphia chalybella (Eversmann, 1844)
- Matilella fusca (Haworth, 1811)
- Megasis rippertella (Zeller, 1839)
- Merulempista cingillella (Zeller, 1846)
- Merulempista ragonoti Rothschild, 1913
- Merulempista turturella (Zeller, 1848)
- Metallostichodes bicolorella (Heinemann, 1864)
- Metallostichodes nigrocyanella (Constant, 1865)
- Moitrelia hispanella Staudinger, 1859
- Moitrelia italogallicella (Milliere, 1882)
- Moitrelia obductella (Zeller, 1839)
- Myelois circumvoluta (Fourcroy, 1785)
- Myelois cribratella Zeller, 1847
- Myrlaea albistrigata (Staudinger, 1881)
- Nephopterix angustella (Hübner, 1796)
- Neurotomia coenulentella (Zeller, 1846)
- Nyctegretis aenigmella Leraut, 2002
- Nyctegretis lineana (Scopoli, 1786)
- Nyctegretis ruminella La Harpe, 1860
- Oncocera semirubella (Scopoli, 1763)
- Ortholepis betulae (Goeze, 1778)
- Oxybia transversella (Duponchel, 1836)
- Paralipsa gularis (Zeller, 1877)
- Pempelia albariella Zeller, 1839
- Pempelia alpigenella (Duponchel, 1836)
- Pempelia brephiella (Staudinger, 1879)
- Pempelia genistella (Duponchel, 1836)
- Pempelia palumbella (Denis & Schiffermuller, 1775)
- Pempeliella ardosiella (Ragonot, 1887)
- Pempeliella bayassensis Leraut, 2001
- Pempeliella matilella Leraut, 2001
- Pempeliella ornatella (Denis & Schiffermuller, 1775)
- Pempeliella sororiella Zeller, 1839
- Phycita coronatella (Guenee, 1845)
- Phycita metzneri (Zeller, 1846)
- Phycita roborella (Denis & Schiffermuller, 1775)
- Phycitodes albatella (Ragonot, 1887)
- Phycitodes binaevella (Hübner, 1813)
- Phycitodes eliseannae Leraut, 2002
- Phycitodes gallicella Leraut, 2002
- Phycitodes inquinatella (Ragonot, 1887)
- Phycitodes lacteella (Rothschild, 1915)
- Phycitodes maritima (Tengstrom, 1848)
- Phycitodes saxicola (Vaughan, 1870)
- Pima boisduvaliella (Guenee, 1845)
- Plodia interpunctella (Hübner, 1813)
- Pseudacrobasis nankingella Roesler, 1975
- Psorosa dahliella (Treitschke, 1832)
- Psorosa mediterranella Amsel, 1953
- Pterothrixidia rufella (Duponchel, 1836)
- Pyralis farinalis (Linnaeus, 1758)
- Pyralis lienigialis (Zeller, 1843)
- Pyralis regalis Denis & Schiffermuller, 1775
- Raphimetopus ablutella (Zeller, 1839)
- Rhodophaea formosa (Haworth, 1811)
- Salebriopsis albicilla (Herrich-Schaffer, 1849)
- Saluria maculivittella Ragonot, 1887
- Sciota adelphella (Fischer v. Röslerstamm, 1836)
- Sciota fumella (Eversmann, 1844)
- Sciota hostilis (Stephens, 1834)
- Sciota rhenella (Zincken, 1818)
- Seeboldia korgosella Ragonot, 1887
- Selagia argyrella (Denis & Schiffermuller, 1775)
- Selagia fuscorubra Riel, 1928
- Selagia spadicella (Hübner, 1796)
- Stemmatophora borgialis (Duponchel, 1832)
- Stemmatophora brunnealis (Treitschke, 1829)
- Stemmatophora combustalis (Fischer v. Röslerstamm, 1842)
- Stemmatophora syriacalis (Ragonot, 1895)
- Synaphe antennalis (Fabricius, 1794)
- Synaphe bombycalis (Denis & Schiffermuller, 1775)
- Synaphe diffidalis (Guenee, 1854)
- Synaphe punctalis (Fabricius, 1775)
- Trachonitis cristella (Denis & Schiffermuller, 1775)
- Tretopteryx pertusalis (Geyer, 1832)
- Tsaraphycis mimeticella (Staudinger, 1879)
- Valdovecaria bradyrrhoella Zerny, 1927
- Valdovecaria hispanicella (Herrich-Schaffer, 1855)
- Valdovecaria umbratella (Treitschke, 1832)
- Vitula biviella (Zeller, 1848)
- Zophodia grossulariella (Hübner, 1809)

== Family Roeslerstammiidae ==
- Roeslerstammia erxlebella (Fabricius, 1787)
- Roeslerstammia pronubella (Denis & Schiffermuller, 1775)

== Family Saturniidae ==
- Actias isabellae (Graells, 1849)
- Aglia tau (Linnaeus, 1758)
- Samia cynthia (Drury, 1773)
- Saturnia pavonia (Linnaeus, 1758)
- Saturnia pyri (Denis & Schiffermuller, 1775)

== Family Schreckensteiniidae ==
- Schreckensteinia festaliella (Hübner, 1819)

== Family Scythrididae ==
- Enolmis acanthella (Godart, 1824)
- Enolmis agenjoi Passerin d'Entreves, 1988
- Episcythris triangulella (Ragonot, 1874)
- Scythris adustella Jackh, 1978
- Scythris amphonycella (Geyer, 1836)
- Scythris anomaloptera (Staudinger, 1880)
- Scythris apicalis (Zeller, 1847)
- Scythris arenbergeri Passerin d'Entreves, 1986
- Scythris aspromontis Jackh, 1978
- Scythris bifissella (O. Hofmann, 1889)
- Scythris binotiferella (Ragonot, 1880)
- Scythris bornicensis Jackh, 1977
- Scythris carboniella Jackh, 1978
- Scythris cicadella (Zeller, 1839)
- Scythris cistorum (Milliere, 1876)
- Scythris clavella (Zeller, 1855)
- Scythris constanti Walsingham, 1898
- Scythris corsa Passerin d'Entreves, 1986
- Scythris crassiuscula (Herrich-Schaffer, 1855)
- Scythris cupreella (Staudinger, 1859)
- Scythris cuspidella (Denis & Schiffermuller, 1775)
- Scythris disparella (Tengstrom, 1848)
- Scythris dissimilella (Herrich-Schaffer, 1855)
- Scythris dorycniella (Milliere, 1861)
- Scythris empetrella Karsholt & Nielsen, 1976
- Scythris ericetella (Heinemann, 1872)
- Scythris ericivorella (Ragonot, 1880)
- Scythris fallacella (Schlager, 1847)
- Scythris flavidella Preissecker, 1911
- Scythris flavilaterella (Fuchs, 1886)
- Scythris flaviventrella (Herrich-Schaffer, 1855)
- Scythris fuscoaenea (Haworth, 1828)
- Scythris fuscopterella Bengtsson, 1977
- Scythris glacialis (Frey, 1870)
- Scythris grandipennis (Haworth, 1828)
- Scythris gravatella (Zeller, 1847)
- Scythris heinemanni (Moschler, 1869)
- Scythris imperiella Jackh, 1978
- Scythris inertella (Zeller, 1855)
- Scythris inspersella (Hübner, 1817)
- Scythris insulella (Staudinger, 1859)
- Scythris knochella (Fabricius, 1794)
- Scythris lafauryi Passerin d'Entreves, 1986
- Scythris laminella (Denis & Schiffermuller, 1775)
- Scythris lampyrella (Constant, 1865)
- Scythris lempkei Bengtsson & Langohr, 1989
- Scythris lhommei Bengtsson & Passerin d'Entreves, 1988
- Scythris limbella (Fabricius, 1775)
- Scythris mariannae Bengtsson, 1991
- Scythris meanderis Bengtsson, 1997
- Scythris mediella (Constant, 1855)
- Scythris mus Walsingham, 1898
- Scythris noricella (Zeller, 1843)
- Scythris obscurella (Scopoli, 1763)
- Scythris palustris (Zeller, 1855)
- Scythris parafuscoaenea Bengtsson, 1991
- Scythris pascuella (Zeller, 1855)
- Scythris penicillata (Chretien, 1900)
- Scythris picaepennis (Haworth, 1828)
- Scythris potentillella (Zeller, 1847)
- Scythris productella (Zeller, 1839)
- Scythris punctivittella (O. Costa, 1836)
- Scythris ridiculella Caradja, 1920
- Scythris rouxella (Constant, 1865)
- Scythris sappadensis Bengtsson, 1992
- Scythris saxella Bengtsson, 1991
- Scythris schawerdae Rebel, 1931
- Scythris schleichiella (Zeller, 1870)
- Scythris scipionella (Staudinger, 1859)
- Scythris scopolella (Linnaeus, 1767)
- Scythris scorpionella Jackh, 1977
- Scythris seliniella (Zeller, 1839)
- Scythris siccella (Zeller, 1839)
- Scythris speyeri (Heinemann & Wocke, 1876)
- Scythris subseliniella (Heinemann, 1876)
- Scythris subsiccella Bengtsson, 1997
- Scythris tabidella (Herrich-Schaffer, 1855)
- Scythris tenuivittella (Stainton, 1867)
- Scythris tergestinella (Zeller, 1855)
- Scythris tributella (Zeller, 1847)
- Scythris vartianae Kasy, 1962
- Scythris ventosella Chretien, 1907
- Scythris vittella (O. Costa, 1834)

== Family Sesiidae ==
- Bembecia albanensis (Rebel, 1918)
- Bembecia fibigeri Z. Lastuvka & A. Lastuvka, 1994
- Bembecia himmighoffeni (Staudinger, 1866)
- Bembecia iberica Spatenka, 1992
- Bembecia ichneumoniformis (Denis & Schiffermuller, 1775)
- Bembecia megillaeformis (Hübner, 1813)
- Bembecia psoraleae Bartsch & Bettag, 1997
- Bembecia scopigera (Scopoli, 1763)
- Bembecia sirphiformis (Lucas, 1849)
- Bembecia tunetana (Le Cerf, 1920)
- Bembecia uroceriformis (Treitschke, 1834)
- Chamaesphecia aerifrons (Zeller, 1847)
- Chamaesphecia anthraciformis (Rambur, 1832)
- Chamaesphecia bibioniformis (Esper, 1800)
- Chamaesphecia dumonti Le Cerf, 1922
- Chamaesphecia empiformis (Esper, 1783)
- Chamaesphecia euceraeformis (Ochsenheimer, 1816)
- Chamaesphecia leucopsiformis (Esper, 1800)
- Chamaesphecia mysiniformis (Boisduval, 1840)
- Chamaesphecia nigrifrons (Le Cerf, 1911)
- Chamaesphecia osmiaeformis (Herrich-Schaffer, 1848)
- Chamaesphecia palustris Kautz, 1927
- Chamaesphecia ramburi (Staudinger, 1866)
- Chamaesphecia tenthrediniformis (Denis & Schiffermuller, 1775)
- Paranthrene insolitus Le Cerf, 1914
- Paranthrene tabaniformis (Rottemburg, 1775)
- Pennisetia hylaeiformis (Laspeyres, 1801)
- Pyropteron affinis (Staudinger, 1856)
- Pyropteron chrysidiformis (Esper, 1782)
- Pyropteron hispanica (Kallies, 1999)
- Pyropteron leucomelaena (Zeller, 1847)
- Pyropteron meriaeformis (Boisduval, 1840)
- Pyropteron muscaeformis (Esper, 1783)
- Pyropteron triannuliformis (Freyer, 1843)
- Sesia apiformis (Clerck, 1759)
- Sesia bembeciformis (Hübner, 1806)
- Sesia melanocephala Dalman, 1816
- Synanthedon andrenaeformis (Laspeyres, 1801)
- Synanthedon cephiformis (Ochsenheimer, 1808)
- Synanthedon codeti (Oberthur, 1881)
- Synanthedon conopiformis (Esper, 1782)
- Synanthedon culiciformis (Linnaeus, 1758)
- Synanthedon flaviventris (Staudinger, 1883)
- Synanthedon formicaeformis (Esper, 1783)
- Synanthedon loranthi (Kralicek, 1966)
- Synanthedon melliniformis (Laspeyres, 1801)
- Synanthedon mesiaeformis (Herrich-Schaffer, 1846)
- Synanthedon myopaeformis (Borkhausen, 1789)
- Synanthedon scoliaeformis (Borkhausen, 1789)
- Synanthedon soffneri Spatenka, 1983
- Synanthedon spheciformis (Denis & Schiffermuller, 1775)
- Synanthedon spuleri (Fuchs, 1908)
- Synanthedon stomoxiformis (Hübner, 1790)
- Synanthedon tipuliformis (Clerck, 1759)
- Synanthedon vespiformis (Linnaeus, 1761)
- Tinthia tineiformis (Esper, 1789)

== Family Sphingidae ==
- Acherontia atropos (Linnaeus, 1758)
- Agrius convolvuli (Linnaeus, 1758)
- Daphnis nerii (Linnaeus, 1758)
- Deilephila elpenor (Linnaeus, 1758)
- Deilephila porcellus (Linnaeus, 1758)
- Hemaris fuciformis (Linnaeus, 1758)
- Hemaris tityus (Linnaeus, 1758)
- Hippotion celerio (Linnaeus, 1758)
- Hyles dahlii (Geyer, 1828)
- Hyles euphorbiae (Linnaeus, 1758)
- Hyles gallii (Rottemburg, 1775)
- Hyles hippophaes (Esper, 1789)
- Hyles livornica (Esper, 1780)
- Hyles nicaea (de Prunner, 1798)
- Hyles vespertilio (Esper, 1780)
- Laothoe populi (Linnaeus, 1758)
- Macroglossum stellatarum (Linnaeus, 1758)
- Marumba quercus (Denis & Schiffermuller, 1775)
- Mimas tiliae (Linnaeus, 1758)
- Proserpinus proserpina (Pallas, 1772)
- Smerinthus ocellata (Linnaeus, 1758)
- Sphinx ligustri Linnaeus, 1758
- Sphinx maurorum (Jordan, 1931)
- Sphinx pinastri Linnaeus, 1758

== Family Stathmopodidae ==
- Neomariania partinicensis (Rebel, 1937)
- Stathmopoda pedella (Linnaeus, 1761)

== Family Thyrididae ==
- Thyris fenestrella (Scopoli, 1763)

== Family Tineidae ==
- Anomalotinea liguriella (Milliere, 1879)
- Archinemapogon yildizae Kocak, 1981
- Ateliotum hungaricellum Zeller, 1839
- Ateliotum insulare (Rebel, 1896)
- Ateliotum petrinella (Herrich-Schaffer, 1854)
- Cephimallota crassiflavella Bruand, 1851
- Elatobia fuliginosella (Lienig & Zeller, 1846)
- Eudarcia glaseri (Petersen, 1967)
- Eudarcia leopoldella (O. G. Costa, 1836)
- Eudarcia mensella (Walsingham, 1900)
- Eudarcia nigraella (Mariani, 1937)
- Eudarcia pagenstecherella (Hübner, 1825)
- Euplocamus anthracinalis (Scopoli, 1763)
- Haplotinea insectella (Fabricius, 1794)
- Infurcitinea albicomella (Stainton, 1851)
- Infurcitinea argentimaculella (Stainton, 1849)
- Infurcitinea atrifasciella (Staudinger, 1871)
- Infurcitinea captans Gozmany, 1960
- Infurcitinea finalis Gozmany, 1959
- Infurcitinea gaedikella Nel, 2003
- Infurcitinea ignicomella (Zeller, 1852)
- Infurcitinea italica (Amsel, 1954)
- Infurcitinea klimeschi Passerin d'Entreves, 1974
- Infurcitinea marcunella (Rebel, 1910)
- Infurcitinea parentii Petersen, 1964
- Infurcitinea roesslerella (Heyden, 1865)
- Infurcitinea rumelicella (Rebel, 1903)
- Infurcitinea sardica (Amsel, 1952)
- Infurcitinea sardiniella Vari, 1942
- Infurcitinea teriolella (Amsel, 1954)
- Infurcitinea vartianae Petersen, 1962
- Infurcitinea walsinghami Petersen, 1962
- Ischnoscia borreonella (Milliere, 1874)
- Ischnoscia pandorella (Milliere, 1880)
- Karsholtia marianii (Rebel, 1936)
- Lichenotinea maculata Petersen, 1957
- Lichenotinea pustulatella (Zeller, 1852)
- Metatinea immaculatella (Rebel, 1892)
- Monopis crocicapitella (Clemens, 1859)
- Monopis imella (Hübner, 1813)
- Monopis laevigella (Denis & Schiffermuller, 1775)
- Monopis monachella (Hübner, 1796)
- Monopis obviella (Denis & Schiffermuller, 1775)
- Monopis weaverella (Scott, 1858)
- Montetinea montana Petersen, 1957
- Morophaga choragella (Denis & Schiffermuller, 1775)
- Myrmecozela ataxella (Chretien, 1905)
- Myrmecozela ochraceella (Tengstrom, 1848)
- Nemapogon agenjoi Petersen, 1959
- Nemapogon clematella (Fabricius, 1781)
- Nemapogon falstriella (Bang-Haas, 1881)
- Nemapogon fuscalbella (Chretien, 1908)
- Nemapogon granella (Linnaeus, 1758)
- Nemapogon inconditella (Lucas, 1956)
- Nemapogon nigralbella (Zeller, 1839)
- Nemapogon picarella (Clerck, 1759)
- Nemapogon ruricolella (Stainton, 1849)
- Nemapogon variatella (Clemens, 1859)
- Nemapogon wolffiella Karsholt & Nielsen, 1976
- Neurothaumasia ankerella (Mann, 1867)
- Niditinea fuscella (Linnaeus, 1758)
- Niditinea striolella (Matsumura, 1931)
- Novotinea carbonifera (Walsingham, 1900)
- Novotinea liguriella Amsel, 1950
- Opogona sacchari (Bojer, 1856)
- Rhodobates unicolor (Staudinger, 1870)
- Stenoptinea cyaneimarmorella (Milliere, 1854)
- Tenaga nigripunctella (Haworth, 1828)
- Tenaga rhenania (Petersen, 1962)
- Tinea basifasciella Ragonot, 1895
- Tinea columbariella Wocke, 1877
- Tinea dubiella Stainton, 1859
- Tinea flavescentella Haworth, 1828
- Tinea murariella Staudinger, 1859
- Tinea nonimella (Zagulajev, 1955)
- Tinea pallescentella Stainton, 1851
- Tinea pellionella Linnaeus, 1758
- Tinea semifulvella Haworth, 1828
- Tinea translucens Meyrick, 1917
- Tinea trinotella Thunberg, 1794
- Triaxomasia caprimulgella (Stainton, 1851)
- Triaxomera fulvimitrella (Sodoffsky, 1830)
- Triaxomera parasitella (Hübner, 1796)
- Trichophaga bipartitella (Ragonot, 1892)
- Trichophaga tapetzella (Linnaeus, 1758)

== Family Tischeriidae ==
- Coptotriche angusticollella (Duponchel, 1843)
- Coptotriche gaunacella (Duponchel, 1843)
- Coptotriche heinemanni (Wocke, 1871)
- Coptotriche marginea (Haworth, 1828)
- Tischeria decidua Wocke, 1876
- Tischeria dodonaea Stainton, 1858
- Tischeria ekebladella (Bjerkander, 1795)

== Family Tortricidae ==
- Acleris abietana (Hübner, 1822)
- Acleris aspersana (Hübner, 1817)
- Acleris bergmanniana (Linnaeus, 1758)
- Acleris comariana (Lienig & Zeller, 1846)
- Acleris cristana (Denis & Schiffermuller, 1775)
- Acleris emargana (Fabricius, 1775)
- Acleris ferrugana (Denis & Schiffermuller, 1775)
- Acleris fimbriana (Thunberg, 1791)
- Acleris forsskaleana (Linnaeus, 1758)
- Acleris hastiana (Linnaeus, 1758)
- Acleris hippophaeana (Heyden, 1865)
- Acleris holmiana (Linnaeus, 1758)
- Acleris hyemana (Haworth, 1811)
- Acleris kochiella (Goeze, 1783)
- Acleris laterana (Fabricius, 1794)
- Acleris lipsiana (Denis & Schiffermuller, 1775)
- Acleris literana (Linnaeus, 1758)
- Acleris logiana (Clerck, 1759)
- Acleris lorquiniana (Duponchel, 1835)
- Acleris maccana (Treitschke, 1835)
- Acleris notana (Donovan, 1806)
- Acleris permutana (Duponchel, 1836)
- Acleris quercinana (Zeller, 1849)
- Acleris rhombana (Denis & Schiffermuller, 1775)
- Acleris roscidana (Hübner, 1799)
- Acleris rufana (Denis & Schiffermuller, 1775)
- Acleris scabrana (Denis & Schiffermuller, 1775)
- Acleris schalleriana (Linnaeus, 1761)
- Acleris shepherdana (Stephens, 1852)
- Acleris sparsana (Denis & Schiffermuller, 1775)
- Acleris umbrana (Hübner, 1799)
- Acleris variegana (Denis & Schiffermuller, 1775)
- Acroclita subsequana (Herrich-Schaffer, 1851)
- Adoxophyes orana (Fischer v. Röslerstamm, 1834)
- Aethes ardezana (Muller-Rutz, 1922)
- Aethes beatricella (Walsingham, 1898)
- Aethes bilbaensis (Rossler, 1877)
- Aethes cnicana (Westwood, 1854)
- Aethes deaurana (Peyerimhoff, 1877)
- Aethes decimana (Denis & Schiffermuller, 1775)
- Aethes deutschiana (Zetterstedt, 1839)
- Aethes dilucidana (Stephens, 1852)
- Aethes fennicana (M. Hering, 1924)
- Aethes flagellana (Duponchel, 1836)
- Aethes francillana (Fabricius, 1794)
- Aethes hartmanniana (Clerck, 1759)
- Aethes kindermanniana (Treitschke, 1830)
- Aethes languidana (Mann, 1855)
- Aethes margaritana (Haworth, 1811)
- Aethes margarotana (Duponchel, 1836)
- Aethes moribundana (Staudinger, 1859)
- Aethes pemeantensis Gibeaux, 1985
- Aethes piercei Obraztsov, 1952
- Aethes rubigana (Treitschke, 1830)
- Aethes rutilana (Hübner, 1817)
- Aethes sanguinana (Treitschke, 1830)
- Aethes smeathmanniana (Fabricius, 1781)
- Aethes tesserana (Denis & Schiffermuller, 1775)
- Aethes tornella (Walsingham, 1898)
- Aethes triangulana (Treitschke, 1835)
- Aethes williana (Brahm, 1791)
- Agapeta hamana (Linnaeus, 1758)
- Agapeta largana (Rebel, 1906)
- Agapeta zoegana (Linnaeus, 1767)
- Aleimma loeflingiana (Linnaeus, 1758)
- Ancylis achatana (Denis & Schiffermuller, 1775)
- Ancylis apicella (Denis & Schiffermuller, 1775)
- Ancylis badiana (Denis & Schiffermuller, 1775)
- Ancylis comptana (Frolich, 1828)
- Ancylis geminana (Donovan, 1806)
- Ancylis laetana (Fabricius, 1775)
- Ancylis mitterbacheriana (Denis & Schiffermuller, 1775)
- Ancylis myrtillana (Treitschke, 1830)
- Ancylis obtusana (Haworth, 1811)
- Ancylis selenana (Guenee, 1845)
- Ancylis sparulana (Staudinger, 1859)
- Ancylis uncella (Denis & Schiffermuller, 1775)
- Ancylis unculana (Haworth, 1811)
- Ancylis unguicella (Linnaeus, 1758)
- Ancylis upupana (Treitschke, 1835)
- Aneuxanthis locupletana (Hübner, 1819)
- Aphelia viburniana (Denis & Schiffermuller, 1775)
- Aphelia ferugana (Hübner, 1793)
- Aphelia paleana (Hübner, 1793)
- Aphelia unitana (Hübner, 1799)
- Apotomis capreana (Hübner, 1817)
- Apotomis infida (Heinrich, 1926)
- Apotomis lineana (Denis & Schiffermuller, 1775)
- Apotomis sauciana (Frolich, 1828)
- Apotomis semifasciana (Haworth, 1811)
- Apotomis sororculana (Zetterstedt, 1839)
- Apotomis turbidana Hübner, 1825
- Archips crataegana (Hübner, 1799)
- Archips oporana (Linnaeus, 1758)
- Archips podana (Scopoli, 1763)
- Archips rosana (Linnaeus, 1758)
- Archips xylosteana (Linnaeus, 1758)
- Argyroploce arbutella (Linnaeus, 1758)
- Argyroploce externa (Eversmann, 1844)
- Argyroploce noricana (Herrich-Schaffer, 1851)
- Argyrotaenia ljungiana (Thunberg, 1797)
- Aterpia anderreggana Guenee, 1845
- Aterpia corticana (Denis & Schiffermuller, 1775)
- Avaria hyerana (Milliere, 1858)
- Bactra bactrana (Kennel, 1901)
- Bactra furfurana (Haworth, 1811)
- Bactra lancealana (Hübner, 1799)
- Bactra robustana (Christoph, 1872)
- Bactra venosana (Zeller, 1847)
- Barbara herrichiana Obraztsov, 1960
- Cacoecimorpha pronubana (Hübner, 1799)
- Capricornia boisduvaliana (Duponchel, 1836)
- Capua vulgana (Frolich, 1828)
- Celypha aurofasciana (Haworth, 1811)
- Celypha capreolana (Herrich-Schaffer, 1851)
- Celypha cespitana (Hübner, 1817)
- Celypha doubledayana (Barrett, 1872)
- Celypha flavipalpana (Herrich-Schaffer, 1851)
- Celypha lacunana (Denis & Schiffermuller, 1775)
- Celypha rivulana (Scopoli, 1763)
- Celypha rosaceana Schlager, 1847
- Celypha rufana (Scopoli, 1763)
- Celypha rurestrana (Duponchel, 1843)
- Celypha siderana (Treitschke, 1835)
- Celypha striana (Denis & Schiffermuller, 1775)
- Celypha woodiana (Barrett, 1882)
- Choristoneura diversana (Hübner, 1817)
- Choristoneura hebenstreitella (Muller, 1764)
- Choristoneura lafauryana (Ragonot, 1875)
- Choristoneura murinana (Hübner, 1799)
- Clavigesta purdeyi (Durrant, 1911)
- Clavigesta sylvestrana (Curtis, 1850)
- Clepsis consimilana (Hübner, 1817)
- Clepsis dumicolana (Zeller, 1847)
- Clepsis neglectana (Herrich-Schaffer, 1851)
- Clepsis pallidana (Fabricius, 1776)
- Clepsis rogana (Guenee, 1845)
- Clepsis rurinana (Linnaeus, 1758)
- Clepsis senecionana (Hübner, 1819)
- Clepsis siciliana (Ragonot, 1894)
- Clepsis spectrana (Treitschke, 1830)
- Clepsis steineriana (Hübner, 1799)
- Clepsis unicolorana (Duponchel, 1835)
- Cnephasia alticolana (Herrich-Schaffer, 1851)
- Cnephasia asseclana (Denis & Schiffermuller, 1775)
- Cnephasia bizensis Real, 1953
- Cnephasia chrysantheana (Duponchel, 1843)
- Cnephasia communana (Herrich-Schaffer, 1851)
- Cnephasia conspersana Douglas, 1846
- Cnephasia cupressivorana (Staudinger, 1871)
- Cnephasia ecullyana Real, 1951
- Cnephasia fragosana (Zeller, 1847)
- Cnephasia fulturata Rebel, 1940
- Cnephasia genitalana Pierce & Metcalfe, 1922
- Cnephasia longana (Haworth, 1811)
- Cnephasia pasiuana (Hübner, 1799)
- Cnephasia sedana (Constant, 1884)
- Cnephasia stephensiana (Doubleday, 1849)
- Cnephasia abrasana (Duponchel, 1843)
- Cnephasia incertana (Treitschke, 1835)
- Cochylidia heydeniana (Herrich-Schaffer, 1851)
- Cochylidia implicitana (Wocke, 1856)
- Cochylidia rupicola (Curtis, 1834)
- Cochylidia subroseana (Haworth, 1811)
- Cochylimorpha alternana (Stephens, 1834)
- Cochylimorpha cultana (Lederer, 1855)
- Cochylimorpha decolorella (Zeller, 1839)
- Cochylimorpha elongana (Fischer v. Röslerstamm, 1839)
- Cochylimorpha erlebachi Huemer & Trematerra, 1997
- Cochylimorpha halophilana (Christoph, 1872)
- Cochylimorpha hilarana (Herrich-Schaffer, 1851)
- Cochylimorpha jucundana (Treitschke, 1835)
- Cochylimorpha meridiana (Staudinger, 1859)
- Cochylimorpha perfusana (Guenee, 1845)
- Cochylimorpha peucedana (Ragonot, 1889)
- Cochylimorpha straminea (Haworth, 1811)
- Cochylimorpha tiraculana (Bassi & Scaramozzino, 1989)
- Cochylimorpha woliniana (Schleich, 1868)
- Cochylis atricapitana (Stephens, 1852)
- Cochylis dubitana (Hübner, 1799)
- Cochylis epilinana Duponchel, 1842
- Cochylis flaviciliana (Westwood, 1854)
- Cochylis hoffmannana (Kearfott, 1907)
- Cochylis hybridella (Hübner, 1813)
- Cochylis molliculana Zeller, 1847
- Cochylis nana (Haworth, 1811)
- Cochylis pallidana Zeller, 1847
- Cochylis posterana Zeller, 1847
- Cochylis roseana (Haworth, 1811)
- Cochylis salebrana (Mann, 1862)
- Commophila aeneana (Hübner, 1800)
- Corticivora piniana (Herrich-Schaffer, 1851)
- Crocidosema plebejana Zeller, 1847
- Cydia adenocarpi (Ragonot, 1875)
- Cydia albipicta (Sauter, 1968)
- Cydia amplana (Hübner, 1800)
- Cydia conicolana (Heylaerts, 1874)
- Cydia coniferana (Saxesen, 1840)
- Cydia corollana (Hübner, 1823)
- Cydia cosmophorana (Treitschke, 1835)
- Cydia derrai Prose, 1988
- Cydia duplicana (Zetterstedt, 1839)
- Cydia exquisitana (Rebel, 1889)
- Cydia fagiglandana (Zeller, 1841)
- Cydia ilipulana (Walsingham, 1903)
- Cydia illutana (Herrich-Schaffer, 1851)
- Cydia indivisa (Danilevsky, 1963)
- Cydia inquinatana (Hübner, 1800)
- Cydia interscindana (Moschler, 1866)
- Cydia intexta (Kuznetsov, 1962)
- Cydia leguminana (Lienig & Zeller, 1846)
- Cydia medicaginis (Kuznetsov, 1962)
- Cydia microgrammana (Guenee, 1845)
- Cydia millenniana (Adamczewski, 1967)
- Cydia nigricana (Fabricius, 1794)
- Cydia pactolana (Zeller, 1840)
- Cydia pomonella (Linnaeus, 1758)
- Cydia semicinctana (Kennel, 1901)
- Cydia servillana (Duponchel, 1836)
- Cydia splendana (Hübner, 1799)
- Cydia strigulatana (Kennel, 1899)
- Cydia strobilella (Linnaeus, 1758)
- Cydia succedana (Denis & Schiffermuller, 1775)
- Cydia ulicetana (Haworth, 1811)
- Cydia vallesiaca (Sauter, 1968)
- Cymolomia hartigiana (Saxesen, 1840)
- Diceratura amaranthica Razowski, 1963
- Diceratura infantana (Kennel, 1899)
- Diceratura ostrinana (Guenee, 1845)
- Diceratura rhodograpta Djakonov, 1929
- Diceratura roseofasciana (Mann, 1855)
- Dichrorampha acuminatana (Lienig & Zeller, 1846)
- Dichrorampha aeratana (Pierce & Metcalfe, 1915)
- Dichrorampha agilana (Tengstrom, 1848)
- Dichrorampha alexandrae Passerin d'Entreves, 1972
- Dichrorampha alpigenana (Heinemann, 1863)
- Dichrorampha alpinana (Treitschke, 1830)
- Dichrorampha bugnionana (Duponchel, 1843)
- Dichrorampha cacaleana (Herrich-Schaffer, 1851)
- Dichrorampha chavanneana (de La Harpe, 1858)
- Dichrorampha consortana Stephens, 1852
- Dichrorampha distinctana (Heinemann, 1863)
- Dichrorampha eximia (Danilevsky, 1948)
- Dichrorampha flavidorsana Knaggs, 1867
- Dichrorampha forsteri Obraztsov, 1953
- Dichrorampha gemellana (Zeller, 1847)
- Dichrorampha gruneriana (Herrich-Schaffer, 1851)
- Dichrorampha harpeana Frey, 1870
- Dichrorampha heegerana (Duponchel, 1843)
- Dichrorampha incursana (Herrich-Schaffer, 1851)
- Dichrorampha ligulana (Herrich-Schaffer, 1851)
- Dichrorampha montanana (Duponchel, 1843)
- Dichrorampha petiverella (Linnaeus, 1758)
- Dichrorampha plumbagana (Treitschke, 1830)
- Dichrorampha plumbana (Scopoli, 1763)
- Dichrorampha sedatana Busck, 1906
- Dichrorampha senectana Guenee, 1845
- Dichrorampha sequana (Hübner, 1799)
- Dichrorampha simpliciana (Haworth, 1811)
- Dichrorampha sylvicolana Heinemann, 1863
- Dichrorampha thomanni Huemer, 1991
- Dichrorampha vancouverana McDunnough, 1935
- Ditula angustiorana (Haworth, 1811)
- Ditula joannisiana (Ragonot, 1888)
- Eana clercana (de Joannis, 1908)
- Eana cottiana (Chretien, 1898)
- Eana cyanescana (Real, 1953)
- Eana derivana (de La Harpe, 1858)
- Eana incanana (Stephens, 1852)
- Eana jaechki Razowski, 1959
- Eana joannisi (Schawerda, 1929)
- Eana nevadensis (Schawerda, 1929)
- Eana penziana (Thunberg, 1791)
- Eana viardi (Real, 1953)
- Eana argentana (Clerck, 1759)
- Eana osseana (Scopoli, 1763)
- Eana canescana (Guenee, 1845)
- Eana filipjevi (Real, 1953)
- Enarmonia formosana (Scopoli, 1763)
- Endothenia ericetana (Humphreys & Westwood, 1845)
- Endothenia gentianaeana (Hübner, 1799)
- Endothenia lapideana (Herrich-Schaffer, 1851)
- Endothenia marginana (Haworth, 1811)
- Endothenia nigricostana (Haworth, 1811)
- Endothenia oblongana (Haworth, 1811)
- Endothenia pauperculana (Staudinger, 1859)
- Endothenia pullana (Haworth, 1811)
- Endothenia quadrimaculana (Haworth, 1811)
- Endothenia ustulana (Haworth, 1811)
- Epagoge grotiana (Fabricius, 1781)
- Epiblema chretieni Obraztsov, 1952
- Epiblema costipunctana (Haworth, 1811)
- Epiblema foenella (Linnaeus, 1758)
- Epiblema grandaevana (Lienig & Zeller, 1846)
- Epiblema graphana (Treitschke, 1835)
- Epiblema hepaticana (Treitschke, 1835)
- Epiblema inulivora (Meyrick, 1932)
- Epiblema sarmatana (Christoph, 1872)
- Epiblema scutulana (Denis & Schiffermuller, 1775)
- Epiblema similana (Denis & Schiffermuller, 1775)
- Epiblema simploniana (Duponchel, 1835)
- Epiblema sticticana (Fabricius, 1794)
- Epiblema turbidana (Treitschke, 1835)
- Epinotia abbreviana (Fabricius, 1794)
- Epinotia bilunana (Haworth, 1811)
- Epinotia brunnichana (Linnaeus, 1767)
- Epinotia caprana (Fabricius, 1798)
- Epinotia cedricida Diakonoff, 1969
- Epinotia crenana (Hübner, 1799)
- Epinotia cruciana (Linnaeus, 1761)
- Epinotia dalmatana (Rebel, 1891)
- Epinotia demarniana (Fischer v. Röslerstamm, 1840)
- Epinotia festivana (Hübner, 1799)
- Epinotia fraternana (Haworth, 1811)
- Epinotia granitana (Herrich-Schaffer, 1851)
- Epinotia immundana (Fischer v. Röslerstamm, 1839)
- Epinotia maculana (Fabricius, 1775)
- Epinotia mercuriana (Frolich, 1828)
- Epinotia nanana (Treitschke, 1835)
- Epinotia nemorivaga (Tengstrom, 1848)
- Epinotia nigricana (Herrich-Schaffer, 1851)
- Epinotia nisella (Clerck, 1759)
- Epinotia pusillana (Peyerimhoff, 1863)
- Epinotia pygmaeana (Hübner, 1799)
- Epinotia ramella (Linnaeus, 1758)
- Epinotia rubiginosana (Herrich-Schaffer, 1851)
- Epinotia signatana (Douglas, 1845)
- Epinotia solandriana (Linnaeus, 1758)
- Epinotia sordidana (Hübner, 1824)
- Epinotia subocellana (Donovan, 1806)
- Epinotia subsequana (Haworth, 1811)
- Epinotia tedella (Clerck, 1759)
- Epinotia tenerana (Denis & Schiffermuller, 1775)
- Epinotia tetraquetrana (Haworth, 1811)
- Epinotia thapsiana (Zeller, 1847)
- Epinotia trigonella (Linnaeus, 1758)
- Eriopsela quadrana (Hübner, 1813)
- Eucosma aemulana (Schlager, 1849)
- Eucosma albidulana (Herrich-Schaffer, 1851)
- Eucosma albuneana (Zeller, 1847)
- Eucosma aspidiscana (Hübner, 1817)
- Eucosma balatonana (Osthelder, 1937)
- Eucosma campoliliana (Denis & Schiffermuller, 1775)
- Eucosma cana (Haworth, 1811)
- Eucosma conterminana (Guenee, 1845)
- Eucosma cumulana (Guenee, 1845)
- Eucosma diakonoffi Gibeaux, 1984
- Eucosma fervidana (Zeller, 1847)
- Eucosma gradensis (Galvagni, 1909)
- Eucosma hohenwartiana (Denis & Schiffermuller, 1775)
- Eucosma incinerana (Constant, 1888)
- Eucosma lacteana (Treitschke, 1835)
- Eucosma luciana (Chretien, 1908)
- Eucosma lugubrana (Treitschke, 1830)
- Eucosma metzneriana (Treitschke, 1830)
- Eucosma mirificana (Peyerimhoff, 1876)
- Eucosma monstratana (Rebel, 1906)
- Eucosma obumbratana (Lienig & Zeller, 1846)
- Eucosma parvulana (Wilkinson, 1859)
- Eucosma pupillana (Clerck, 1759)
- Eucosma rubescana (Constant, 1895)
- Eucosma tripoliana (Barrett, 1880)
- Eucosma wimmerana (Treitschke, 1835)
- Eucosmomorpha albersana (Hübner, 1813)
- Eudemis porphyrana (Hübner, 1799)
- Eudemis profundana (Denis & Schiffermuller, 1775)
- Eugnosta lathoniana (Hübner, 1800)
- Eugnosta magnificana (Rebel, 1914)
- Eugnosta parreyssiana (Duponchel, 1843)
- Eulia ministrana (Linnaeus, 1758)
- Eupoecilia ambiguella (Hübner, 1796)
- Eupoecilia angustana (Hübner, 1799)
- Eupoecilia cebrana (Hübner, 1813)
- Eupoecilia sanguisorbana (Herrich-Schaffer, 1856)
- Exapate duratella Heyden, 1864
- Falseuncaria degreyana (McLachlan, 1869)
- Falseuncaria ruficiliana (Haworth, 1811)
- Fulvoclysia nerminae Kocak, 1982
- Gibberifera simplana (Fischer v. Röslerstamm, 1836)
- Grapholita andabatana (Wolff, 1957)
- Grapholita funebrana Treitschke, 1835
- Grapholita janthinana (Duponchel, 1843)
- Grapholita lobarzewskii (Nowicki, 1860)
- Grapholita molesta (Busck, 1916)
- Grapholita tenebrosana Duponchel, 1843
- Grapholita aureolana Tengstrom, 1848
- Grapholita caecana Schlager, 1847
- Grapholita compositella (Fabricius, 1775)
- Grapholita coronillana Lienig & Zeller, 1846
- Grapholita delineana Walker, 1863
- Grapholita difficilana (Walsingham, 1900)
- Grapholita discretana Wocke, 1861
- Grapholita fissana (Frolich, 1828)
- Grapholita gemmiferana Treitschke, 1835
- Grapholita internana (Guenee, 1845)
- Grapholita jungiella (Clerck, 1759)
- Grapholita lathyrana (Hübner, 1822)
- Grapholita lunulana (Denis & Schiffermuller, 1775)
- Grapholita nebritana Treitschke, 1830
- Grapholita orobana Treitschke, 1830
- Grapholita pallifrontana Lienig & Zeller, 1846
- Gravitarmata margarotana (Heinemann, 1863)
- Gynnidomorpha alismana (Ragonot, 1883)
- Gynnidomorpha luridana (Gregson, 1870)
- Gynnidomorpha minimana (Caradja, 1916)
- Gynnidomorpha permixtana (Denis & Schiffermuller, 1775)
- Gynnidomorpha rubricana (Peyerimhoff, 1877)
- Gypsonoma aceriana (Duponchel, 1843)
- Gypsonoma dealbana (Frolich, 1828)
- Gypsonoma imparana (Muller-Rutz, 1914)
- Gypsonoma minutana (Hübner, 1799)
- Gypsonoma nitidulana (Lienig & Zeller, 1846)
- Gypsonoma oppressana (Treitschke, 1835)
- Gypsonoma sociana (Haworth, 1811)
- Hedya dimidiana (Clerck, 1759)
- Hedya nubiferana (Haworth, 1811)
- Hedya ochroleucana (Frolich, 1828)
- Hedya pruniana (Hübner, 1799)
- Hedya salicella (Linnaeus, 1758)
- Hysterophora maculosana (Haworth, 1811)
- Isotrias hybridana (Hübner, 1817)
- Isotrias rectifasciana (Haworth, 1811)
- Isotrias stramentana (Guenee, 1845)
- Lathronympha strigana (Fabricius, 1775)
- Lepteucosma huebneriana Kocak, 1980
- Lobesia abscisana (Doubleday, 1849)
- Lobesia artemisiana (Zeller, 1847)
- Lobesia bicinctana (Duponchel, 1844)
- Lobesia botrana (Denis & Schiffermuller, 1775)
- Lobesia helichrysana (Ragonot, 1879)
- Lobesia indusiana (Zeller, 1847)
- Lobesia limoniana (Milliere, 1860)
- Lobesia littoralis (Westwood & Humphreys, 1845)
- Lobesia porrectana (Zeller, 1847)
- Lobesia quaggana Mann, 1855
- Lobesia reliquana (Hübner, 1825)
- Lobesia euphorbiana (Freyer, 1842)
- Lobesia occidentis Falkovitsh, 1970
- Lozotaenia forsterana (Fabricius, 1781)
- Lozotaenia mabilliana (Ragonot, 1875)
- Lozotaenia straminea (Schawerda, 1936)
- Lozotaeniodes brusseauxi Gibeaux, 1999
- Lozotaeniodes cupressana (Duponchel, 1836)
- Lozotaeniodes formosana (Frolich, 1830)
- Metendothenia atropunctana (Zetterstedt, 1839)
- Neosphaleroptera nubilana (Hübner, 1799)
- Notocelia cynosbatella (Linnaeus, 1758)
- Notocelia incarnatana (Hübner, 1800)
- Notocelia roborana (Denis & Schiffermuller, 1775)
- Notocelia rosaecolana (Doubleday, 1850)
- Notocelia tetragonana (Stephens, 1834)
- Notocelia trimaculana (Haworth, 1811)
- Notocelia uddmanniana (Linnaeus, 1758)
- Olethreutes arcuella (Clerck, 1759)
- Olindia schumacherana (Fabricius, 1787)
- Orthotaenia undulana (Denis & Schiffermuller, 1775)
- Oxypteron exiguana (de La Harpe, 1860)
- Oxypteron schawerdai (Rebel, 1936)
- Pammene albuginana (Guenee, 1845)
- Pammene amygdalana (Duponchel, 1842)
- Pammene argyrana (Hübner, 1799)
- Pammene aurana (Fabricius, 1775)
- Pammene aurita Razowski, 1991
- Pammene blockiana (Herrich-Schaffer, 1851)
- Pammene cocciferana Walsingham, 1903
- Pammene cytisana (Zeller, 1847)
- Pammene epanthista (Meyrick, 1922)
- Pammene fasciana (Linnaeus, 1761)
- Pammene gallicana (Guenee, 1845)
- Pammene germmana (Hübner, 1799)
- Pammene giganteana (Peyerimhoff, 1863)
- Pammene insulana (Guenee, 1845)
- Pammene juniperana (Milliere, 1858)
- Pammene luedersiana (Sorhagen, 1885)
- Pammene obscurana (Stephens, 1834)
- Pammene ochsenheimeriana (Lienig & Zeller, 1846)
- Pammene oxycedrana (Milliere, 1876)
- Pammene populana (Fabricius, 1787)
- Pammene purpureana Constant, 1888
- Pammene querceti (Gozmany, 1957)
- Pammene regiana (Zeller, 1849)
- Pammene rhediella (Clerck, 1759)
- Pammene salvana (Staudinger, 1859)
- Pammene spiniana (Duponchel, 1843)
- Pammene splendidulana (Guenee, 1845)
- Pammene suspectana (Lienig & Zeller, 1846)
- Pammene trauniana (Denis & Schiffermuller, 1775)
- Pandemis cerasana (Hübner, 1786)
- Pandemis chondrillana (Herrich-Schaffer, 1860)
- Pandemis cinnamomeana (Treitschke, 1830)
- Pandemis corylana (Fabricius, 1794)
- Pandemis dumetana (Treitschke, 1835)
- Pandemis heparana (Denis & Schiffermuller, 1775)
- Paramesia gnomana (Clerck, 1759)
- Pelatea klugiana (Freyer, 1836)
- Pelochrista agrestana (Treitschke, 1830)
- Pelochrista caecimaculana (Hübner, 1799)
- Pelochrista decolorana (Freyer, 1842)
- Pelochrista fulvostrigana (Constant, 1888)
- Pelochrista fusculana (Zeller, 1847)
- Pelochrista hepatariana (Herrich-Schaffer, 1851)
- Pelochrista infidana (Hübner, 1824)
- Pelochrista mancipiana (Mann, 1855)
- Pelochrista modicana (Zeller, 1847)
- Pelochrista mollitana (Zeller, 1847)
- Pelochrista sordicomana (Staudinger, 1859)
- Phalonidia affinitana (Douglas, 1846)
- Phalonidia albipalpana (Zeller, 1847)
- Phalonidia contractana (Zeller, 1847)
- Phalonidia curvistrigana (Stainton, 1859)
- Phalonidia gilvicomana (Zeller, 1847)
- Phalonidia manniana (Fischer v. Röslerstamm, 1839)
- Phaneta pauperana (Duponchel, 1843)
- Phiaris astrana (Guenee, 1845)
- Phiaris bipunctana (Fabricius, 1794)
- Phiaris helveticana Duponchel, 1844
- Phiaris metallicana (Hübner, 1799)
- Phiaris micana (Denis & Schiffermuller, 1775)
- Phiaris obsoletana (Zetterstedt, 1839)
- Phiaris palustrana (Lienig & Zeller, 1846)
- Phiaris schulziana (Fabricius, 1776)
- Phiaris scoriana (Guenee, 1845)
- Phiaris stibiana (Guenee, 1845)
- Phiaris turfosana (Herrich-Schaffer, 1851)
- Phiaris umbrosana (Freyer, 1842)
- Phiaris valesiana (Rebel, 1907)
- Phtheochroa cymatodana (Rebel, 1927)
- Phtheochroa duponchelana (Duponchel, 1843)
- Phtheochroa durbonana (Lhomme, 1937)
- Phtheochroa frigidana (Guenee, 1845)
- Phtheochroa fulvicinctana (Constant, 1893)
- Phtheochroa inopiana (Haworth, 1811)
- Phtheochroa purana (Guenee, 1845)
- Phtheochroa rugosana (Hübner, 1799)
- Phtheochroa schreibersiana (Frolich, 1828)
- Phtheochroa sodaliana (Haworth, 1811)
- Piniphila bifasciana (Haworth, 1811)
- Pristerognatha fuligana (Denis & Schiffermuller, 1775)
- Pristerognatha penthinana (Guenee, 1845)
- Prochlidonia amiantana (Hübner, 1799)
- Propiromorpha rhodophana (Herrich-Schaffer, 1851)
- Pseudargyrotoza conwagana (Fabricius, 1775)
- Pseudococcyx posticana (Zetterstedt, 1839)
- Pseudococcyx tessulatana (Staudinger, 1871)
- Pseudococcyx turionella (Linnaeus, 1758)
- Pseudohermenias abietana (Fabricius, 1787)
- Pseudosciaphila branderiana (Linnaeus, 1758)
- Ptycholoma lecheana (Linnaeus, 1758)
- Retinia perangustana (Snellen, 1883)
- Retinia resinella (Linnaeus, 1758)
- Rhopobota myrtillana (Humphreys & Westwood, 1845)
- Rhopobota naevana (Hübner, 1817)
- Rhopobota stagnana (Denis & Schiffermuller, 1775)
- Rhopobota ustomaculana (Curtis, 1831)
- Rhyacionia buoliana (Denis & Schiffermuller, 1775)
- Rhyacionia duplana (Hübner, 1813)
- Rhyacionia maritimana Prose, 1981
- Rhyacionia miniatana (Staudinger, 1871)
- Rhyacionia pinicolana (Doubleday, 1849)
- Rhyacionia pinivorana (Lienig & Zeller, 1846)
- Rolandylis maiana (Kearfott, 1907)
- Selania leplastriana (Curtis, 1831)
- Selania resedana (Obraztsov, 1959)
- Selenodes karelica (Tengstrom, 1875)
- Sparganothis pilleriana (Denis & Schiffermuller, 1775)
- Spatalistis bifasciana (Hübner, 1787)
- Spilonota laricana (Heinemann, 1863)
- Spilonota ocellana (Denis & Schiffermuller, 1775)
- Stictea mygindiana (Denis & Schiffermuller, 1775)
- Strophedra nitidana (Fabricius, 1794)
- Strophedra weirana (Douglas, 1850)
- Syndemis musculana (Hübner, 1799)
- Thiodia citrana (Hübner, 1799)
- Thiodia couleruana (Duponchel, 1834)
- Thiodia lerneana (Treitschke, 1835)
- Thiodia major (Rebel, 1903)
- Thiodia torridana (Lederer, 1859)
- Thiodia trochilana (Frolich, 1828)
- Thiodiodes seeboldi (Rossler, 1877)
- Tortricodes alternella (Denis & Schiffermuller, 1775)
- Tortrix viridana Linnaeus, 1758
- Tosirips magyarus Razowski, 1987
- Xerocnephasia rigana (Sodoffsky, 1829)
- Zeiraphera griseana (Hübner, 1799)
- Zeiraphera isertana (Fabricius, 1794)
- Zeiraphera ratzeburgiana (Saxesen, 1840)
- Zeiraphera rufimitrana (Herrich-Schaffer, 1851)

== Family Urodidae ==
- Wockia asperipunctella (Bruand, 1851)

== Family Yponomeutidae ==
- Cedestis gysseleniella Zeller, 1839
- Cedestis subfasciella (Stephens, 1834)
- Euhyponomeuta stannella (Thunberg, 1788)
- Euhyponomeutoides albithoracellus Gaj, 1954
- Euhyponomeutoides ribesiella (de Joannis, 1900)
- Kessleria albescens (Rebel, 1899)
- Kessleria albomaculata Huemer & Tarmann, 1992
- Kessleria alpmaritimae Huemer & Mutanen, 2015
- Kessleria alternans (Staudinger, 1871)
- Kessleria brachypterella Huemer & Tarmann, 1992
- Kessleria cottiensis Huemer & Mutanen, 2015
- Kessleria dimorpha Huemer & Mutanen, 2015
- Kessleria inexpectata Huemer & Tarmann, 1992
- Kessleria pyrenaea Friese, 1960
- Kessleria saxifragae (Stainton, 1868)
- Kessleria wehrlii Huemer & Tarmann, 1992
- Niphonympha dealbatella (Zeller, 1847)
- Ocnerostoma friesei Svensson, 1966
- Ocnerostoma piniariella Zeller, 1847
- Paradoxus osyridellus Stainton, 1869
- Parahyponomeuta egregiella (Duponchel, 1839)
- Paraswammerdamia albicapitella (Scharfenberg, 1805)
- Paraswammerdamia conspersella (Tengstrom, 1848)
- Paraswammerdamia nebulella (Goeze, 1783)
- Pseudoswammerdamia combinella (Hübner, 1786)
- Scythropia crataegella (Linnaeus, 1767)
- Swammerdamia caesiella (Hübner, 1796)
- Swammerdamia compunctella Herrich-Schaffer, 1855
- Swammerdamia pyrella (Villers, 1789)
- Yponomeuta cagnagella (Hübner, 1813)
- Yponomeuta evonymella (Linnaeus, 1758)
- Yponomeuta irrorella (Hübner, 1796)
- Yponomeuta mahalebella Guenee, 1845
- Yponomeuta malinellus Zeller, 1838
- Yponomeuta padella (Linnaeus, 1758)
- Yponomeuta plumbella (Denis & Schiffermuller, 1775)
- Yponomeuta rorrella (Hübner, 1796)
- Yponomeuta sedella Treitschke, 1832
- Zelleria abisella (Chretien, 1910)
- Zelleria hepariella Stainton, 1849
- Zelleria oleastrella (Milliere, 1864)

== Family Ypsolophidae ==
- Ochsenheimeria bubalella (Hübner, 1813)
- Ochsenheimeria glabratella Muller-Rutz, 1914
- Ochsenheimeria taurella (Denis & Schiffermuller, 1775)
- Ochsenheimeria urella Fischer von Röslerstamm, 1842
- Ochsenheimeria vacculella Fischer von Röslerstamm, 1842
- Phrealcia eximiella (Rebel, 1899)
- Ypsolopha alpella (Denis & Schiffermuller, 1775)
- Ypsolopha asperella (Linnaeus, 1761)
- Ypsolopha chazariella (Mann, 1866)
- Ypsolopha dentella (Fabricius, 1775)
- Ypsolopha divisella (Chretien, 1915)
- Ypsolopha falcella (Denis & Schiffermuller, 1775)
- Ypsolopha horridella (Treitschke, 1835)
- Ypsolopha indecorella (Rebel, 1903)
- Ypsolopha instabilella (Mann, 1866)
- Ypsolopha lucella (Fabricius, 1775)
- Ypsolopha mucronella (Scopoli, 1763)
- Ypsolopha nemorella (Linnaeus, 1758)
- Ypsolopha parenthesella (Linnaeus, 1761)
- Ypsolopha persicella (Fabricius, 1787)
- Ypsolopha scabrella (Linnaeus, 1761)
- Ypsolopha sequella (Clerck, 1759)
- Ypsolopha sylvella (Linnaeus, 1767)
- Ypsolopha ustella (Clerck, 1759)
- Ypsolopha vittella (Linnaeus, 1758)

== Family Zygaenidae ==
- Adscita albanica (Naufock, 1926)
- Adscita alpina (Alberti, 1937)
- Adscita geryon (Hübner, 1813)
- Adscita statices (Linnaeus, 1758)
- Adscita mannii (Lederer, 1853)
- Aglaope infausta (Linnaeus, 1767)
- Jordanita hispanica (Alberti, 1937)
- Jordanita chloros (Hübner, 1813)
- Jordanita globulariae (Hübner, 1793)
- Jordanita subsolana (Staudinger, 1862)
- Jordanita budensis (Ad. & Au. Speyer, 1858)
- Jordanita notata (Zeller, 1847)
- Rhagades pruni (Denis & Schiffermuller, 1775)
- Theresimima ampellophaga (Bayle-Barelle, 1808)
- Zygaena carniolica (Scopoli, 1763)
- Zygaena fausta (Linnaeus, 1767)
- Zygaena hilaris Ochsenheimer, 1808
- Zygaena occitanica (Villers, 1789)
- Zygaena brizae (Esper, 1800)
- Zygaena contaminei Boisduval, 1834
- Zygaena corsica Boisduval, 1828
- Zygaena cynarae (Esper, 1789)
- Zygaena erythrus (Hübner, 1806)
- Zygaena minos (Denis & Schiffermuller, 1775)
- Zygaena purpuralis (Brunnich, 1763)
- Zygaena sarpedon (Hübner, 1790)
- Zygaena anthyllidis Boisduval, 1828
- Zygaena ephialtes (Linnaeus, 1767)
- Zygaena exulans (Hohenwarth, 1792)
- Zygaena filipendulae (Linnaeus, 1758)
- Zygaena lavandulae (Esper, 1783)
- Zygaena lonicerae (Scheven, 1777)
- Zygaena loti (Denis & Schiffermuller, 1775)
- Zygaena nevadensis Rambur, 1858
- Zygaena osterodensis Reiss, 1921
- Zygaena rhadamanthus (Esper, 1789)
- Zygaena romeo Duponchel, 1835
- Zygaena transalpina (Esper, 1780)
- Zygaena trifolii (Esper, 1783)
- Zygaena viciae (Denis & Schiffermuller, 1775)
