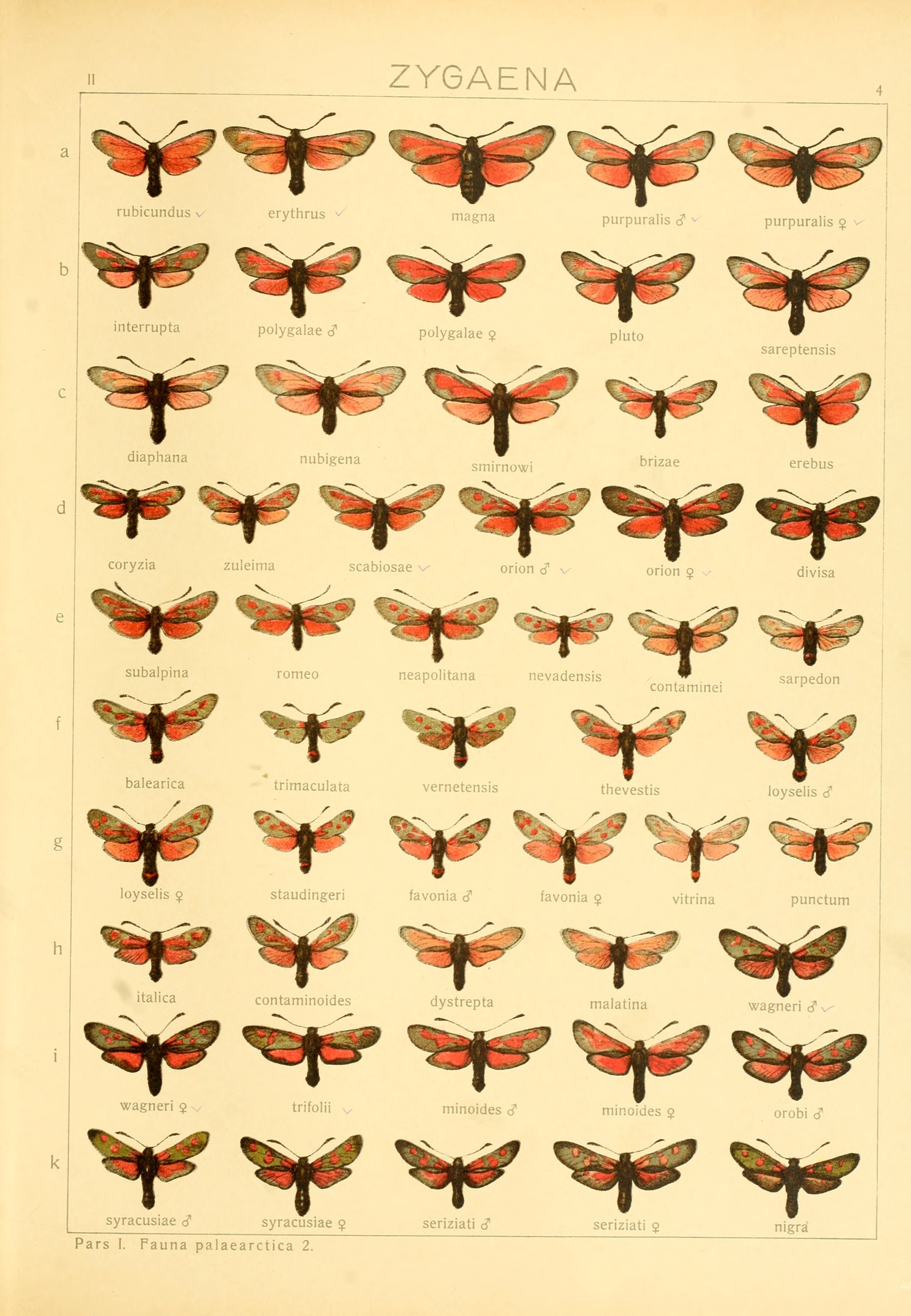
- Zygaena contaminei 4e

Scientific classification
- Domain: Eukaryota
- Kingdom: Animalia
- Phylum: Arthropoda
- Class: Insecta
- Order: Lepidoptera
- Family: Zygaenidae
- Genus: Zygaena
- Species: Z. contaminei

Binomial name
- Zygaena contaminei Boisduval, 1834

Synonyms
- Zygaena pennina Rambur, 1866; Zygaena penalabrica Fernández, 1929; Zygaena peñalabrica Fernández, 1929; Zygaena asturica Reis, 1936

= Zygaena contaminei =

Species of moth

Zygaena contaminei is a species of moth in the Zygaenidae family. It is found in France and Spain.

== Technical description and variation (Seitz) ==
This species, which is distributed from the Pyrenees to Andalusia, being more restricted to mountainous districts, corresponds in pattern to scabiosae orion, i. e. the anterior streak is rather short, the central one is separated into a minute basal dot and a large drop-like spot, and the posterior one, though continuous, is strongly constricted in the middle. The very gradually and evenly incrassate, but very strongly clubbed antenna distinguishes this species at once from all forms of scabiosae, with the exception of the small nevadensis, which is, however, much larger, being almost twice the size.

The larvae feed on Eryngium bourgatii. Adults are on wing from the beginning of July to mid August. The species overwinters in the larval stage. Full-grown larvae can be found from the end of May to mid or end June.

== Subspecies ==
- Zygaena contaminei contaminei
- Zygaena contaminei almanzorica Reiss, 1936
- Zygaena contaminei penalabrica Fernandez, 1929
