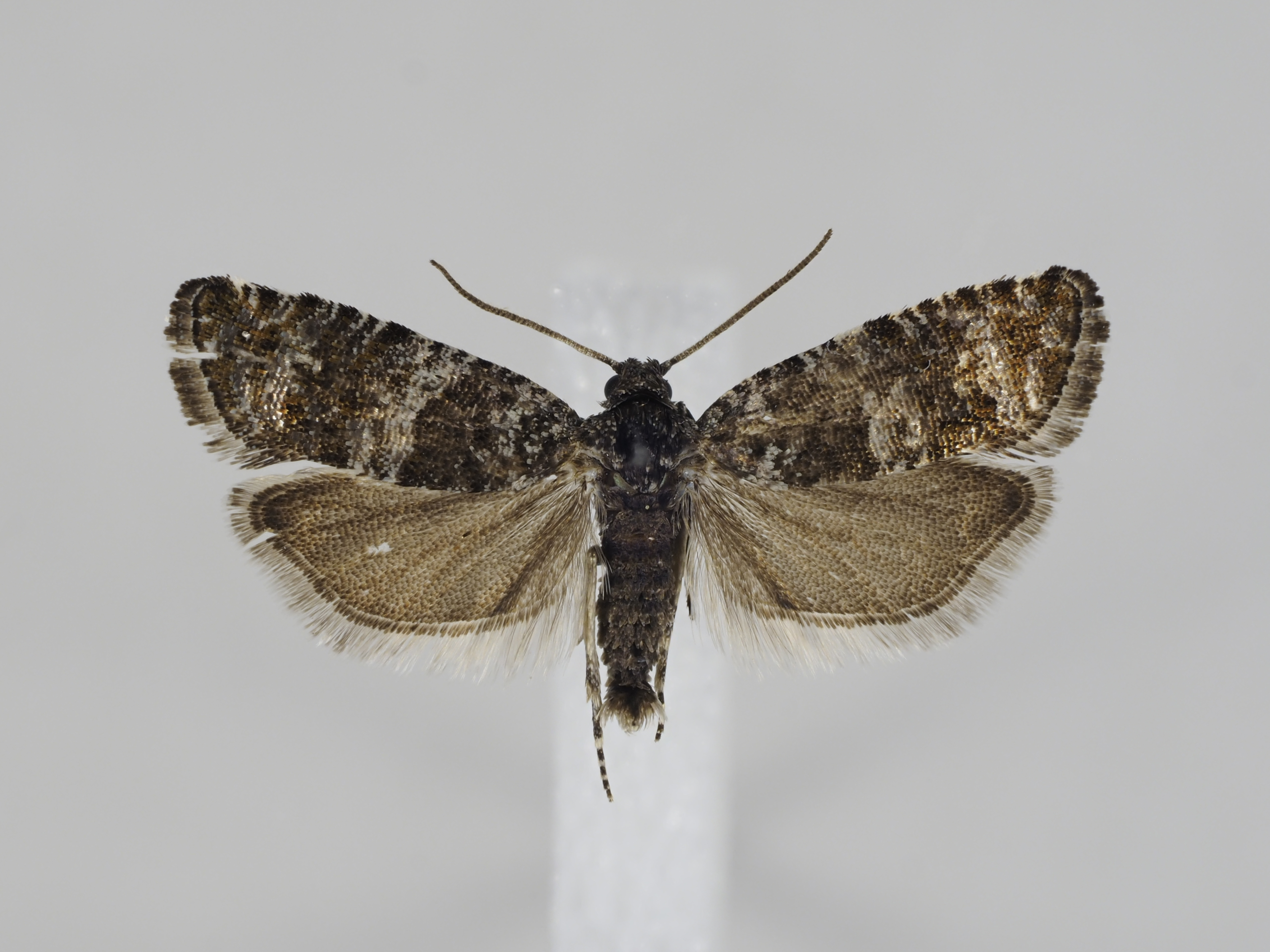

Scientific classification
- Kingdom: Animalia
- Phylum: Arthropoda
- Class: Insecta
- Order: Lepidoptera
- Family: Tortricidae
- Genus: Retinia
- Species: R. perangustana

Binomial name
- Retinia perangustana (Snellen, 1883)

= Retinia perangustana =

Species of moth

Retinia perangustana is a species of moth belonging to the family Tortricidae.

It is native to Northern and Central Europe.
