= Scythris bornicensis =

Scientific classification
- Kingdom: Animalia
- Phylum: Arthropoda
- Class: Insecta
- Order: Lepidoptera
- Family: Scythrididae
- Genus: Scythris
- Species: S. bornicensis

Binomial name
- Scythris bornicensis Jäckh, 1977

Synonyms
- Butalis grandipennis var. jurassiella Bruand, 1858; Scythris jurassiella

Species of moth

Scythris bornicensis is a moth of the family Scythrididae. It was described by Jäckh in 1977. It is found in France, Germany, Spain and Switzerland.

The wingspan is about 15 mm. The fore- and hindwings have a clear chocolate brown, bronzy ground colour. There is no patterns on the wings.
