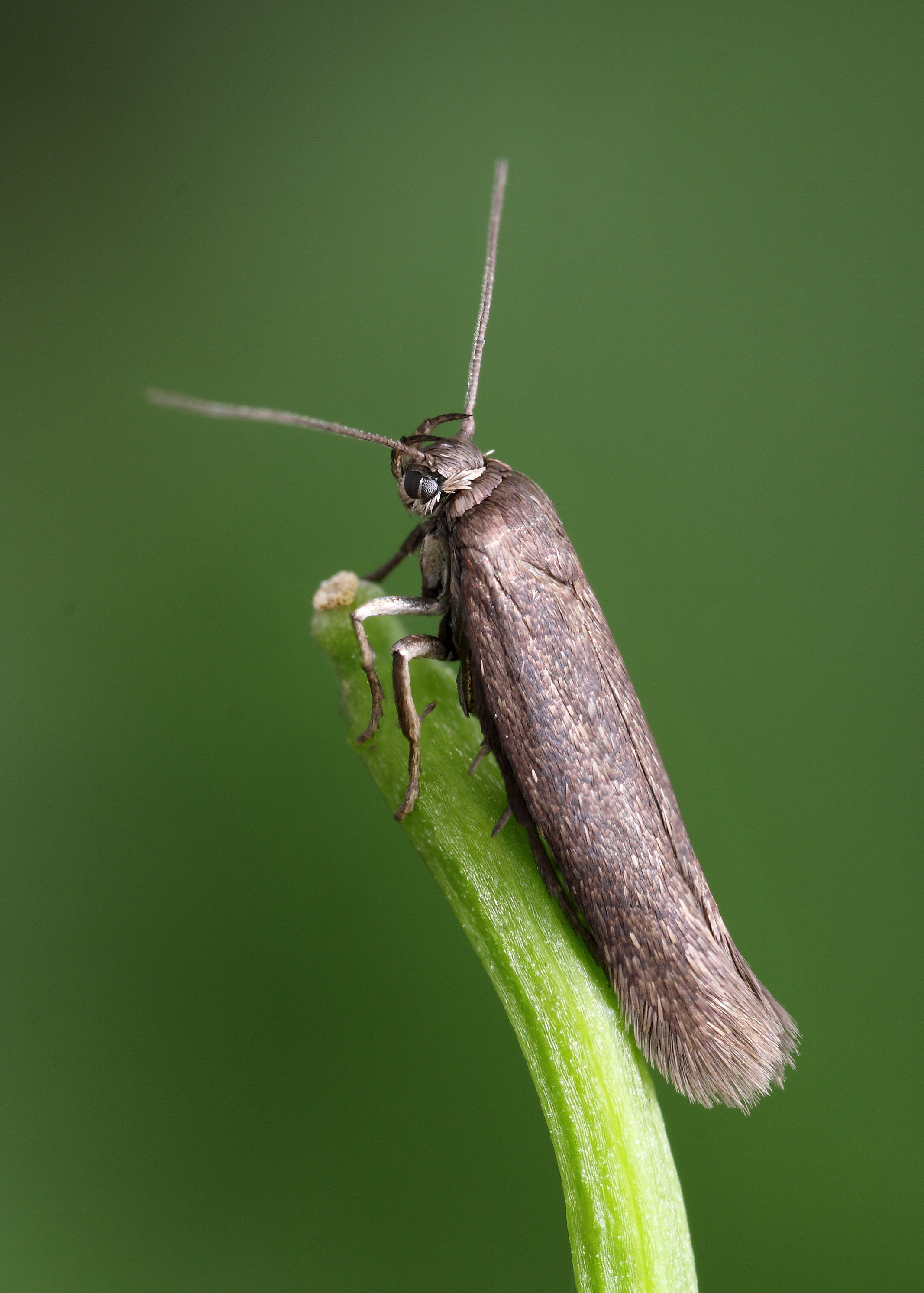

Scientific classification
- Kingdom: Animalia
- Phylum: Arthropoda
- Class: Insecta
- Order: Lepidoptera
- Family: Scythrididae
- Genus: Scythris
- Species: S. picaepennis

Binomial name
- Scythris picaepennis (Haworth, 1828)

Synonyms
- Porrectaria picaepennis Haworth, 1828

= Scythris picaepennis =

Species of moth

Scythris picaepennis is a moth of the family Scythrididae first described by Adrian Hardy Haworth in 1828. It is found in Europe.

== Description ==
The moth has a wingspan of circa 10 mm. Abdomen in female beneath with ochreous-whitish blotch extending over two or more anteapical segments. Forewings moderately long-pointed, dark bronzy-fuscous, with scattered whitish hair-scales, especially towards apex. Hindwings, dark purplish-fuscous. Larva dull grey-green, with several whitish lines; dots blackish; head brown-black.

It is on the wing in July.

The larvae feed in a web on many herbs including common rock-rose (Helianthemum nummularium), common bird's-foot trefoil (Lotus corniculatus), plantains (Plantago species), devil's-bit scabious (Succisa pratensis); thyme (Thymus praecox subsp praecox) and wild thyme (Thymus polytrichus).
