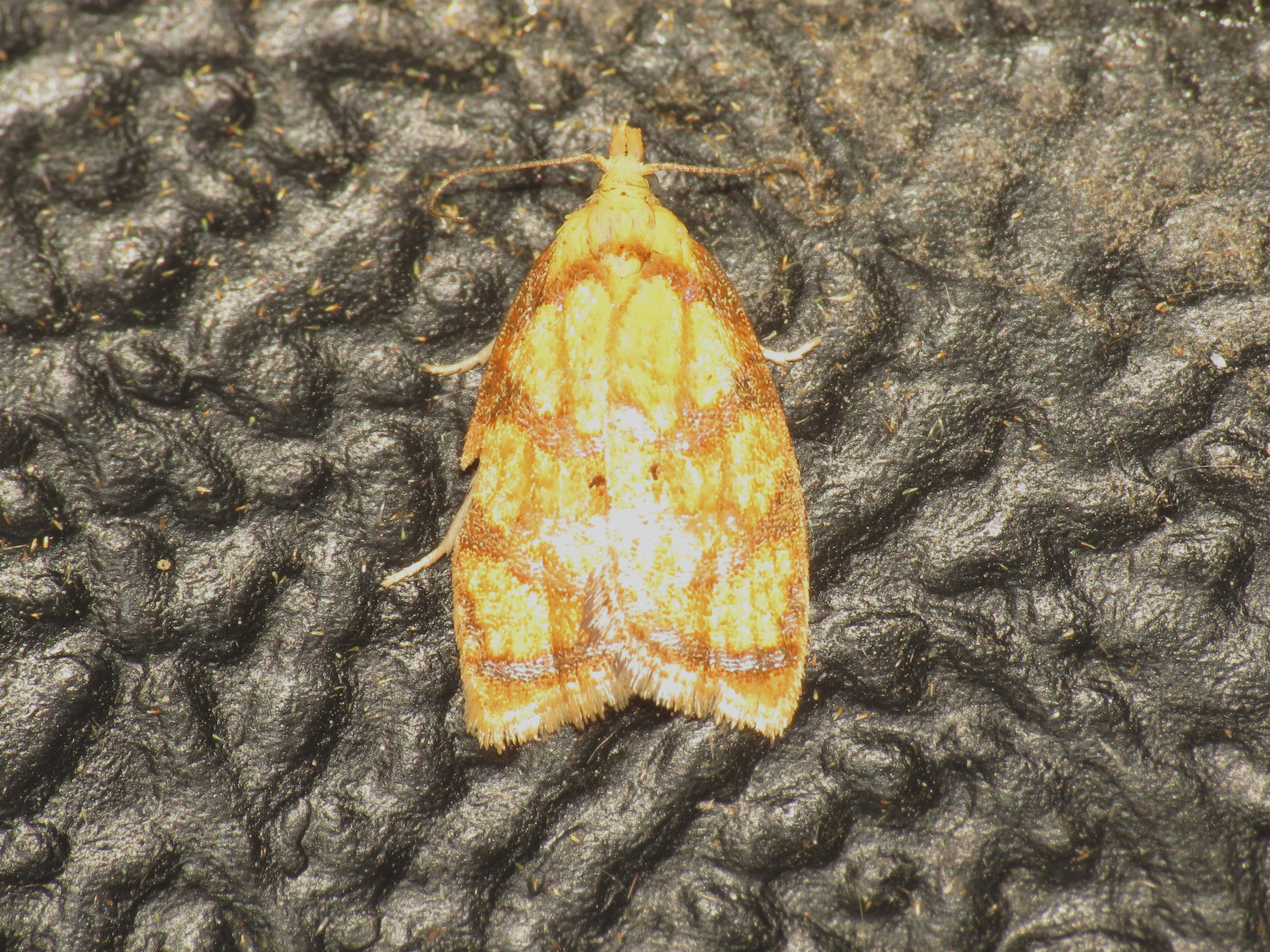

Scientific classification
- Kingdom: Animalia
- Phylum: Arthropoda
- Class: Insecta
- Order: Lepidoptera
- Family: Tortricidae
- Genus: Acleris
- Species: A. bergmanniana

Binomial name
- Acleris bergmanniana (Linnaeus, 1758)

Synonyms
- Phalaena (Tortrix) bergmanniana Linnaeus, 1758; Argyrotoxa bergmanniana f. luteana Sheldon, 1934; Tortrix rosana Hubner, [1796-1799]

= Acleris bergmanniana =

Yellow rose button moth

Species of moth

Acleris bergmanniana, the yellow rose button moth, is a moth of the family Tortricidae. It is found from most of Europe to the eastern Palearctic realm.

The wingspan is 12–15 mm. The forewings which have a yellow ground colour are marked with three metallic blue-grey narrow transverse bands, edged with rufous.The forewing has pronounced, acute-angled wing tips.In the middle of the wing there is a round small black spot that is a tuft of erect, dark scales.There are also two small raised tufts of black scales.

Adults are on wing from June to July.

The larvae feed on the leaves and shoots of rose Rosa species (Rosa canina), as well as Rhamnus cathartica.
