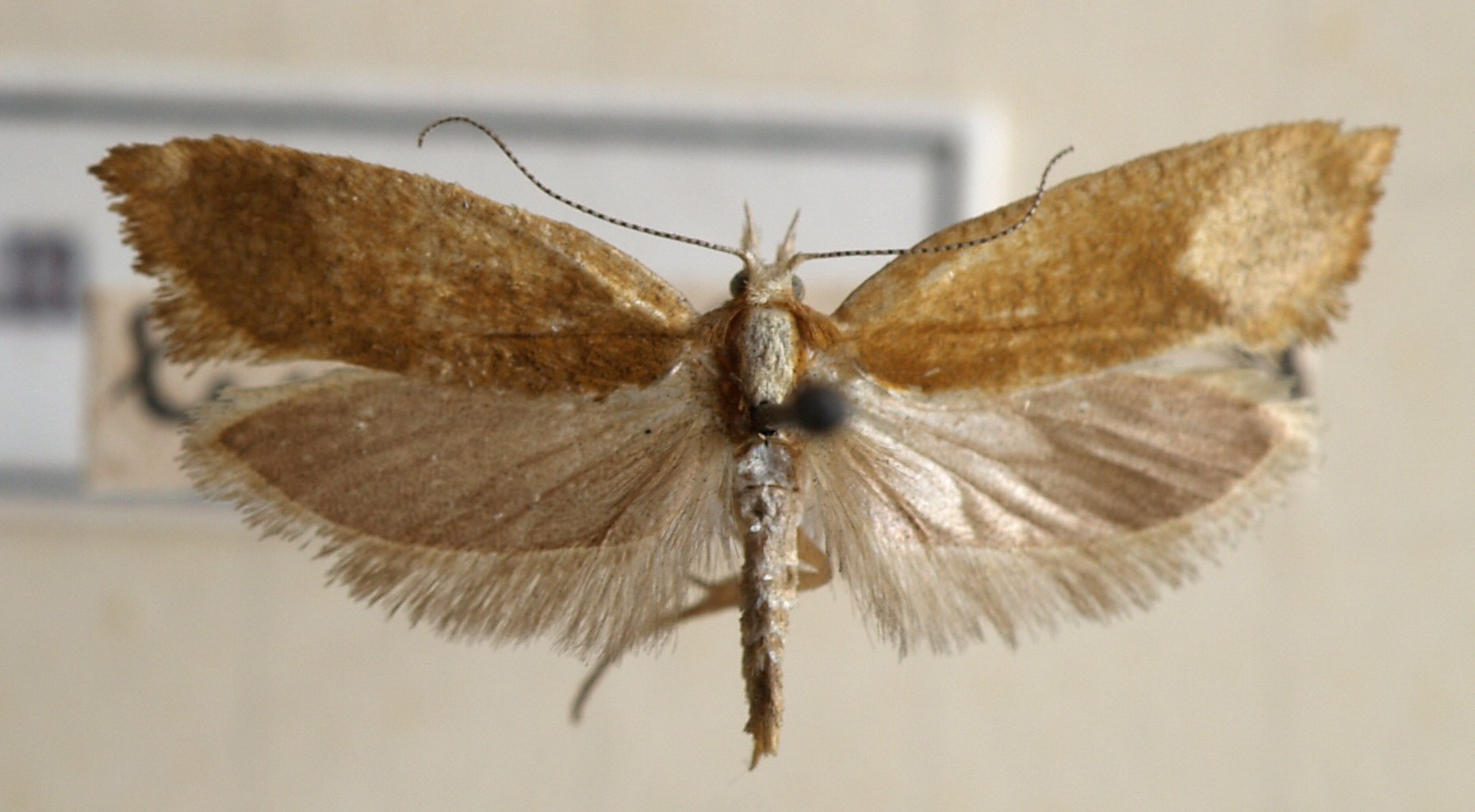

Scientific classification
- Domain: Eukaryota
- Kingdom: Animalia
- Phylum: Arthropoda
- Class: Insecta
- Order: Lepidoptera
- Family: Ypsolophidae
- Genus: Ypsolopha
- Species: Y. lucella

Binomial name
- Ypsolopha lucella Fabricius, 1775

= Ypsolopha lucella =

Species of moth

Ypsolopha lucella is a moth of the family Ypsolophidae. It is found in Europe and Near East.

The moth flies from June to September depending on the location.

The larvae feed on oaks.
