= Scythris binotiferella =

Scientific classification
- Kingdom: Animalia
- Phylum: Arthropoda
- Clade: Pancrustacea
- Class: Insecta
- Order: Lepidoptera
- Family: Scythrididae
- Genus: Scythris
- Species: S. binotiferella

Binomial name
- Scythris binotiferella (Ragonot, 1881)

Synonyms
- Butalis binotiferella Ragonot, 1881; Scythris eusemiella Le Marchand, 1944; Scythris jorgejuani Agenjo, 1969

Species of moth

Scythris binotiferella is a moth of the family Scythrididae. It was described by Émile Louis Ragonot in 1881. It is found in France and Spain.
