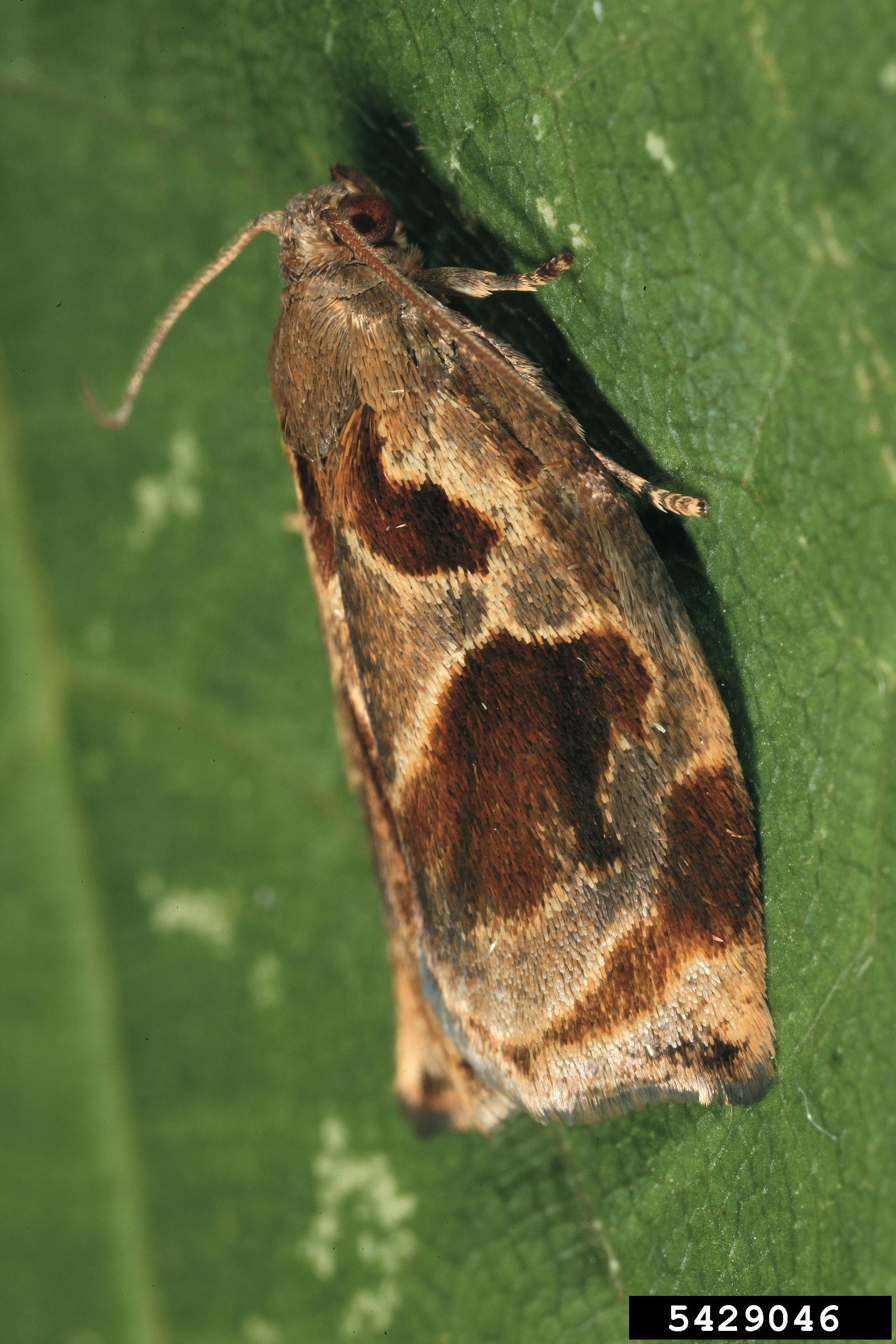

Scientific classification
- Kingdom: Animalia
- Phylum: Arthropoda
- Clade: Pancrustacea
- Class: Insecta
- Order: Lepidoptera
- Family: Tortricidae
- Genus: Archips
- Species: A. crataegana

Binomial name
- Archips crataegana (Hubner, [1796-1799])

Synonyms
- Tortrix crataegana Hubner, [1796-1799]; Archips crataegana ab. confluens Obraztsov, 1955; Archips endoi Yasuda, 1975; Tortrix roborana Hubner, [1796-1799]; Cacoecia crataegana var. rubromaculata Schawerda, 1933

= Archips crataegana =

Brown oak tortrix

Species of moth

Archips crataegana, the brown oak tortrix, is a moth of the family Tortricidae. It is found in most of Europe east to Japan.

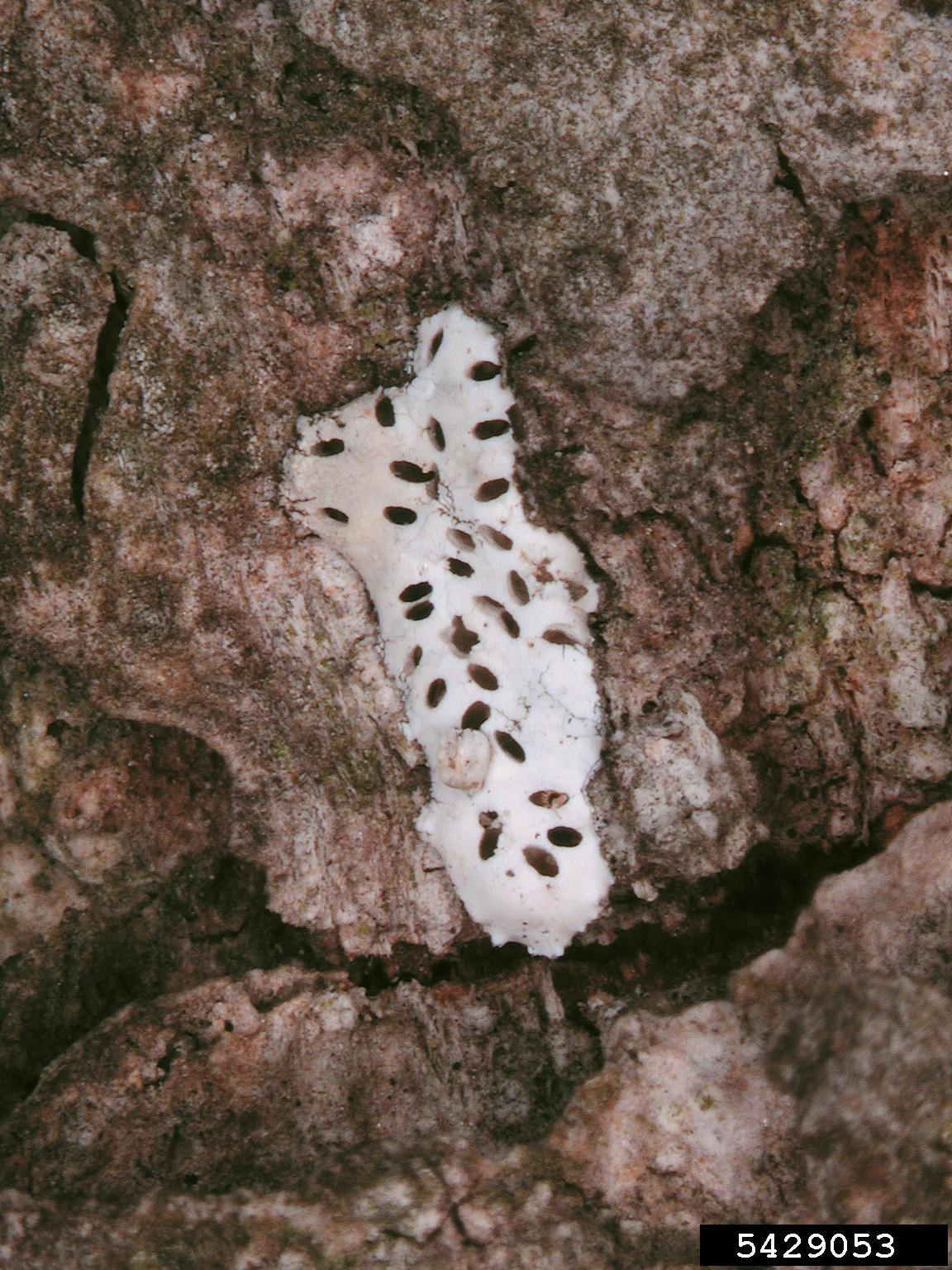
Eggs

The wingspan is about 20 mm for males and about 25 mm for females. Adults are sexually dimorphic. The forewings have a sinuate termen There is an irregular vertical, costal fold from the base to 2/3 and light brown or ochreous-brown There is a transverse dorsal spot near the base. The central fascia has the anterior edge angulated below middle. The costal patch is extended as a streak to the termen above the tornus. It is dark ochreous-brown. The fascia is attenuated and sometimes obsolete towards costa. The hindwings are grey, the apex in female sometimes yellowish. Julius von Kennel provides a full description.

They are on wing from June to August.

The larvae feed on various deciduous trees, including Quercus, Ulmus, Fraxinus and Salix species. They feed in a tightly-rolled leaf. The species overwinters as an egg.

== Subspecies ==
- Archips crataeganus crataeganus
- Archips crataeganus endoi Yasuda, 1975 (South Korea, Japan, China: Heilongjiang, Jilin, Shaanxi, Sichuan)
