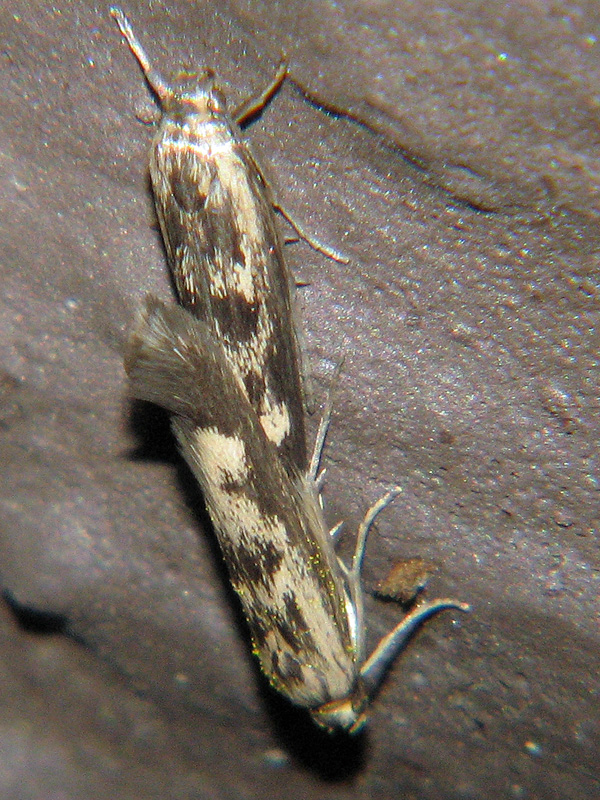

Scientific classification
- Kingdom: Animalia
- Phylum: Arthropoda
- Class: Insecta
- Order: Lepidoptera
- Family: Scythrididae
- Genus: Scythris
- Species: S. limbella

Binomial name
- Scythris limbella (Fabricius, 1775)

Synonyms
- List: Tinea limbella Fabricius, 1775; Tinea variella Denis & Schiffermüller, 1775; Tinea quadriguttella Thunberg, 1794; Tinea tristella Hübner, [1796]; Astyages cylindrella Stephens, 1834; Röslerstammia quadrigutella Bruand, 1850; Butalis chenopodiella f. obscura Staudinger, 1871

= Scythris limbella =

Species of moth

Scythris limbella is a moth of the family Scythrididae first described by the Danish zoologist Johan Christian Fabricius. It is found in Asia and Europe.

== Description ==
The wingspan is about 15 mm. Adults are on wing from June to September, possibly in two generations. The larvae feed on the shoots and flowers of goosefoots (Chenopodium species) and orache (Atriplex species) in a web.

== Distribution ==
It is found in most of Europe (except Iceland, Ireland, and part of the Balkan Peninsula and Ukraine), east into Russia and Iran (from Golestan to Farsi). It is an introduced species in the north-eastern Nearctic region.
