= Scythris mariannae =

Scientific classification
- Kingdom: Animalia
- Phylum: Arthropoda
- Clade: Pancrustacea
- Class: Insecta
- Order: Lepidoptera
- Family: Scythrididae
- Genus: Scythris
- Species: S. mariannae

Binomial name
- Scythris mariannae Bengtsson, 1997

Synonyms
- Scyhtris mariannae Bengtsson, 1997; Scythris marianni Bengtsson, 1991; Scythris annae Bengtsson, 1997

Species of moth

Scythris mariannae is a moth of the family Scythrididae. It was described by Bengt Å. Bengtsson in 1997. It is found in Spain and France.

== Etymology ==
The species name is dedicated to the wife of the author, Mari-Ann.
