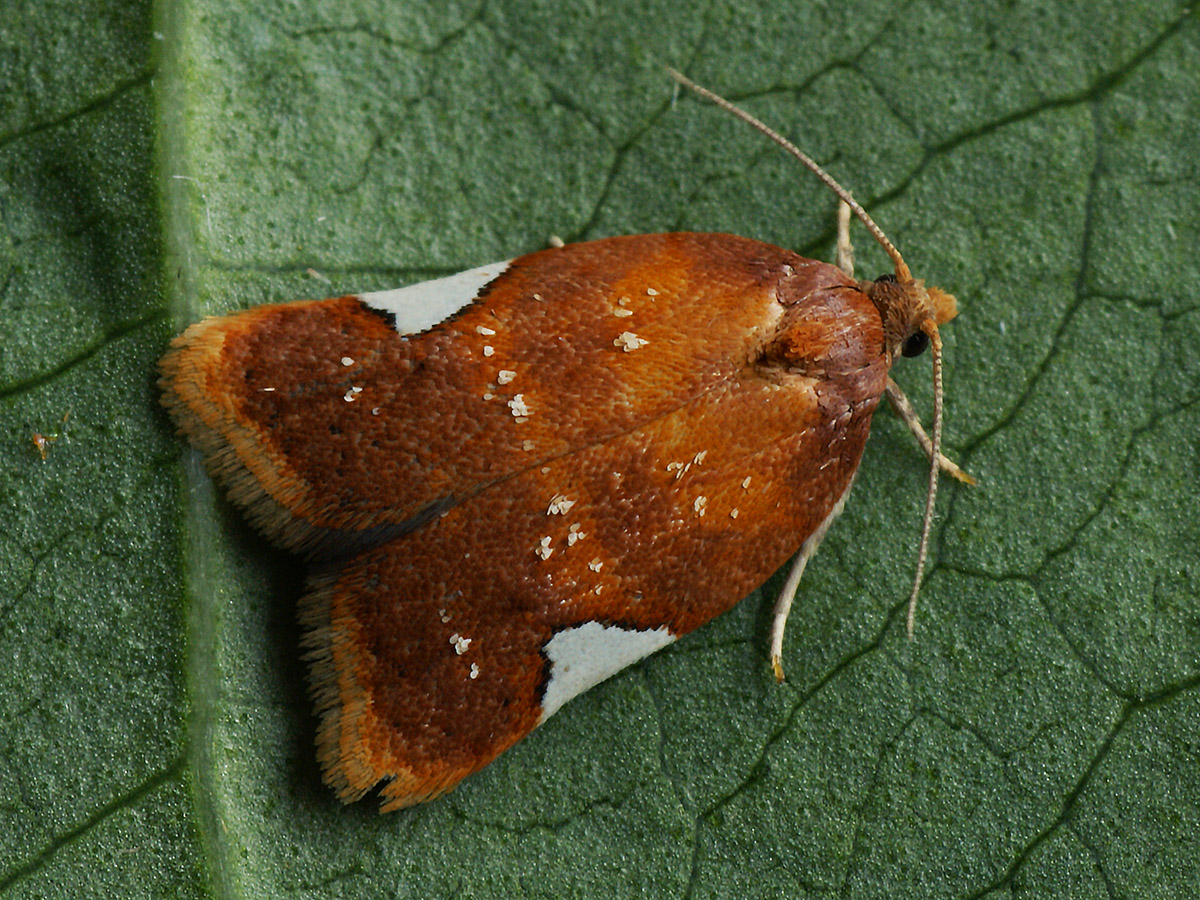
- Acleris holmiana Moscow Oblast

Scientific classification
- Kingdom: Animalia
- Phylum: Arthropoda
- Class: Insecta
- Order: Lepidoptera
- Family: Tortricidae
- Genus: Acleris
- Species: A. holmiana

Binomial name
- Acleris holmiana (Linnaeus, 1758)

Synonyms
- Phalaena (Tortrix) holmiana Linnaeus, 1758

= Acleris holmiana =

Golden leafroller moth

Species of moth

Acleris holmiana, the golden leafroller moth, is a moth of the family Tortricidae. It is found in most of Europe and Asia Minor.

The wingspan is about 10–15 mm. The forewings are suboblong, deep orange -ferruginous, yellower towards dorsum anteriorly, suffusedly streaked transversely with pale violet, sometimes mixed posteriorly with whitish and blackish scales. Tufts are absent and there is a triangular white often black-edged costal blotch beyond middle. The cilia are ochreous-yellowish, on tornus dark grey. The hindwings are grey, darker posteriorly. The larva is yellowish with a pale brown head. Julius von Kennel provides a full description.

Adults are on wing from July to August. There is one generation per year.

The larvae feed on a various rosaceous trees and shrubs including Crataegus, Rubus, Pyrus, Prunus, Cydonia, Rosa and Malus.
