= Scythris anomaloptera =

Scientific classification
- Kingdom: Animalia
- Phylum: Arthropoda
- Class: Insecta
- Order: Lepidoptera
- Family: Scythrididae
- Genus: Scythris
- Species: S. anomaloptera

Binomial name
- Scythris anomaloptera (Staudinger, 1880)

Synonyms
- Butalis anomaloptera Staudinger, 1880; Scythris ulloai Agenjo, 1969

Species of moth

Scythris anomaloptera is a moth of the family Scythrididae. It was described by Otto Staudinger in 1880. It is found in France, Spain, Bulgaria, Greece, southern European Russia and Turkey.
