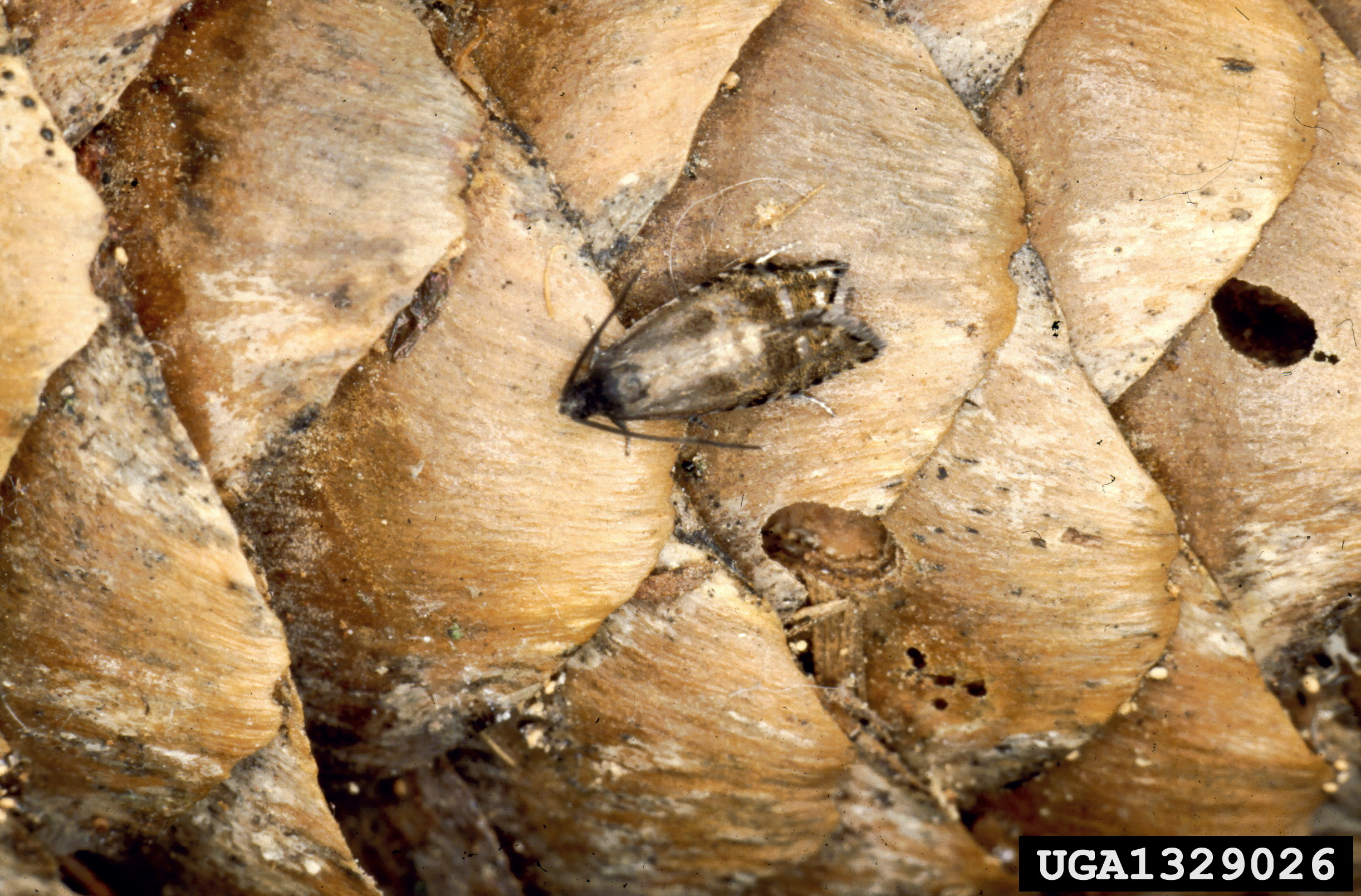

Scientific classification
- Kingdom: Animalia
- Phylum: Arthropoda
- Class: Insecta
- Order: Lepidoptera
- Family: Tortricidae
- Genus: Cydia
- Species: C. strobilella

Binomial name
- Cydia strobilella (Linnaeus, 1758)

Synonyms
- Phalaena (Tortrix) strobilella Linnaeus, 1758; Tortrix kollarana Frolich, 1828; Tortrix strobilana Hubner, [1796-1799]; Enarmonia youngana Kearfott, 1907

= Cydia strobilella =

Spruce seed moth

Species of moth

Cydia strobilella, the spruce seed moth, is a moth of the family Tortricidae. It is found in Europe.

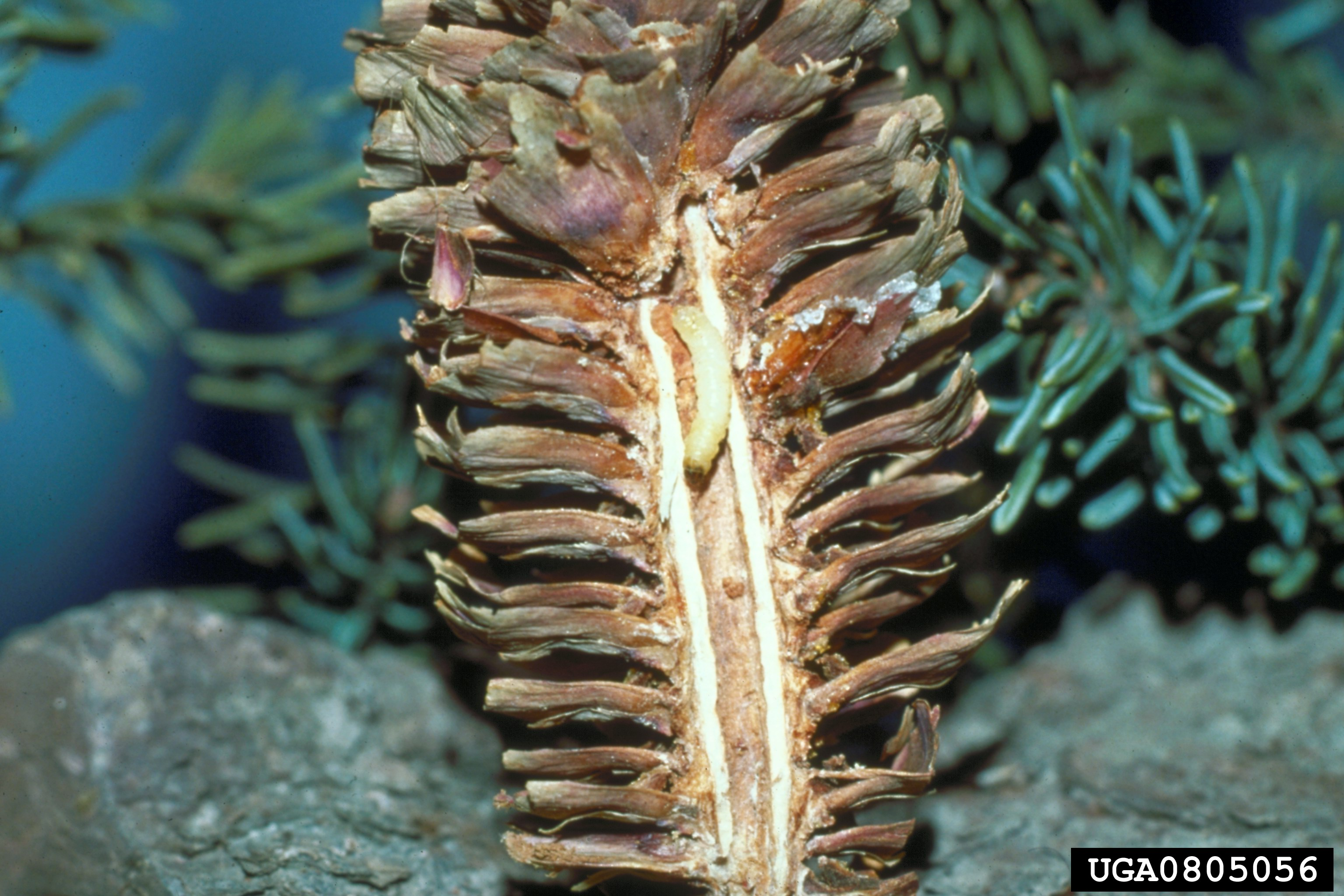
Caterpillar

The wingspan is 10–15 mm. The moth flies from April to June depending on the location.

The larvae feed on Abies alba, Picea omorika, Picea abies en Pinus sylvestris.

A “major pest of spruce” (Hedlin et al. 1980), the spruce seed moth Laspeyresia youngana Kearfott, or Cydia strobilella Linnaeus (Ives and Wong 1988, Syme and Nystrom 1988), is widespread across Canada and the northern United States. Severe damage to white spruce cones has occurred in central and western Canada (Rose and Lindquist 1985), but the seed moth is of only moderate importance in Ontario (Syme and Nystrom 1988).

The spruce seed moth Cydia youngana Kearfott is found across Canada and the northern United States feeding in the cones of various spruces. Severe damage to white spruce has been reported from central and western Canada (Rose and Lindquist 1985). In Ontario the moths fly in May, about the time that spruce pollen is shed, and lay a single egg per cone if cones are plentiful. On hatching, the larva initially tunnels in the cone scales and then moves deeper to feed on the developing seeds. In late June, the larva makes a narrow tunnel down the axis of the cone from which it feeds. When full grown in the fall it is about 10 mm long. It hibernates in the central tunnel in the cone and pupates in the spring, the adult moths emerging from the pupal cases in about 18 days. Some of the larvae do not change to pupa in the first spring but remain dormant for 1 or more years. It seems that the number of adults present in any year correlates with the number of cones developed.
