= Scythris corsa =

Scientific classification
- Kingdom: Animalia
- Phylum: Arthropoda
- Class: Insecta
- Order: Lepidoptera
- Family: Scythrididae
- Genus: Scythris
- Species: S. corsa

Binomial name
- Scythris corsa Passerin d'Entrèves, 1986

Species of moth

Scythris corsa is a moth of the family Scythrididae. It was described by Pietro Passerin d'Entrèves in 1986. It is found on Corsica.

The wingspan is 13–15 mm.

The larvae feed on Anthyllis hermanni.
