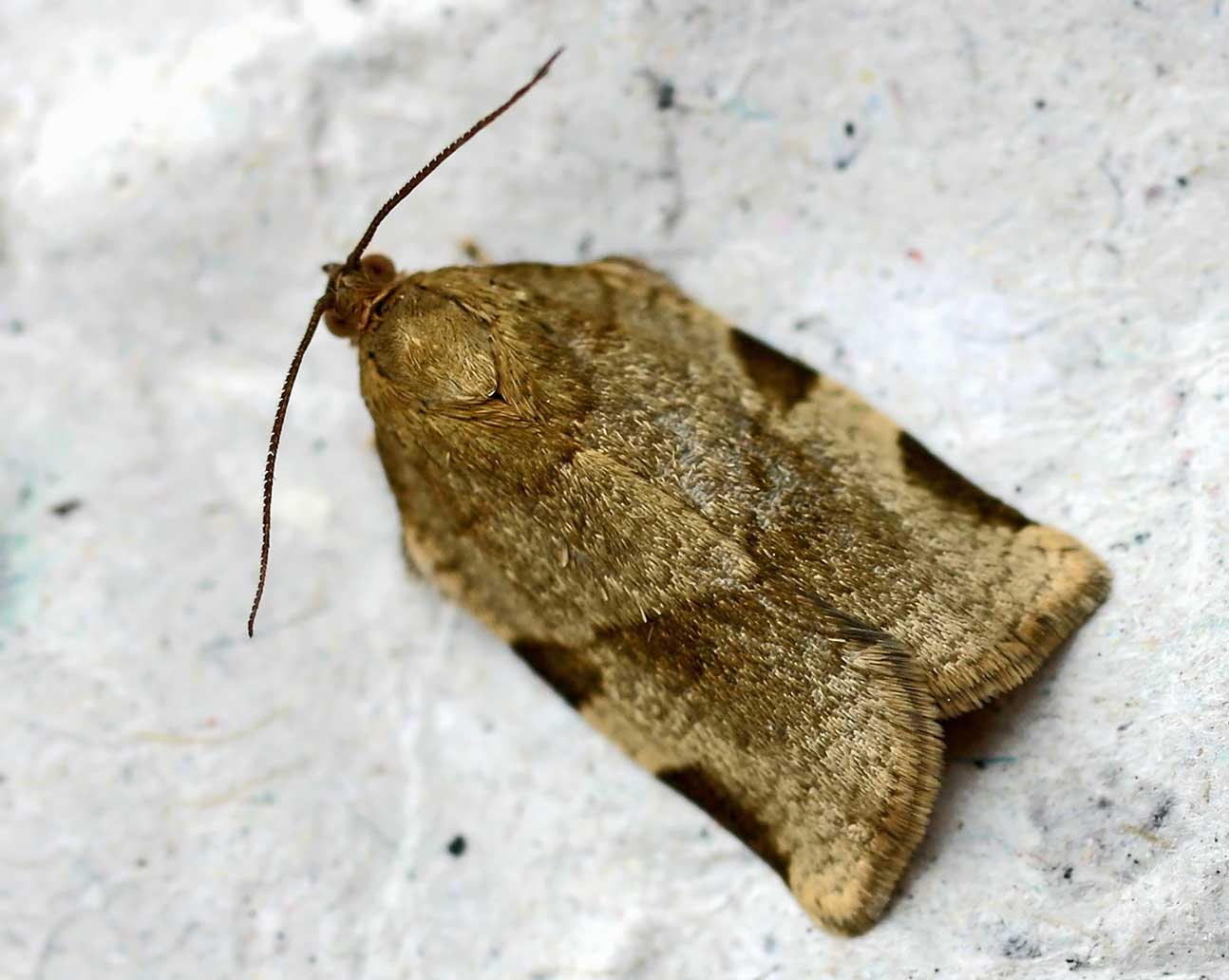

Scientific classification
- Domain: Eukaryota
- Kingdom: Animalia
- Phylum: Arthropoda
- Class: Insecta
- Order: Lepidoptera
- Family: Tortricidae
- Genus: Choristoneura
- Species: C. hebenstreitella

Binomial name
- Choristoneura hebenstreitella (Müller, 1764)

Synonyms
- Phalaena Tinea hebenstreitella Müller, 1764; Phalaena Tortrix pyrana Villers, 1789; Tortrix sorbiana Hübner, [1796-1799]

= Choristoneura hebenstreitella =

Mountain-ash tortricid

Species of moth

Choristoneura hebenstreitella, the mountain-ash tortricid, is a moth of the family Tortricidae. It is found in Western Europe, Central Europe, the Near East and Iran.

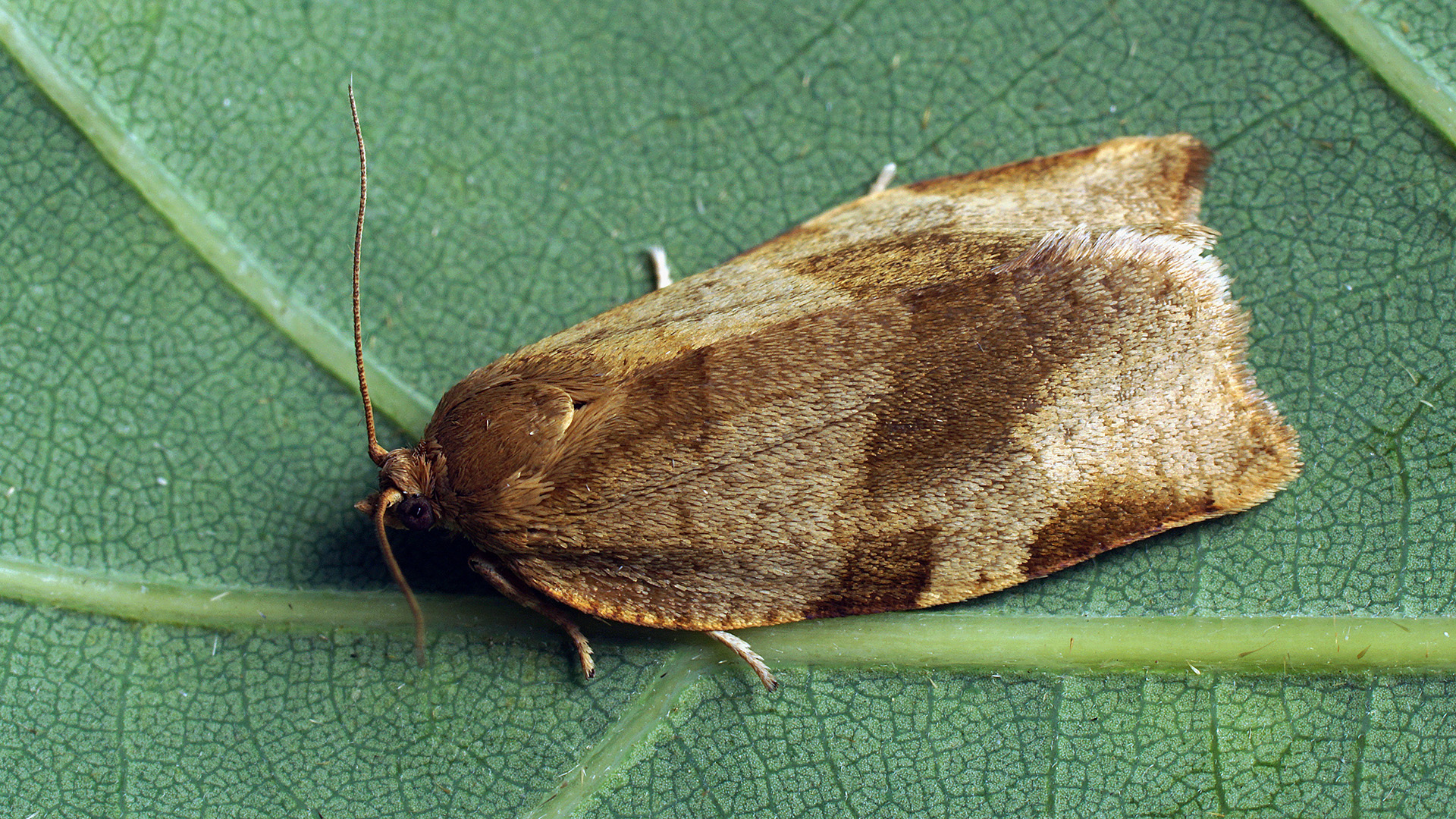

The wingspan is 19–30 mm. The forewing termen is hardly sinuate and vertical. The costal fold is short, not reaching the base. The ground colour is light greyish -ochreous, slightly brownish - tinged The basal patch has a straight oblique edge. The anterior edge of the central fascia is straight and the fascia is almost interrupted above the middle. The costal patch is brown. The hindwings are grey. The larva is grey or olive-green; tubercular spots white; head black; plate of 2 brown, blackish -marked, anterior edge white. Julius von Kennel provides a full description.

The moth flies from May to July.

The larvae feed on species from the genera Betula, Malus, Prunus, Pyrus and Quercus.
