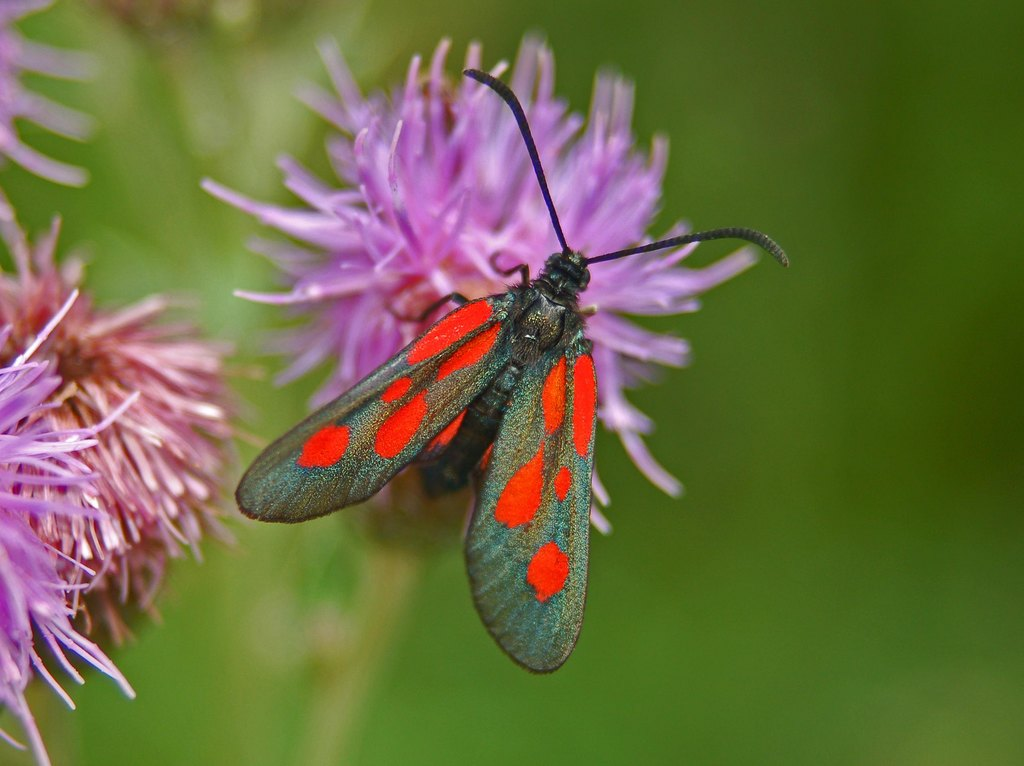

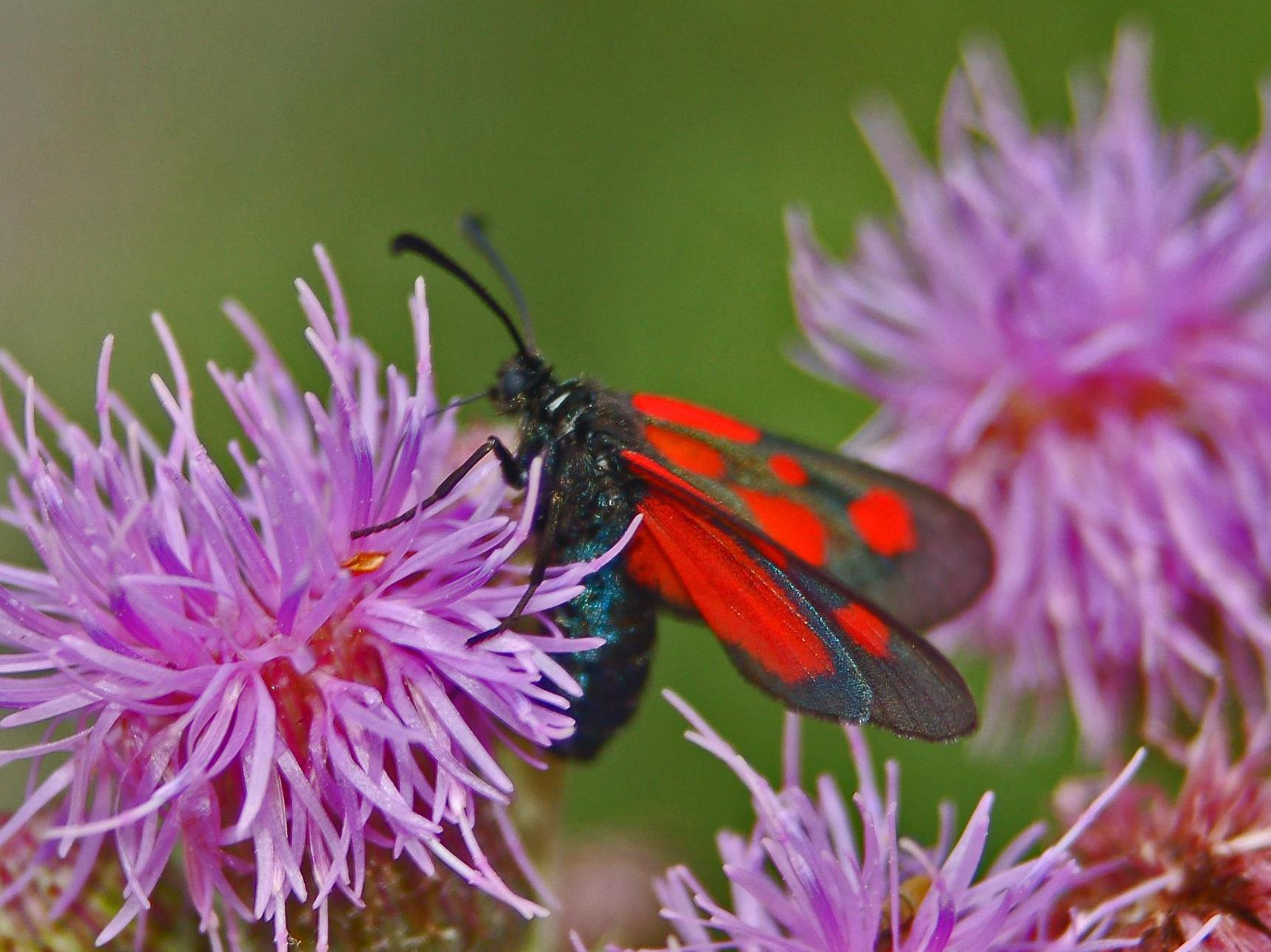

Scientific classification
- Kingdom: Animalia
- Phylum: Arthropoda
- Clade: Pancrustacea
- Class: Insecta
- Order: Lepidoptera
- Family: Zygaenidae
- Genus: Zygaena
- Species: Z. romeo

Binomial name
- Zygaena romeo (Duponchel, 1835)

Synonyms
- Zygaena orion Herrich-Schäffer, 1843; Zygaena celeus Herrich-Schäffer, 1946

= Zygaena romeo =

Species of moth

Zygaena romeo is a moth of the Zygaenidae family.

== Subspecies ==
- Z. r. romeo
- Z. r. adumbrata Burgeff, 1926
- Z. r. calcanei Rauch, 1975
- Z. r. freyeri Lederer, 1853
- Z. r. lozerica Holik, 1944
- Z. r. megorion Burgeiff, 1926
- Z. r. neapolitana Calberla, 1895
- Z. r. orion Herrich-Schaffer, 1843
- Z. r. parvorion Holik, 1944
- Z. r. planeixi Dujardin, 1971

== Distribution ==
This species can bes found in south and southwest Alpine areas, in southern France, in the eastern Pyrenees and in most of Italy.

== Habitat ==
These moths live on bushy forest edge with poor grassland, at an elevation of 500–1,500 metres (1,600–4,900 ft) above sea level.

== Description ==
The wingspan is about 35 millimetres (1.4 in). The basic color of the forewings is dark blue, with various red markings. The 4th marking is drop-shaped and so big that often joins the 2nd marking. In case it does not join the 2nd, the 4th is very larger than the 3rd. Moreover the apex of the front wings is rounded.

This species is very similar to Zygaena osterodensis, but in the latter the five red spots are almost always confluent into each other forming two parallel stripes. Moroeover in Z. osterodensis the apex of the forewings is pointed.

== Biology ==
The larvae feed on Vicia and Lathyrus. They are fully grown between late April and early June, depending on altitude. Adults are on the wing in June and July. They fly during the day.
