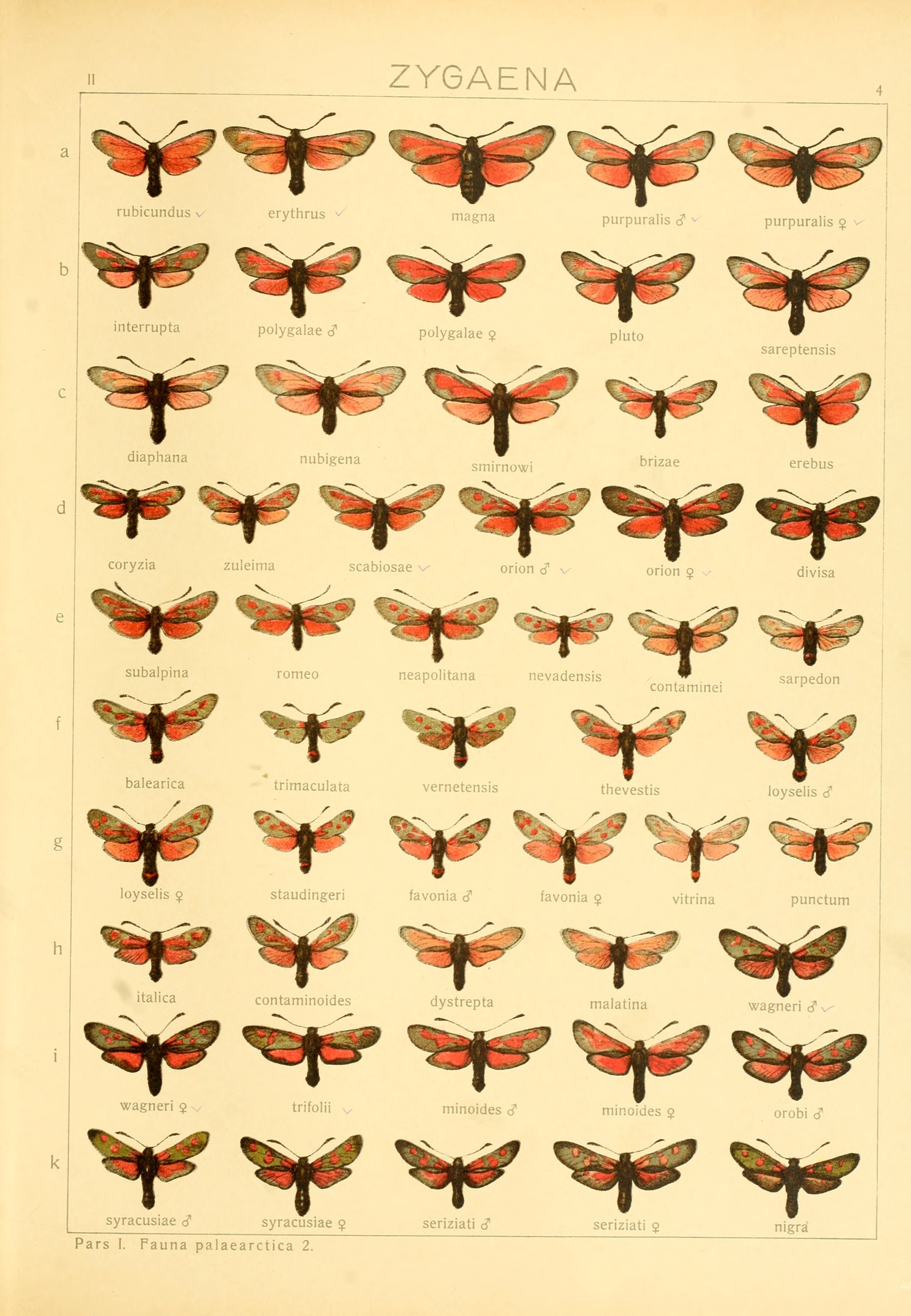

Scientific classification
- Kingdom: Animalia
- Phylum: Arthropoda
- Class: Insecta
- Order: Lepidoptera
- Family: Zygaenidae
- Genus: Zygaena
- Species: Z. nevadensis

Binomial name
- Zygaena nevadensis Rambur, 1858

Synonyms
- Zygaena corycia var. gallica Oberthür, 1898; Zygaena agenjoi Le Charles, 1957; Zygaena falleriana Reiss, 1931; Zygaena panticosica Reiss, 1966; Zygaena kricheldorffi Reiss, 1933; Zygaena gallica f. interrupta Boursin, 1923; Zygaena gallica gieskingiana Reiss, 1930

= Zygaena nevadensis =

Species of moth

Zygaena nevadensis is a species of moth in the Zygaenidae family. It is found in France, Spain, Portugal, Romania, Bulgaria, the Republic of Macedonia, Greece, Russia and North Africa, including Morocco.

The larvae feed on Vicia species (including Vicia cracca and Vicia villosa) and Lathyrus pratensis. The larvae overwinters twice. Pupation takes place in April.

== Subspecies ==
- Zygaena nevadensis nevadensis
- Zygaena nevadensis atlantica Le Charles, 1957 (Morocco)
- Zygaena nevadensis gallica Oberthur, 1898
- Zygaena nevadensis gheorghenica Reiss, 1976
- Zygaena nevadensis interrupta Boursin, 1923
- Zygaena nevadensis pelisterensis Reiss, 1976
- Zygaena nevadensis schmidti Reiss, 1931
- Zygaena nevadensis teberdica Reiss, 1939
