= Scythris siccella =

Scientific classification
- Domain: Eukaryota
- Kingdom: Animalia
- Phylum: Arthropoda
- Class: Insecta
- Order: Lepidoptera
- Family: Scythrididae
- Genus: Scythris
- Species: S. siccella

Binomial name
- Scythris siccella (Zeller, 1839)

Synonyms
- Oecophora siccella Zeller, 1839

Species of moth

Scythris siccella is a moth of the family Scythrididae first described by the German entomologist Philipp Christoph Zeller in 1839, found in Europe.

== Description ==
The moth flies in July and can be found on flowers, preferring dry sandy habitats. It has a wingspan of circa 9 mm.

The larvae can be found in May and are polyphagous, feeding on the following species; kidney vetch (Anthyllis vulneraria), sea thrift (Armeria maritima), chickweed (Cerastium species), common rock-rose (Helianthemum nummularium), common bird's-foot trefoil (Lotus corniculatus), restharrow (Ononis spinosa subsp. procurrens), mouse-ear hawkweed ( Pilosella officinarum), plantain (Plantago species), small scabious (Scabiosa columbaria), thyme (Thymus species) and rock-rose (Tuberaria species). Larvae form a tube made from grains of sand and silk attached to the stem of the plant and mine into the leaves. Pupation is in a silken cocoon just below the surface of the sand.

== Distribution ==
The moth is found in Europe. In Great Britain it is known only from Chesil Beach, Dorset.
