= Actihema fibigeri =

Scientific classification
- Domain: Eukaryota
- Kingdom: Animalia
- Phylum: Arthropoda
- Class: Insecta
- Order: Lepidoptera
- Family: Tortricidae
- Genus: Actihema
- Species: A. fibigeri

Binomial name
- Actihema fibigeri Aarvik, 2010

Species of moth

Actihema fibigeri is a species of moth of the family Tortricidae. It is found in Uganda. The habitat consists of the edges of mountainous rainforests.

The wingspan is about 14 mm.

== Etymology ==
The species is named after Michael Fibiger.
