= Actihema simpsonae =

Scientific classification
- Domain: Eukaryota
- Kingdom: Animalia
- Phylum: Arthropoda
- Class: Insecta
- Order: Lepidoptera
- Family: Tortricidae
- Genus: Actihema
- Species: A. simpsonae

Binomial name
- Actihema simpsonae Aarvik, 2010

Species of moth

Actihema simpsonae is a species of moth of the family Tortricidae.

== Distribution and habitation ==
It is found in Kenya. The habitat consists of high altitude grassland and mixed scrub.

== Description ==
The wingspan is 16–17 mm.
