= Afropoecilia =

Scientific classification
- Kingdom: Animalia
- Phylum: Arthropoda
- Class: Insecta
- Order: Lepidoptera
- Family: Tortricidae
- Tribe: Cochylini
- Genus: Afropoecilia; Aarvik, 2010
- Species: A. kituloensis

Binomial name
- Afropoecilia kituloensis Aarvik, 2010

Genus of moths

Afropoecilia is a genus of moths in the family Tortricidae. It consists of only one species, Afropoecilia kituloensis, which is found in Tanzania.

== Description ==
The wingspan is 14–17 mm.

== Etymology ==
The specific name refers to the Kitulo Plateau, the type locality.
