= Actihema msituni =

Scientific classification
- Domain: Eukaryota
- Kingdom: Animalia
- Phylum: Arthropoda
- Class: Insecta
- Order: Lepidoptera
- Family: Tortricidae
- Genus: Actihema
- Species: A. msituni

Binomial name
- Actihema msituni Aarvik, 2010

Species of moth

Actihema msituni is a species of moth in the family Tortricidae. It is found in Kenya.

The wingspan is about 14 mm.
