= Eupinivora unicolora =

Scientific classification
- Kingdom: Animalia
- Phylum: Arthropoda
- Clade: Pancrustacea
- Class: Insecta
- Order: Lepidoptera
- Family: Tortricidae
- Genus: Eupinivora
- Species: E. unicolora

Binomial name
- Eupinivora unicolora J.W. Brown, 2013

Species of moth

Eupinivora unicolora is a species of moth of the family Tortricidae. It is found in the mountains of Durango in Mexico.

The length of the forewings is 7–9 mm for males and 8–9 mm for females.

Larvae were reared on Pinus arizonica var. copperi.

== Etymology ==
The species name refers to the nearly uniform rust colour of the forewing.
