= Eupinivora albolineana =

Scientific classification
- Kingdom: Animalia
- Phylum: Arthropoda
- Clade: Pancrustacea
- Class: Insecta
- Order: Lepidoptera
- Family: Tortricidae
- Genus: Eupinivora
- Species: E. albolineana

Binomial name
- Eupinivora albolineana J.W. Brown, 2013

Species of moth

Eupinivora albolineana is a species of moth of the family Tortricidae. It is found in mountains of Durango in Mexico.

The length of the forewings is 10–10.5 mm.

Larvae have been reared on Pinus arizonica var. cooperi.

== Etymology ==
The species name refers to the white linear patch of the forewing.
