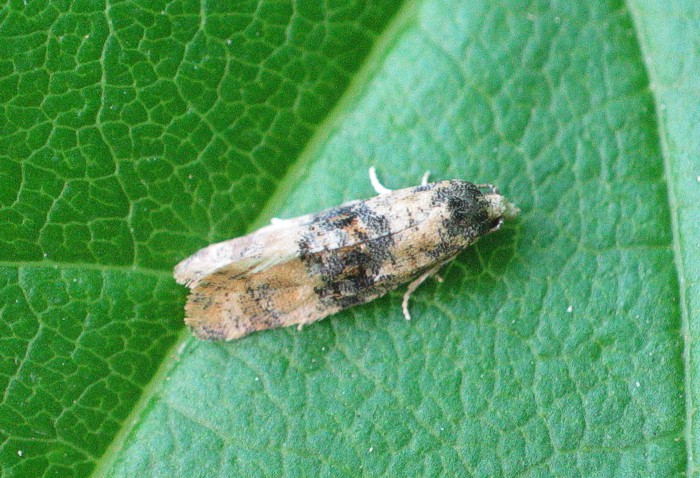
- Cochylis nana

Scientific classification
- Kingdom: Animalia
- Phylum: Arthropoda
- Clade: Pancrustacea
- Class: Insecta
- Order: Lepidoptera
- Family: Tortricidae
- Subfamily: Tortricinae
- Tribe: Cochylini; Guenee, 1845

Genera
- See text

Synonyms
- Conchylinae [Dunning and Pickard], [1859]; Cochylidae; Phaloniidae Meyrick, 1895; Hysterosiinae Heslop, 1938

= Cochylini =

Tribe of moths

The Cochylini are a tribe of tortrix moths. It used to be classified as the subfamily Cochylinae.

== Diversity ==
The tribe contains about 1,000 described species in about 80 genera.

== Distribution ==
Members of the tribe are present worldwide, but the greatest number of species occurs in the Holarctic realm and Neotropical realm.

== Biology ==
Larvae are mostly internal feeders in seeds, stalks and roots.

== Taxonomy ==
Research by Regier et al. in 2012 provided fairly convincing evidence that Cochylini are a monophyletic lineage within a broader Euliini. If this is accepted, Cochylini should be treated as subtribe Cochylina of Euliini.

== Genera ==
Acarolella
Actihema
Aethes
Aethesoides
Afropoecilia
Agapeta
Amallectis
Anielia
Aphalonia
Aprepodoxa
Banhadoa
Belemgena
Caraccochylis
Cartagogena
Ceratoxanthis
Chloanohieris
Cirrothaumatia
Cochylidia
Cochylidichnium
Cochylimorpha
Cochylis
Combosclera
Commophila
Coristaca
Cryptocochylis
Deltophalonia
Diceratura
Dinophalia
Empedcochylis
Enallcochylis
Eugnosta
Eupinivora
Eupoecilia
Falseuncaria
Fulvoclysia
Geitocochylis
Gryposcleroma
Gynnidomorpha
Henricus
Hypostromatia
Hysterophora
Imashpania
Juxtolena
Lasiothyris
Lincicochylis
Lorita
Macasinia
Maricaona
Marylinka
Mielkeana
Mimcochylis
Mimeugnosta
Monoceratuncus
Mourecochylis
Oligobalia
Parirazona
Perlorita
Phalonidia
Phaniola
Phtheochroa
Phtheochroides
Planaltinella
Platphalonia
Plesiocochylis
Prochlidonia
Prohysterophora
Revertuncaria
Rigidsociaria
Rudenia
Saphenista
Spinipogon
Tambomachaya
Tenoa
Thysanphalonia
Velhoania
Vermilphalonia

== Selected unplaced species ==
Phalonia pimana Busck, 1907
Phalonia yuccatana Busck, 1907

== Former genera ==
Carolella
Platphalonidia
Rolandylis
Thyraylia
Trachybyrsis
