= Actihema jirani =

Scientific classification
- Domain: Eukaryota
- Kingdom: Animalia
- Phylum: Arthropoda
- Class: Insecta
- Order: Lepidoptera
- Family: Tortricidae
- Genus: Actihema
- Species: A. jirani

Binomial name
- Actihema jirani Aarvik, 2010

Species of moth

Actihema jirani is a species of moth of the family Tortricidae. It is found in Uganda. The habitat consists of open spaces close to mountainous rainforests.

The wingspan is 12–15 mm.
