= Dinophalia =

Scientific classification
- Kingdom: Animalia
- Phylum: Arthropoda
- Clade: Pancrustacea
- Class: Insecta
- Order: Lepidoptera
- Family: Tortricidae
- Tribe: Cochylini
- Genus: Dinophalia; Razowski & Becker, 1993

Genus of tortrix moths

Dinophalia is a genus of moths belonging to the family Tortricidae.

== Species ==
- Dinophalia egregia Razowski & Becker, 1993

== See also ==
- List of Tortricidae genera
