= Caraccochylis =

Scientific classification
- Kingdom: Animalia
- Phylum: Arthropoda
- Clade: Pancrustacea
- Class: Insecta
- Order: Lepidoptera
- Family: Tortricidae
- Tribe: Cochylini
- Genus: Caraccochylis; Razowski & Becker, 2007
- Species: C. framea

Binomial name
- Caraccochylis framea Razowski & Becker, 2007

Monotypic genus of tortrix moths

Caraccochylis is a genus of moths in the family Tortricidae. It consists of only one species, Caraccochylis framea, which is found in Minas Gerais, Brazil.

The wingspan is about 11 mm.
