= Vermilphalonia chytosema =

Scientific classification
- Kingdom: Animalia
- Phylum: Arthropoda
- Clade: Pancrustacea
- Class: Insecta
- Order: Lepidoptera
- Family: Tortricidae
- Genus: Vermilphalonia
- Species: V. chytosema

Binomial name
- Vermilphalonia chytosema Razowski & Becker, 2003

Species of moth

Vermilphalonia chytosema is a species of moth of the family Tortricidae. It is found in the state of Rio de Janeiro, Brazil.
