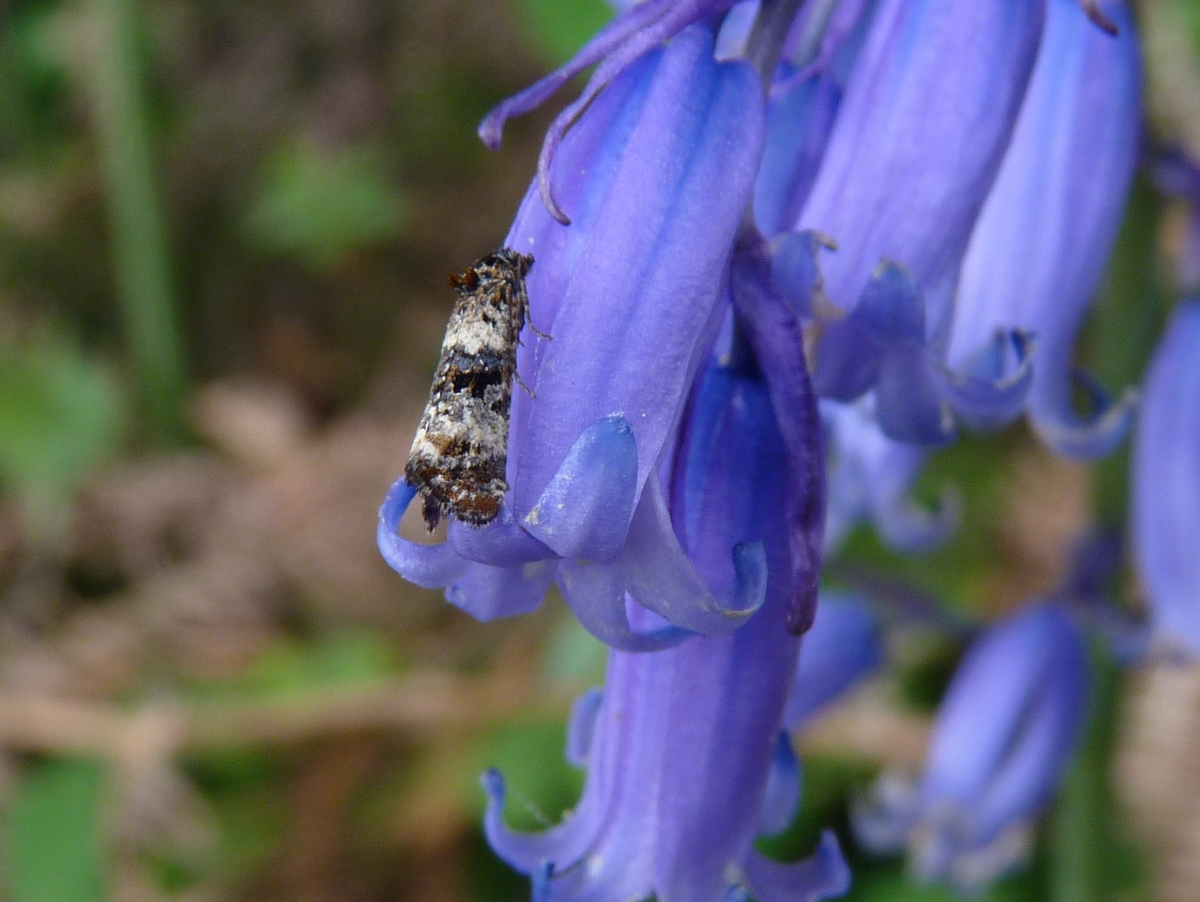
- Hysterophora maculosana on foodplant

Scientific classification
- Kingdom: Animalia
- Phylum: Arthropoda
- Class: Insecta
- Order: Lepidoptera
- Family: Tortricidae
- Tribe: Cochylini
- Genus: Hysterophora; Razowski, 1992

Synonyms
- Obraztsoviana Razowski, 1960

= Hysterophora =

Genus of tortrix moths

Hysterophora is a genus of moths belonging to the family Tortricidae.

== Species ==
- Hysterophora maculosana (Haworth, [1811])

== See also ==
- List of Tortricidae genera
