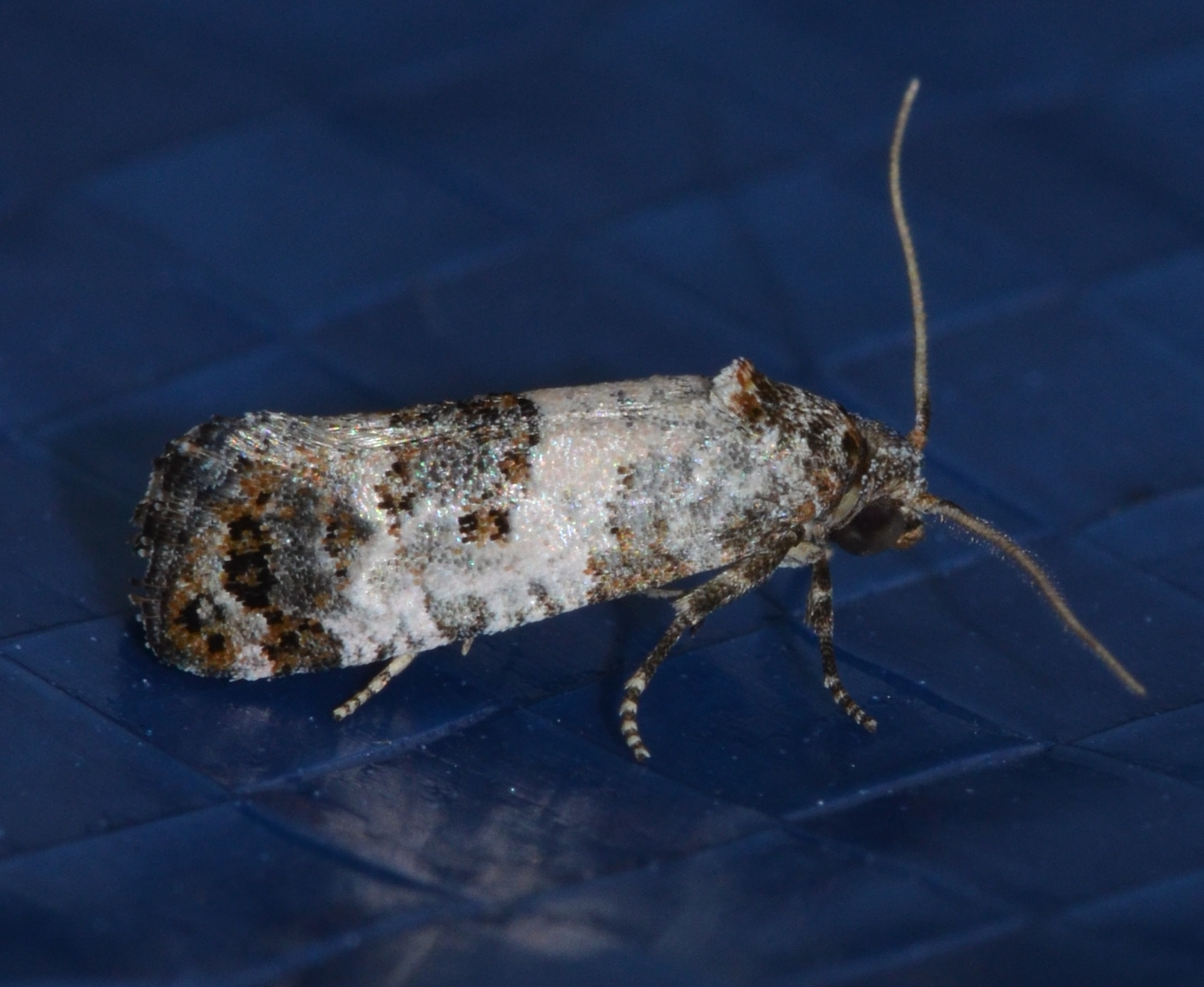

Scientific classification
- Domain: Eukaryota
- Kingdom: Animalia
- Phylum: Arthropoda
- Class: Insecta
- Order: Lepidoptera
- Family: Tortricidae
- Genus: Rudenia
- Species: R. leguminana

Binomial name
- Rudenia leguminana (Busck, 1907)

Synonyms
- Phalonia leguminana Busck, 1907; Phtheochroa leguminana

= Rudenia leguminana =

Species of moth

Rudenia leguminana, the black-tipped rudenia moth, is a species of moth of the family Tortricidae. It is found in the United States, from southern Connecticut to Florida, and from the mid-west to California. It is also found in Mexico, where it has been recorded from Sinaloa, Puebla, Nuevo León and Coahuila.

The length of the forewings is 6–7 mm.

The larvae feed on various Fabaceae species, including Prosopis glandulosa and Parkinsonia aculeata. They have also been recorded feeding on pods of Gleditsia japonica.
