= Tambomachaya pollexifera =

Scientific classification
- Kingdom: Animalia
- Phylum: Arthropoda
- Class: Insecta
- Order: Lepidoptera
- Family: Tortricidae
- Genus: Tambomachaya
- Species: T. pollexifera

Binomial name
- Tambomachaya pollexifera Razowski, 1989

Species of moth

Tambomachaya pollexifera is a species of moth of the family Tortricidae. It is found in Peru.
