= Deltophalonia =

Scientific classification
- Kingdom: Animalia
- Phylum: Arthropoda
- Clade: Pancrustacea
- Class: Insecta
- Order: Lepidoptera
- Family: Tortricidae
- Tribe: Cochylini
- Genus: Deltophalonia; Razowski & Becker, 2003

Genus of tortrix moths

Deltophalonia is a genus of moths which belongs to the family Tortricidae.

== Species ==
- Deltophalonia chlidonibrya Razowski & Becker, 2003
- Deltophalonia deltochlaena (Meyrick, 1930)
- Deltophalonia embrithopa (Meyrick, 1927)
- Deltophalonia huanuci Razowski & Wojtusiak, 2010
- Deltophalonia indanzae Razowski & Becker, 2007
- Deltophalonia obscura Razowski & Wojtusiak, 2008
- Deltophalonia sucuma Razowski & Becker, 2010
- Deltophalonia termasia Razowski & Wojtusiak, 2009

== See also ==
- List of Tortricidae genera
