= Monoceratuncus conviva =

Scientific classification
- Kingdom: Animalia
- Phylum: Arthropoda
- Class: Insecta
- Order: Lepidoptera
- Family: Tortricidae
- Genus: Monoceratuncus
- Species: M. conviva

Binomial name
- Monoceratuncus conviva (Razowski, 1990)

Synonyms
- Cochylis conviva Razowski, 1990

Species of moth

Monoceratuncus conviva is a species of moth of the family Tortricidae. It is found in Guerrero, Mexico.
