= Monoceratuncus autolytus =

Scientific classification
- Kingdom: Animalia
- Phylum: Arthropoda
- Class: Insecta
- Order: Lepidoptera
- Family: Tortricidae
- Genus: Monoceratuncus
- Species: M. autolytus

Binomial name
- Monoceratuncus autolytus (Razowski, 1986)

Synonyms
- Ceratuncus autolytus Razowski, 1986

Species of moth

Monoceratuncus autolytus is a species of moth of the family Tortricidae. It is found in Sinaloa, Mexico.
