= Deltophalonia deltochlaena =

Scientific classification
- Kingdom: Animalia
- Phylum: Arthropoda
- Class: Insecta
- Order: Lepidoptera
- Family: Tortricidae
- Genus: Deltophalonia
- Species: D. deltochlaena

Binomial name
- Deltophalonia deltochlaena (Meyrick, 1930)

Synonyms
- Phtheochroa deltochlaena Meyrick, 1930

Species of moth

Deltophalonia deltochlaena is a species of moth of the family Tortricidae. It is found in Bolivia.
