= Parirazona sobrina =

Scientific classification
- Kingdom: Animalia
- Phylum: Arthropoda
- Class: Insecta
- Order: Lepidoptera
- Family: Tortricidae
- Genus: Parirazona
- Species: P. sobrina

Binomial name
- Parirazona sobrina Razowski & Becker, 1993

Species of moth

Parirazona sobrina is a species of moth of the family Tortricidae. It is found in Santa Catarina, Brazil.
