= Thysanphalonia =

Scientific classification
- Kingdom: Animalia
- Phylum: Arthropoda
- Clade: Pancrustacea
- Class: Insecta
- Order: Lepidoptera
- Family: Tortricidae
- Tribe: Cochylini
- Genus: Thysanphalonia; Razowski & Becker, 1986

Genus of tortrix moths

Thysanphalonia is a genus of moths belonging to the family Tortricidae.

== Species ==
- Thysanphalonia cirrhites Razowski & Becker, 1986

== See also ==
- List of Tortricidae genera
