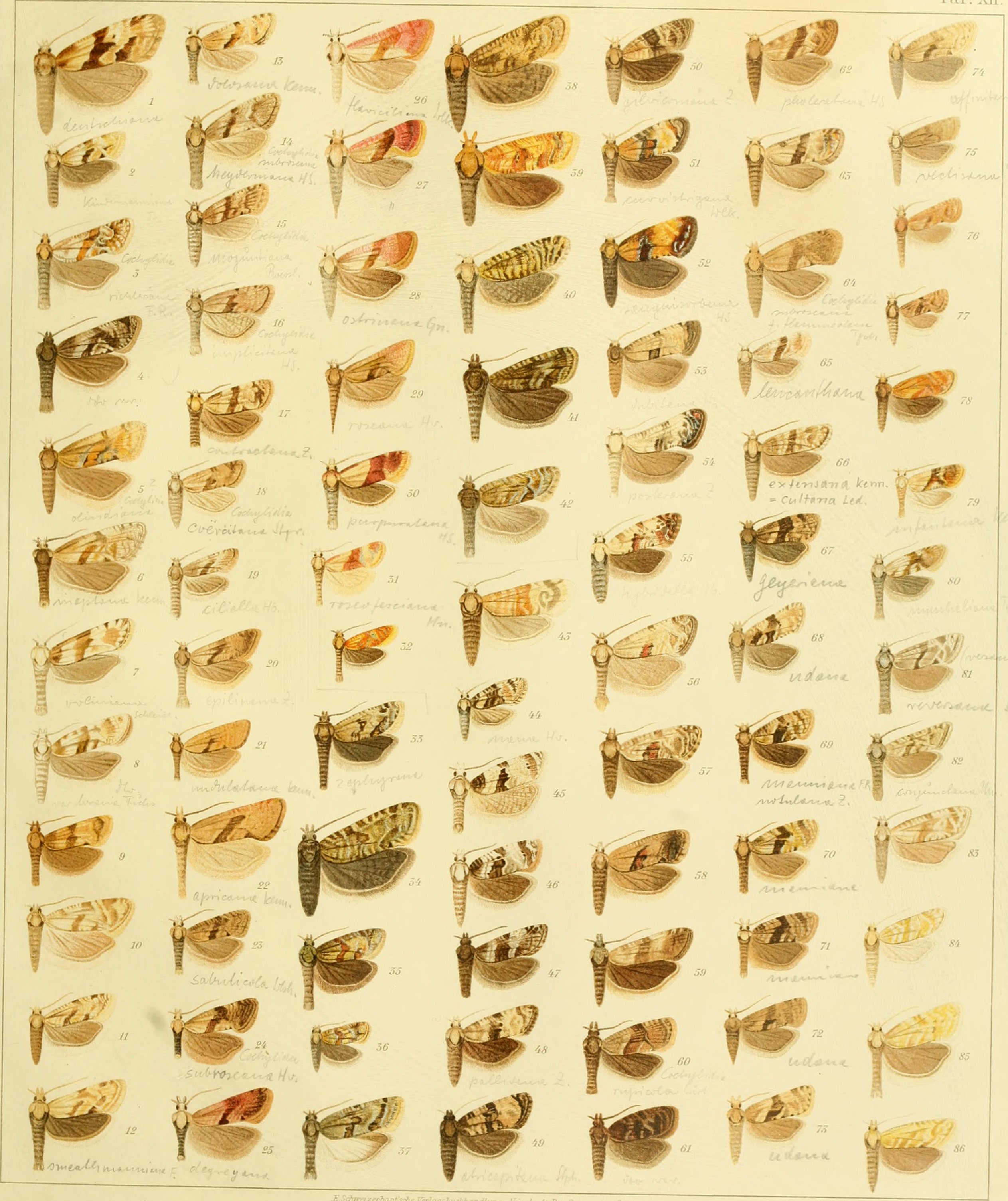
- in Kennel Die palaearktischen tortriciden figure 31 male, 65 female

Scientific classification
- Domain: Eukaryota
- Kingdom: Animalia
- Phylum: Arthropoda
- Class: Insecta
- Order: Lepidoptera
- Family: Tortricidae
- Genus: Diceratura
- Species: D. roseofasciana

Binomial name
- Diceratura roseofasciana (Mann, 1855)

Synonyms
- Cochylis roseofasciana Mann, 1855; Conchylis aeguana Razowski, 1964; Conchylis aequana Caradja, 1916; Conchylis leucanthana Constant, 1888; Diceratura keredjana Razowski, 1963

= Diceratura roseofasciana =

Species of moth

Diceratura roseofasciana is a species of moth of the family Tortricidae. It is found in southern Europe (from Portugal to Romania, Ukraine and European Russia) and in Asia Minor, Iran (Khuzestan Province), Transcaucasia and Kazakhstan.

The wingspan is 9–13 mm. Adults are on wing from May to August.
