= Actihema hemiacta =

Scientific classification
- Kingdom: Animalia
- Phylum: Arthropoda
- Class: Insecta
- Order: Lepidoptera
- Family: Tortricidae
- Genus: Actihema
- Species: A. hemiacta

Binomial name
- Actihema hemiacta (Meyrick, 1920)

Synonyms
- Hysterosia hemiacta Meyrick, 1920

Species of moth

Actihema hemiacta is a species of moth of the family Tortricidae. It is found in Kenya and Tanzania.

The wingspan is 14–18 mm.
