= Rigidsociaria erinaceola =

Scientific classification
- Kingdom: Animalia
- Phylum: Arthropoda
- Class: Insecta
- Order: Lepidoptera
- Family: Tortricidae
- Genus: Rigidsociaria
- Species: R. erinaceola

Binomial name
- Rigidsociaria erinaceola Razowski, 1986

Species of moth

Rigidsociaria erinaceola is a species of moth of the family Tortricidae. It is found in Sinaloa, Mexico.
