= Oligobalia viettei =

Scientific classification
- Kingdom: Animalia
- Phylum: Arthropoda
- Class: Insecta
- Order: Lepidoptera
- Family: Tortricidae
- Genus: Oligobalia
- Species: O. viettei

Binomial name
- Oligobalia viettei Diakonoff, 1988

Species of moth

Oligobalia viettei is a species of moth of the family Tortricidae. It is found on Madagascar.
