= Monoceratuncus lugens =

Scientific classification
- Kingdom: Animalia
- Phylum: Arthropoda
- Clade: Pancrustacea
- Class: Insecta
- Order: Lepidoptera
- Family: Tortricidae
- Genus: Monoceratuncus
- Species: M. lugens

Binomial name
- Monoceratuncus lugens (Razowski & Becker, 1986)

Synonyms
- Ceratuncus lugens Razowski & Becker, 1986; Ceratuncus lugenes Razowski & Becker, 1986

Species of moth

Monoceratuncus lugens is a species of moth of the family Tortricidae. It is found in Puebla, Mexico.
