= Aethesoides distigmatana =

Scientific classification
- Kingdom: Animalia
- Phylum: Arthropoda
- Class: Insecta
- Order: Lepidoptera
- Family: Tortricidae
- Genus: Aethesoides
- Species: A. distigmatana

Binomial name
- Aethesoides distigmatana (Walsingham, 1897)

Synonyms
- Phalonia distigmatana Walsingham, 1897

Species of moth

Aethesoides distigmatana is a species of moth of the family Tortricidae. It is found on Cuba, St. Croix, St. Vincent and Grenada.

The wingspan is about 9 mm. The forewings are whitish ochreous, with three dark fawn-brown costal spots. The extreme base of the costa is also fawn brown. The hindwings are greyish.
