= Aethesoides stellans =

Scientific classification
- Kingdom: Animalia
- Phylum: Arthropoda
- Clade: Pancrustacea
- Class: Insecta
- Order: Lepidoptera
- Family: Tortricidae
- Genus: Aethesoides
- Species: A. stellans

Binomial name
- Aethesoides stellans Razowski & Becker, 1994

Species of moth

Aethesoides stellans is a species of moth of the family Tortricidae. It is found in Santa Catarina, Brazil.
