= Parirazona serena =

Scientific classification
- Domain: Eukaryota
- Kingdom: Animalia
- Phylum: Arthropoda
- Class: Insecta
- Order: Lepidoptera
- Family: Tortricidae
- Genus: Parirazona
- Species: P. serena

Binomial name
- Parirazona serena (Clarke, 1968)

Synonyms
- Cochylis serena Clarke, 1968

Species of moth

Parirazona serena is a species of moth of the family Tortricidae. It is found in Santa Catarina, Brazil.
