= Ceratoxanthis saratovica =

Scientific classification
- Domain: Eukaryota
- Kingdom: Animalia
- Phylum: Arthropoda
- Class: Insecta
- Order: Lepidoptera
- Family: Tortricidae
- Genus: Ceratoxanthis
- Species: C. saratovica

Binomial name
- Ceratoxanthis saratovica Trematerra, 2010

Species of moth

Ceratoxanthis saratovica is a species of moth of the family Tortricidae. It is found in south-eastern European Russia.
