= Spinipogon resthavenensis =

Scientific classification
- Domain: Eukaryota
- Kingdom: Animalia
- Phylum: Arthropoda
- Class: Insecta
- Order: Lepidoptera
- Family: Tortricidae
- Genus: Spinipogon
- Species: S. resthavenensis

Binomial name
- Spinipogon resthavenensis Metzler & Sabourin, 2002

Species of moth

Spinipogon resthavenensis is a species of moth of the family Tortricidae. It is found in North America, where it has been recorded from Ontario and Ohio to Florida and Texas. The habitat consists of tallgrass prairies.

The wingspan is about 9 mm. Adults have been recorded on wing in July.

== Etymology ==
The species is named to honor the prairies at Resthaven Wildlife Area at Castalia, Ohio.
