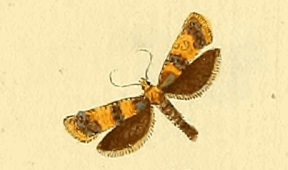
- Commophila aeneana

Scientific classification
- Kingdom: Animalia
- Phylum: Arthropoda
- Class: Insecta
- Order: Lepidoptera
- Family: Tortricidae
- Tribe: Cochylini
- Genus: Commophila; Razowski, 1999

= Commophila =

Genus of tortrix moths

Commophila is a genus of moths belonging to the family Tortricidae.

== Species ==
- Commophila aeneana (Hübner, [1799-1800])
- Commophila nevadensis (Traugott-Olsen, 1990)

== See also ==
- List of Tortricidae genera
