= Revertuncaria spathula =

Scientific classification
- Kingdom: Animalia
- Phylum: Arthropoda
- Class: Insecta
- Order: Lepidoptera
- Family: Tortricidae
- Genus: Revertuncaria
- Species: R. spathula

Binomial name
- Revertuncaria spathula Razowski, 1986

Species of moth

Revertuncaria spathula is a species of moth of the family Tortricidae. It is found in Sonora, Mexico.
