= Deltophalonia indanzae =

Scientific classification
- Kingdom: Animalia
- Phylum: Arthropoda
- Clade: Pancrustacea
- Class: Insecta
- Order: Lepidoptera
- Family: Tortricidae
- Genus: Deltophalonia
- Species: D. indanzae

Binomial name
- Deltophalonia indanzae Razowski & Becker, 2007

Species of moth

Deltophalonia indanzae is a species of moth of the family Tortricidae. It is found in Morona-Santiago Province, Ecuador.

The wingspan is 20–24 mm.

== Etymology ==
The species name refers to the type locality, Morona, Indanza.
