= Actihema =

Scientific classification
- Domain: Eukaryota
- Kingdom: Animalia
- Phylum: Arthropoda
- Class: Insecta
- Order: Lepidoptera
- Family: Tortricidae
- Tribe: Cochylini
- Genus: Actihema; Razowski, 1993

Genus of tortrix moths

Actihema is a genus of moths belonging to the subfamily Tortricinae of the family Tortricidae.

== Species ==
- Actihema fibigeri Aarvik, 2010
- Actihema hemiacta (Meyrick, 1920)
- Actihema jirani Aarvik, 2010
- Actihema msituni Aarvik, 2010
- Actihema simpsonae Aarvik, 2010

== See also ==
- List of Tortricidae genera
