= Rudenia nigrans =

Scientific classification
- Kingdom: Animalia
- Phylum: Arthropoda
- Class: Insecta
- Order: Lepidoptera
- Family: Tortricidae
- Genus: Rudenia
- Species: R. nigrans

Binomial name
- Rudenia nigrans Razowski, 1985

Species of moth

Rudenia nigrans is a species of moth of the family Tortricidae. It is found in Baja California Sur, Mexico.
