= Eupinivora ponderosae =

Scientific classification
- Kingdom: Animalia
- Phylum: Arthropoda
- Clade: Pancrustacea
- Class: Insecta
- Order: Lepidoptera
- Family: Tortricidae
- Genus: Eupinivora
- Species: E. ponderosae

Binomial name
- Eupinivora ponderosae J.W. Brown, 2013

Species of moth

Eupinivora ponderosae is a species of moth of the family Tortricidae. It is found in the montane regions of the western United States from Nevada, Utah, Wyoming and Colorado, south to Arizona and New Mexico and east to Texas. The habitat consists of conifer-dominated areas at elevations ranging from 1,700 to 2,700 meters.

The length of the forewings is 7.5–9 mm for males and 8.5–9.5 mm for females. Adult have been recorded on wing from June to July, although there is a single record from late May (Texas).

The larvae have been reared from Pinus ponderosa

== Etymology ==
The species name refers to the putative larval host and dominant tree in its habitat, the ponderosa pine (Pinus ponderosa).
