= Ceratoxanthis adriatica =

Scientific classification
- Domain: Eukaryota
- Kingdom: Animalia
- Phylum: Arthropoda
- Class: Insecta
- Order: Lepidoptera
- Family: Tortricidae
- Genus: Ceratoxanthis
- Species: C. adriatica

Binomial name
- Ceratoxanthis adriatica Elsner & Jaro, 2003

Species of moth

Ceratoxanthis adriatica is a species of moth of the family Tortricidae. It is found in former Yugoslavia. The habitat consists of dry slopes near the Adriatic Sea.

The wingspan is about 20 mm.
