= Eupinivora hamartopenis =

Scientific classification
- Kingdom: Animalia
- Phylum: Arthropoda
- Class: Insecta
- Order: Lepidoptera
- Family: Tortricidae
- Genus: Eupinivora
- Species: E. hamartopenis

Binomial name
- Eupinivora hamartopenis (Razowski, 1986)

Synonyms
- Phtheochroa hamartopenis Razowski, 1986

Species of moth

Eupinivora hamartopenis is a species of moth of the family Tortricidae. It is found in Durango, Mexico.

The length of the forewings is 7.5–8.5 mm for males and 8.5–9 mm for females.

The larvae probably feed on Pinus species.

== Etymology ==
The species name is derived from Greek hamarto (meaning sin, error) and penis or intromittent organ.
