= Aprepodoxa glycitis =

Scientific classification
- Kingdom: Animalia
- Phylum: Arthropoda
- Class: Insecta
- Order: Lepidoptera
- Family: Tortricidae
- Genus: Aprepodoxa
- Species: A. glycitis

Binomial name
- Aprepodoxa glycitis (Meyrick, 1928)

Synonyms
- Phalonia glycitis Meyrick, 1928

Species of moth

Aprepodoxa glycitis is a species of moth of the family Tortricidae. It is found in Assam, India.
