= Phalonia pimana =

"Phalonia" pimana

Scientific classification
- Kingdom: Animalia
- Phylum: Arthropoda
- Clade: Pancrustacea
- Class: Insecta
- Order: Lepidoptera
- Family: Tortricidae
- Subfamily: Tortricinae
- Tribe: Cochylini
- Genus: incertae sedis
- Species: "P." pimana

Binomial name
- "Phalonia" pimana Busck, 1907

Synonyms
- Cochylis pimana; Nycthia pimana

Species of moth

"Phalonia" pimana is a species of moth of the family Tortricidae. It is found in North America, where it has been recorded from Arizona and California. It has also been recorded from Hispaniola.

The wingspan is about 16 mm. Adults have been recorded on wing in March and from August to September.

The larvae feed on Agave species.
