= Gryposcleroma =

Scientific classification
- Kingdom: Animalia
- Phylum: Arthropoda
- Class: Insecta
- Order: Lepidoptera
- Family: Tortricidae
- Tribe: Cochylini
- Genus: Gryposcleroma; Razowski, 1986

Genus of tortrix moths

Gryposcleroma is a genus of moths belonging to the family Tortricidae.

== Species ==
- Gryposcleroma schidia Razowski, 1986

== See also ==
- List of Tortricidae genera
