= Prohysterophora =

Scientific classification
- Kingdom: Animalia
- Phylum: Arthropoda
- Class: Insecta
- Order: Lepidoptera
- Family: Tortricidae
- Tribe: Cochylini
- Genus: Prohysterophora; Razowski, 1961

Synonyms
- Prohysterophoria Razowski, 1961

Genus of tortrix moths

Prohysterophora is a genus of moths belonging to the family Tortricidae.

== Species ==
- Prohysterophora chionopa (Meyrick, 1891)

== See also ==
- List of Tortricidae genera
