= Vermilphalonia =

Scientific classification
- Kingdom: Animalia
- Phylum: Arthropoda
- Clade: Pancrustacea
- Class: Insecta
- Order: Lepidoptera
- Family: Tortricidae
- Tribe: Cochylini
- Genus: Vermilphalonia; Razowski & Becker, 2003

Genus of tortrix moths

Vermilphalonia is a genus of moths belonging to the subfamily Tortricinae of the family Tortricidae.

== Species ==
- Vermilphalonia chytosema Razowski & Becker, 2003

== See also ==
- List of Tortricidae genera
