= Aethesoides enclitica =

Scientific classification
- Kingdom: Animalia
- Phylum: Arthropoda
- Class: Insecta
- Order: Lepidoptera
- Family: Tortricidae
- Genus: Aethesoides
- Species: A. enclitica

Binomial name
- Aethesoides enclitica (Meyrick, 1917)

Synonyms
- Phalonia enclitica Meyrick, 1917

Species of moth

Aethesoides enclitica is a species of moth of the family Tortricidae. It is found in Ecuador.
