= Phtheochroides =

Scientific classification
- Domain: Eukaryota
- Kingdom: Animalia
- Phylum: Arthropoda
- Class: Insecta
- Order: Lepidoptera
- Family: Tortricidae
- Tribe: Cochylini
- Genus: Phtheochroides; Obraztsov, 1943

Synonyms
- Phtheochroires Razowski, 1960

Genus of tortrix moths

Phtheochroides is a genus of moths belonging to the family Tortricidae.

== Species ==
- Phtheochroides apicana (Walsingham, 1900)
- Phtheochroides clandestina Razowski, 1968

== See also ==
- List of Tortricidae genera
