= Dinophalia egregia =

Scientific classification
- Kingdom: Animalia
- Phylum: Arthropoda
- Clade: Pancrustacea
- Class: Insecta
- Order: Lepidoptera
- Family: Tortricidae
- Genus: Dinophalia
- Species: D. egregia

Binomial name
- Dinophalia egregia Razowski & Becker, 1993

Species of moth

Dinophalia egregia is a species of moth of the family Tortricidae. It is found in Costa Rica.
