= Mimeugnosta chascax =

Scientific classification
- Kingdom: Animalia
- Phylum: Arthropoda
- Class: Insecta
- Order: Lepidoptera
- Family: Tortricidae
- Genus: Mimeugnosta
- Species: M. chascax

Binomial name
- Mimeugnosta chascax Razowski, 1994

Species of moth

Mimeugnosta chascax is a species of moth of the family Tortricidae. It is found in Costa Rica.
