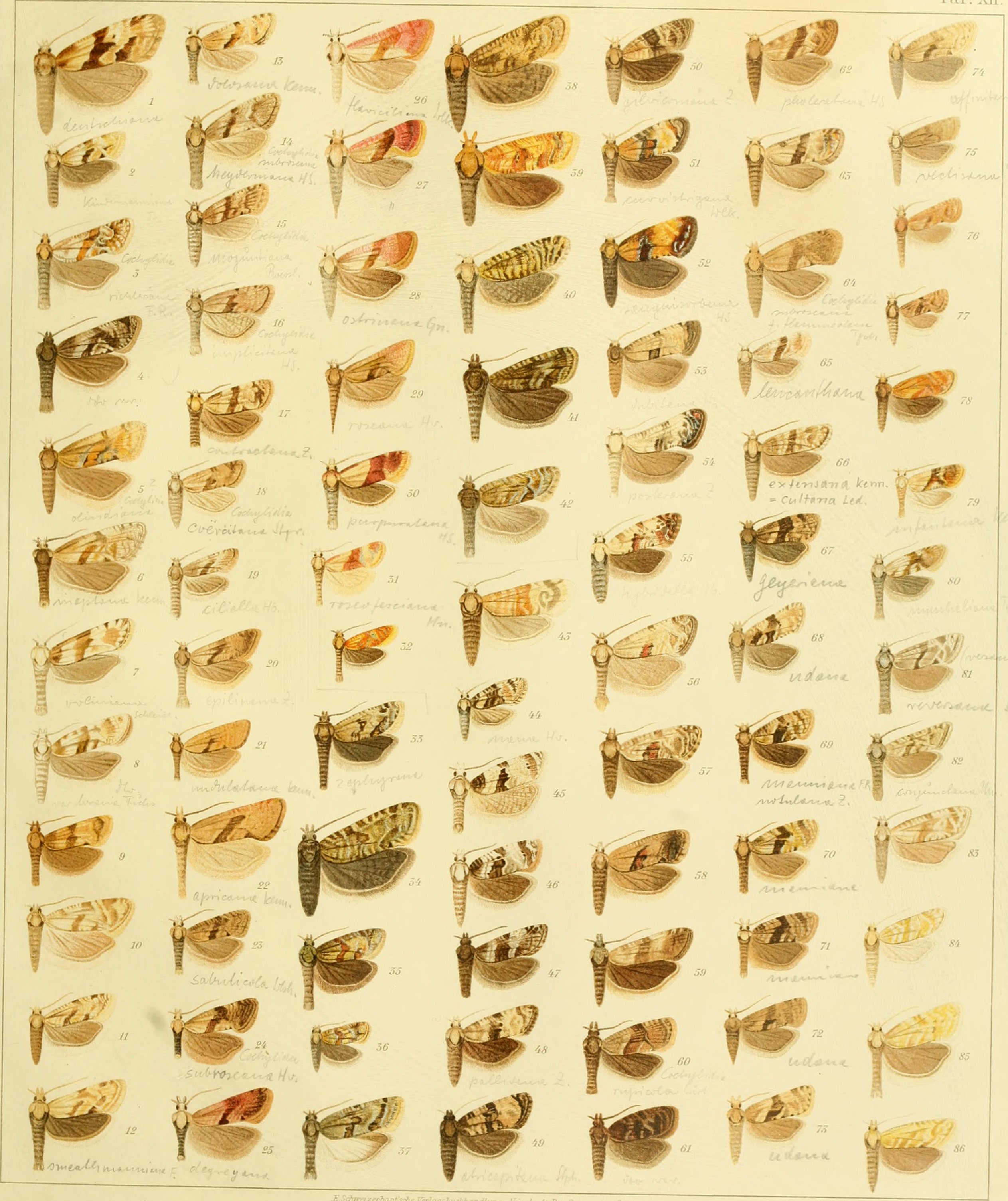
- in Kennel Die palaearktischen tortriciden figure 79

Scientific classification
- Domain: Eukaryota
- Kingdom: Animalia
- Phylum: Arthropoda
- Class: Insecta
- Order: Lepidoptera
- Family: Tortricidae
- Genus: Diceratura
- Species: D. infantana

Binomial name
- Diceratura infantana (Kennel, 1899)

Synonyms
- Cochylis infantana Kennel, 1899; Phalonia puellana Walsingham, 1903

= Diceratura infantana =

Species of moth

Diceratura infantana is a species of moth of the family Tortricidae. It is found in France, Portugal, Spain, Morocco and Algeria.

The wingspan is 9–11 mm. Adults are on wing from April to July.
