= Prochlidonia ochromixtana =

Scientific classification
- Kingdom: Animalia
- Phylum: Arthropoda
- Class: Insecta
- Order: Lepidoptera
- Family: Tortricidae
- Genus: Prochlidonia
- Species: P. ochromixtana

Binomial name
- Prochlidonia ochromixtana (Kennel, 1913)

Synonyms
- Euxanthis ochromixtana Kennel, 1913

Species of moth

Prochlidonia ochromixtana is a species of moth of the family Tortricidae. It is found in Turkey.
