= Planaltinella bahia =

Scientific classification
- Kingdom: Animalia
- Phylum: Arthropoda
- Clade: Pancrustacea
- Class: Insecta
- Order: Lepidoptera
- Family: Tortricidae
- Genus: Planaltinella
- Species: P. bahia

Binomial name
- Planaltinella bahia Razowski & Becker, 2002

Species of moth

Planaltinella bahia is a species of moth of the family Tortricidae. It is found in Bahia, Brazil.

The wingspan is about 22 mm for males and 27 mm for females.
