= Coristaca =

Scientific classification
- Kingdom: Animalia
- Phylum: Arthropoda
- Class: Insecta
- Order: Lepidoptera
- Family: Tortricidae
- Tribe: Cochylini
- Genus: Coristaca; Razowski, 1992
- Species: C. capsularia

Binomial name
- Coristaca capsularia Razowski, 1992

Genus of moths

Coristaca is a monotypic genus of tortrix moths. Its sole species, Coristaca capsularia, is found in Costa Rica.

The wingspan is about 13 mm.
