= Phtheochroides clandestina =

Scientific classification
- Kingdom: Animalia
- Phylum: Arthropoda
- Class: Insecta
- Order: Lepidoptera
- Family: Tortricidae
- Genus: Phtheochroides
- Species: P. clandestina

Binomial name
- Phtheochroides clandestina Razowski, 1968

Synonyms
- Phtheochroides vulneratana Obraztsov, 1943 (nec. Zetterstedt, 1840)

Species of moth

Phtheochroides clandestina is a species of moth of the family Tortricidae. It is found in the Pamir Mountains of Central Asia, in Japan and the Kuril Islands.
