= Parirazona bomana =

Scientific classification
- Kingdom: Animalia
- Phylum: Arthropoda
- Clade: Pancrustacea
- Class: Insecta
- Order: Lepidoptera
- Family: Tortricidae
- Genus: Parirazona
- Species: P. bomana

Binomial name
- Parirazona bomana Razowski & Becker, 2007

Species of moth

Parirazona bomana is a species of moth of the family Tortricidae. It is found in Santa Catarina, Brazil.

The wingspan is about 15 mm small.

== Etymology ==
The species name refers Bom Jardim da Serra.
