= Monoceratuncus eriodens =

Scientific classification
- Kingdom: Animalia
- Phylum: Arthropoda
- Class: Insecta
- Order: Lepidoptera
- Family: Tortricidae
- Genus: Monoceratuncus
- Species: M. eriodens

Binomial name
- Monoceratuncus eriodens (Razowski, 1986)

Synonyms
- Ceratuncus eriodens Razowski, 1986

Species of moth

Monoceratuncus eriodens is a species of moth of the family Tortricidae. It is found in Tabasco, Mexico.
