= Ceratoxanthis externana =

Scientific classification
- Domain: Eukaryota
- Kingdom: Animalia
- Phylum: Arthropoda
- Class: Insecta
- Order: Lepidoptera
- Family: Tortricidae
- Genus: Ceratoxanthis
- Species: C. externana

Binomial name
- Ceratoxanthis externana (Eversmann, 1844)

Synonyms
- Tortrix externana Eversmann, 1844

Species of moth

Ceratoxanthis externana is a species of moth of the family Tortricidae. It is found in Russia (the southern Ural, Caucasus) and Turkmenistan.

The wingspan is 15–19 mm. Adults have been recorded on wing from June to July.
