= Ceratoxanthis iberica =

Scientific classification
- Domain: Eukaryota
- Kingdom: Animalia
- Phylum: Arthropoda
- Class: Insecta
- Order: Lepidoptera
- Family: Tortricidae
- Genus: Ceratoxanthis
- Species: C. iberica

Binomial name
- Ceratoxanthis iberica Baixeras, 1992

Species of moth

Ceratoxanthis iberica is a species of moth of the family Tortricidae. It is found in Spain, where it has been recorded from the Iberian Mountains.

The wingspan is about 20 mm. The ground colour of the forewings is ferruginous yellowish. Adults have been recorded on wing from June to July.
