= Eupinivora rufofascia =

Scientific classification
- Kingdom: Animalia
- Phylum: Arthropoda
- Clade: Pancrustacea
- Class: Insecta
- Order: Lepidoptera
- Family: Tortricidae
- Genus: Eupinivora
- Species: E. rufofascia

Binomial name
- Eupinivora rufofascia J.W. Brown, 2013

Species of moth

Eupinivora rufofascia is a species of moth of the family Tortricidae. It is found in the mountains of Durango in Mexico.

The length of the forewings is 9–10.5 mm for males and 10.5 mm for females.
