= Spinipogon spiniferus =

Scientific classification
- Kingdom: Animalia
- Phylum: Arthropoda
- Class: Insecta
- Order: Lepidoptera
- Family: Tortricidae
- Genus: Spinipogon
- Species: S. spiniferus

Binomial name
- Spinipogon spiniferus Razowski, 1967

Species of moth

Spinipogon spiniferus is a species of moth of the family Tortricidae. It is found in Brazil (Minas Gerais, Paraná, Santarem).
