= Rudenia immanis =

Scientific classification
- Kingdom: Animalia
- Phylum: Arthropoda
- Class: Insecta
- Order: Lepidoptera
- Family: Tortricidae
- Genus: Rudenia
- Species: R. immanis

Binomial name
- Rudenia immanis Razowski, 1994

Species of moth

Rudenia immanis is a species of moth of the family Tortricidae. It is found in Baja California, Mexico.
