= Deltophalonia sucuma =

Scientific classification
- Kingdom: Animalia
- Phylum: Arthropoda
- Clade: Pancrustacea
- Class: Insecta
- Order: Lepidoptera
- Family: Tortricidae
- Genus: Deltophalonia
- Species: D. sucuma

Binomial name
- Deltophalonia sucuma Razowski & Becker, 2010

Species of moth

Deltophalonia sucuma is a species of moth of the family Tortricidae. It is found in Sucumbíos Province, Ecuador.
