= Anielia =

Scientific classification
- Kingdom: Animalia
- Phylum: Arthropoda
- Clade: Pancrustacea
- Class: Insecta
- Order: Lepidoptera
- Family: Tortricidae
- Tribe: Cochylini
- Genus: Anielia; Razowski & Becker, 1983

Genus of tortrix moths

Anielia is a genus of moths belonging to the family Tortricidae.

== Species ==
- Anielia paranica Razowski & Becker, 1983

== See also ==
- List of Tortricidae genera
