= Cochylidichnium amulanum =

Scientific classification
- Kingdom: Animalia
- Phylum: Arthropoda
- Class: Insecta
- Order: Lepidoptera
- Family: Tortricidae
- Genus: Cochylidichnium
- Species: C. amulanum

Binomial name
- Cochylidichnium amulanum Razowski, 1986

Species of moth

Cochylidichnium amulanum is a species of moth of the family Tortricidae. It is found in Guerrero, Mexico.
