= Amallectis devincta =

Scientific classification
- Kingdom: Animalia
- Phylum: Arthropoda
- Class: Insecta
- Order: Lepidoptera
- Family: Tortricidae
- Genus: Amallectis
- Species: A. devincta

Binomial name
- Amallectis devincta Meyrick, 1917

Species of moth

Amallectis devincta is a species of moth of the family Tortricidae. It is found in Peru.
