= Combosclera cingens =

Scientific classification
- Kingdom: Animalia
- Phylum: Arthropoda
- Class: Insecta
- Order: Lepidoptera
- Family: Tortricidae
- Genus: Combosclera
- Species: C. cingens

Binomial name
- Combosclera cingens Razowski, 1999

Species of moth

Combosclera cingens is a species of moth of the family Tortricidae. It is found in Jalisco, Mexico.
