= Planaltinella chapadana =

Scientific classification
- Kingdom: Animalia
- Phylum: Arthropoda
- Clade: Pancrustacea
- Class: Insecta
- Order: Lepidoptera
- Family: Tortricidae
- Genus: Planaltinella
- Species: P. chapadana

Binomial name
- Planaltinella chapadana Razowski & Becker, 2007

Species of moth

Planaltinella chapadana is a species of moth of the family Tortricidae. It is found in Minas Gerais, Brazil.

The wingspan is 15–26 mm.

== Etymology ==
The specific name refers to Chapada, the type locality.
