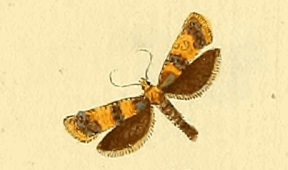

Scientific classification
- Domain: Eukaryota
- Kingdom: Animalia
- Phylum: Arthropoda
- Class: Insecta
- Order: Lepidoptera
- Family: Tortricidae
- Genus: Commophila
- Species: C. aeneana

Binomial name
- Commophila aeneana (Hubner, [1799-1800])

Synonyms
- Tortrix aeneana Hubner, [1799-1800]

= Commophila aeneana =

Species of moth

Commophila aeneana, the orange conch, is a species of moth of the family Tortricidae. It is found in Great Britain, France, Belgium, Luxembourg, the Netherlands, Germany, Austria, Switzerland, Italy and Romania.

The wingspan is 15–19 mm (0.59–0.75 in). Adults are on wing from May to June in one generation per year.

The larvae feed on Senecio jacobaea, Senecio paludosus and Picris hieracioides. They feed on the roots of their host plant. Larvae can be found from September throughout the winter. The species hibernates in the larval stage.
