= Perlorita =

Scientific classification
- Kingdom: Animalia
- Phylum: Arthropoda
- Class: Insecta
- Order: Lepidoptera
- Family: Tortricidae
- Tribe: Cochylini
- Genus: Perlorita; Razowski & Pelz, 2001

Genus of tortrix moths

Perlorita is a genus of moths belonging to the family Tortricidae.

== Species ==
- Perlorita pilumgestatum Razowski & Pelz, 2001

== See also ==
- List of Tortricidae genera
