= Rudenia sepulturae =

Scientific classification
- Kingdom: Animalia
- Phylum: Arthropoda
- Clade: Pancrustacea
- Class: Insecta
- Order: Lepidoptera
- Family: Tortricidae
- Genus: Rudenia
- Species: R. sepulturae

Binomial name
- Rudenia sepulturae Razowski & Becker, 2007

Species of moth

Rudenia sepulturae is a species of moth of the family Tortricidae. It is found in south-eastern Mexico.

The wingspan is about 7.5 mm.

== Etymology ==
The species name refers to La Sepultura, the type locality.
