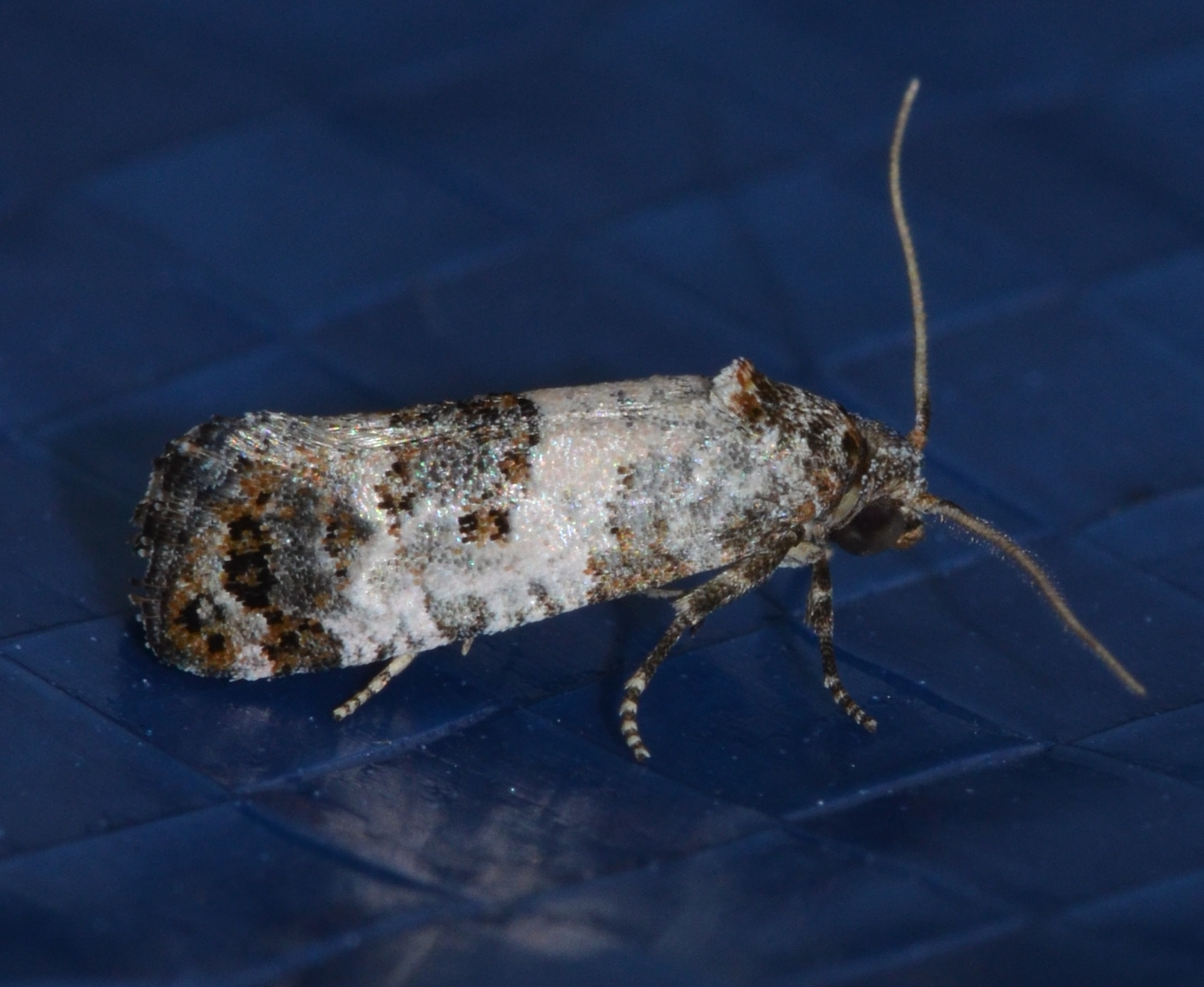
- Rudenia leguminana

Scientific classification
- Kingdom: Animalia
- Phylum: Arthropoda
- Class: Insecta
- Order: Lepidoptera
- Family: Tortricidae
- Tribe: Cochylini
- Genus: Rudenia; Razowski, 1985

= Rudenia =

Genus of tortrix moths

Rudenia is a genus of moths belonging to the family Tortricidae.

== Species ==
- Rudenia immanis Razowski, 1994
- Rudenia leguminana (Busck, 1907)
- Rudenia nigrans Razowski, 1985
- Rudenia paupercula Razowski, 1985
- Rudenia sepulturae Razowski & Becker, 2007

== See also ==
- List of Tortricidae genera
