= Tenoa =

Scientific classification
- Kingdom: Animalia
- Phylum: Arthropoda
- Class: Insecta
- Order: Lepidoptera
- Family: Tortricidae
- Subfamily: Tortricinae
- Tribe: Cochylini
- Genus: Tenoa; Razowski, 1994
- Species: T. curicoana

Binomial name
- Tenoa curicoana Razowski, 1994

Genus of moths

Tenoa is a genus of moths belonging to the subfamily Tortricinae of the family Tortricidae. Its only species is Tenoa curicoana. It is found in Chile.

== See also ==
- List of Tortricidae genera
