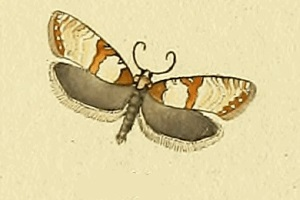
- Prochlidonia amiantana

Scientific classification
- Kingdom: Animalia
- Phylum: Arthropoda
- Clade: Pancrustacea
- Class: Insecta
- Order: Lepidoptera
- Family: Tortricidae
- Tribe: Cochylini
- Genus: Prochlidonia; Razowski, 1960

= Prochlidonia =

Genus of tortrix moths

Prochlidonia is a genus of moths belonging to the family Tortricidae.

== Species ==
- Prochlidonia amiantana (Hubner, [1796-1799])
- Prochlidonia ochromixtana (Kennel, 1913)

== See also ==
- List of Tortricidae genera
