= Chloanohieris =

Scientific classification
- Domain: Eukaryota
- Kingdom: Animalia
- Phylum: Arthropoda
- Class: Insecta
- Order: Lepidoptera
- Family: Tortricidae
- Tribe: Cochylini
- Genus: Chloanohieris; Diakonoff, 1989

Genus of tortrix moths

Chloanohieris is a genus of moths belonging to the family Tortricidae.

== Species ==
- Chloanohieris comastes Diakonoff, 1989

== See also ==
- List of Tortricidae genera
