= Parirazona caracae =

Scientific classification
- Kingdom: Animalia
- Phylum: Arthropoda
- Clade: Pancrustacea
- Class: Insecta
- Order: Lepidoptera
- Family: Tortricidae
- Genus: Parirazona
- Species: P. caracae

Binomial name
- Parirazona caracae Razowski & Becker, 2007

Species of moth

Parirazona caracae is a species of moth of the family Tortricidae. It is found in Minas Gerais, Brazil.

== Etymology ==
The species name refers to the type locality, Caraca.
