= Spinipogon trivius =

Scientific classification
- Kingdom: Animalia
- Phylum: Arthropoda
- Class: Insecta
- Order: Lepidoptera
- Family: Tortricidae
- Genus: Spinipogon
- Species: S. trivius

Binomial name
- Spinipogon trivius Razowski, 1967

Species of moth

Spinipogon trivius is a species of moth of the family Tortricidae. It is found in Paraná, Brazil.
