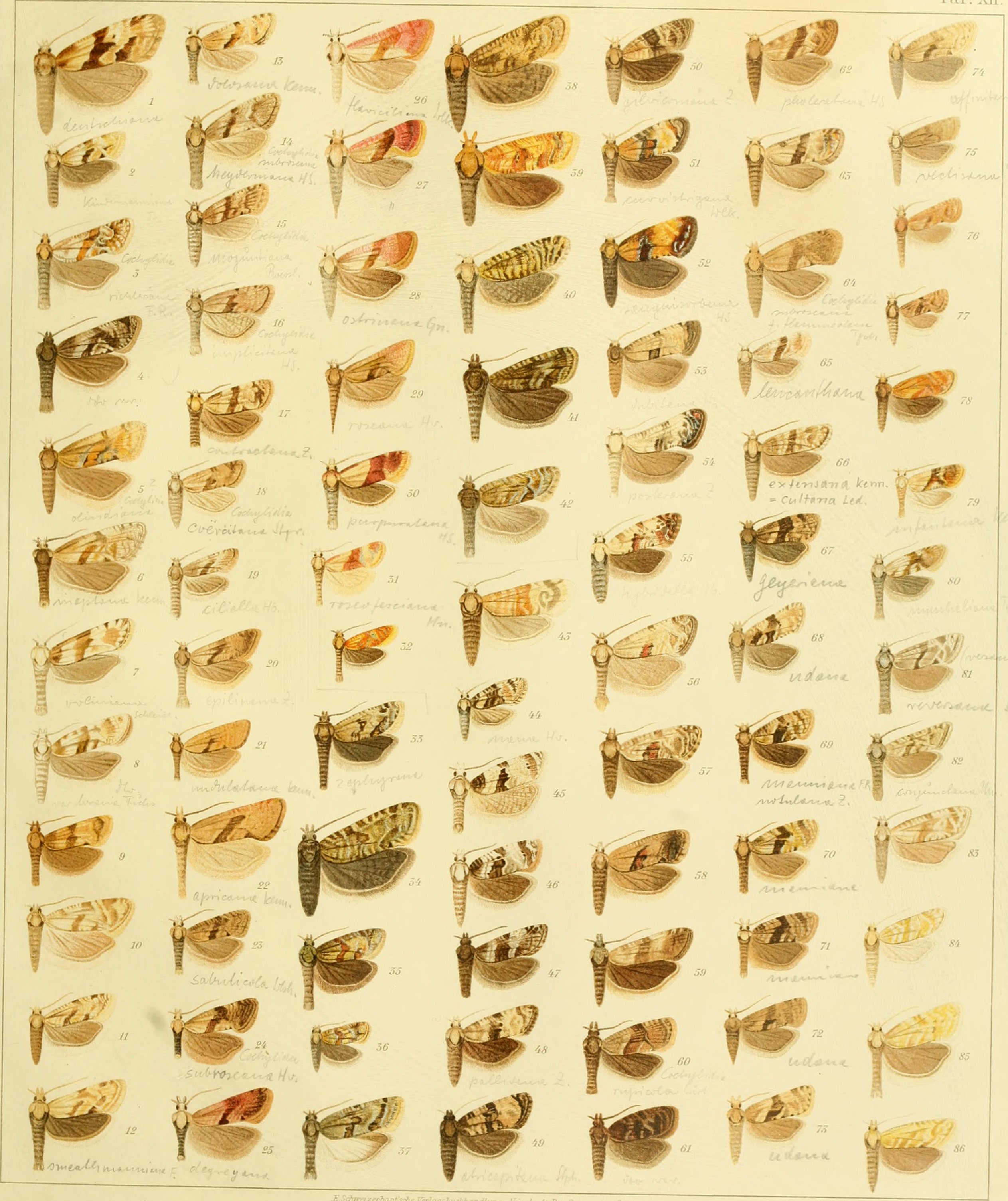
- in Kennel Die palaearktischen tortriciden figure 28 female, 30 male

Scientific classification
- Kingdom: Animalia
- Phylum: Arthropoda
- Class: Insecta
- Order: Lepidoptera
- Family: Tortricidae
- Genus: Diceratura
- Species: D. ostrinana

Binomial name
- Diceratura ostrinana (Guenée, 1845)

Synonyms
- Conchylis ostrinana Guenée, 1845; Tortrix (Cochylis) purpuratana Herrich-Schäffer, 1847; Tortrix (Cochylis) purpuratana Herrich-Schäffer, 1851

= Diceratura ostrinana =

Species of moth

Diceratura ostrinana is a species of moth of the family Tortricidae. It is found from Algeria and the Iberian Peninsula to Hungary, Albania and the Crimea. It is also found in Asia Minor, Lebanon, Transcaucasia, Siberia and Iran.

The wingspan is 8–13 mm. Adults are on wing from April to June and again from July to August.

The larvae feed on the flowers of Chondrilla juncea and Dipsacus silvestris.
