= Mimeugnosta =

Scientific classification
- Kingdom: Animalia
- Phylum: Arthropoda
- Clade: Pancrustacea
- Class: Insecta
- Order: Lepidoptera
- Family: Tortricidae
- Tribe: Cochylini
- Genus: Mimeugnosta; Razowski, 1986

Genus of tortrix moths

Mimeugnosta is a genus of moths belonging to the family Tortricidae.

== Species ==
- Mimeugnosta arta Razowski & Becker, 1986
- Mimeugnosta chascax Razowski, 1994
- Mimeugnosta credibilis Razowski & Becker, 2002
- Mimeugnosta enopla Razowski & Becker, 1986
- Mimeugnosta particeps Razowski, 1986

== See also ==
- List of Tortricidae genera
