= Cirrothaumatia tornocarpa =

Scientific classification
- Kingdom: Animalia
- Phylum: Arthropoda
- Class: Insecta
- Order: Lepidoptera
- Family: Tortricidae
- Genus: Cirrothaumatia
- Species: C. tornocarpa

Binomial name
- Cirrothaumatia tornocarpa (Meyrick, 1932)

Synonyms
- Phtheochroa tornocarpa Meyrick, 1932

Species of moth

Cirrothaumatia tornocarpa is a species of moth of the family Tortricidae. It is found in Panama.
