= Monoceratuncus =

Scientific classification
- Kingdom: Animalia
- Phylum: Arthropoda
- Class: Insecta
- Order: Lepidoptera
- Family: Tortricidae
- Tribe: Cochylini
- Genus: Monoceratuncus; Razowski, 1992

Synonyms
- Ceratuncus Razowski, 1986 (preocc. Petersen, 1957)

Genus of tortrix moths

Monoceratuncus is a genus of moths belonging to the family Tortricidae.

== Species ==
- Monoceratuncus autolytus (Razowski, 1986)
- Monoceratuncus conviva (Razowski, 1990)
- Monoceratuncus cristatus (Razowski & Becker, 1986)
- Monoceratuncus cryphalus Razowski, 1993
- Monoceratuncus eriodens (Razowski, 1986)
- Monoceratuncus lugens (Razowski & Becker, 1986)
- Monoceratuncus peltatus Razowski & Becker, 1993
- Monoceratuncus tantulus (Razowski & Becker, 1986)

== See also ==
- List of Tortricidae genera
