= Monoceratuncus peltatus =

Scientific classification
- Kingdom: Animalia
- Phylum: Arthropoda
- Clade: Pancrustacea
- Class: Insecta
- Order: Lepidoptera
- Family: Tortricidae
- Genus: Monoceratuncus
- Species: M. peltatus

Binomial name
- Monoceratuncus peltatus Razowski & Becker, 1993

Species of moth

Monoceratuncus peltatus is a species of moth of the family Tortricidae. It is found in Guerrero, Mexico.
