= Diceratura amaranthica =

Scientific classification
- Kingdom: Animalia
- Phylum: Arthropoda
- Class: Insecta
- Order: Lepidoptera
- Family: Tortricidae
- Genus: Diceratura
- Species: D. amaranthica

Binomial name
- Diceratura amaranthica Razowski, 1963

Species of moth

Diceratura amaranthica is a species of moth of the family Tortricidae. It is found in France and Spain and on Corsica.

The wingspan is 9–12 mm. Adults are on wing from May to June and in September.
