= Diceratura diceratops =

Scientific classification
- Kingdom: Animalia
- Phylum: Arthropoda
- Class: Insecta
- Order: Lepidoptera
- Family: Tortricidae
- Genus: Diceratura
- Species: D. diceratops

Binomial name
- Diceratura diceratops Razowski, 1967

Species of moth

Diceratura diceratops is a species of moth from the Tortricidae family. It is found in north-eastern Afghanistan.
