= Parirazona =

Scientific classification
- Kingdom: Animalia
- Phylum: Arthropoda
- Class: Insecta
- Order: Lepidoptera
- Family: Tortricidae
- Tribe: Cochylini
- Genus: Parirazona; Razowski, 1984

Genus of tortrix moths

Parirazona is a genus of moths belonging to the family Tortricidae.

== Species ==
- Parirazona bomana Razowski & Becker, 2007
- Parirazona brusqueana Razowski & Becker, 1993
- Parirazona caracae Razowski & Becker, 2007
- Parirazona dolorosa (Meyrick, 1932)
- Parirazona illota Razowski & Becker, 1993
- Parirazona lagoana Razowski & Becker, 1993
- Parirazona penthinana (Razowski, 1967)
- Parirazona serena (Clarke, 1968)
- Parirazona sobrina Razowski & Becker, 1993

== See also ==
- List of Tortricidae genera
