= Hypostromatia versicolorana =

Scientific classification
- Kingdom: Animalia
- Phylum: Arthropoda
- Clade: Pancrustacea
- Class: Insecta
- Order: Lepidoptera
- Family: Tortricidae
- Genus: Hypostromatia
- Species: H. versicolorana

Binomial name
- Hypostromatia versicolorana Zeller, 1866

Species of moth

Hypostromatia versicolorana is a species of moth of the family Tortricidae. Found in Colombia.
