= Cartagogena =

Scientific classification
- Kingdom: Animalia
- Phylum: Arthropoda
- Class: Insecta
- Order: Lepidoptera
- Family: Tortricidae
- Tribe: Cochylini
- Genus: Cartagogena; Razowski, 1992

Genus of tortrix moths

Cartagogena is a genus of moths belonging to the family Tortricidae.

== Species ==
- Cartagogena februa Razowski, 1992
- Cartagogena ferruminata Razowski, 1992
- Cartagogena filtrata Razowski, 1992

== See also ==
- List of Tortricidae genera
