= Deltophalonia huanuci =

Scientific classification
- Domain: Eukaryota
- Kingdom: Animalia
- Phylum: Arthropoda
- Class: Insecta
- Order: Lepidoptera
- Family: Tortricidae
- Genus: Deltophalonia
- Species: D. huanuci

Binomial name
- Deltophalonia huanuci Razowski & Wojtusiak, 2010

Species of moth

Deltophalonia huanuci is a species of moth of the family Tortricidae. It is found in Peru.

The wingspan is 19–22 mm.
