= Banhadoa luculenta =

Scientific classification
- Kingdom: Animalia
- Phylum: Arthropoda
- Clade: Pancrustacea
- Class: Insecta
- Order: Lepidoptera
- Family: Tortricidae
- Genus: Banhadoa
- Species: B. luculenta

Binomial name
- Banhadoa luculenta Razowski & Becker, 1983

Species of moth

Banhadoa luculenta is a species of moth of the family Tortricidae. It is found in Paraná, Brazil.
