= Aphalonia monstrata =

Scientific classification
- Kingdom: Animalia
- Phylum: Arthropoda
- Class: Insecta
- Order: Lepidoptera
- Family: Tortricidae
- Genus: Aphalonia
- Species: A. monstrata

Binomial name
- Aphalonia monstrata Razowski, 1984

Species of moth

Aphalonia monstrata is a species of moth of the family Tortricidae. It is found in Peru.
