= Deltophalonia obscura =

Scientific classification
- Kingdom: Animalia
- Phylum: Arthropoda
- Clade: Pancrustacea
- Class: Insecta
- Order: Lepidoptera
- Family: Tortricidae
- Genus: Deltophalonia
- Species: D. obscura

Binomial name
- Deltophalonia obscura Razowski & Wojtusiak, 2008

Species of moth

Deltophalonia obscura is a species of moth of the family Tortricidae. It is found in Bolívar Province, Ecuador.

The wingspan is about 21 mm (0.83 in).
