= Diceratura rhodograpta =

Scientific classification
- Kingdom: Animalia
- Phylum: Arthropoda
- Class: Insecta
- Order: Lepidoptera
- Family: Tortricidae
- Genus: Diceratura
- Species: D. rhodograpta

Binomial name
- Diceratura rhodograpta Djakonov, 1929

Species of moth

Diceratura rhodograpta is a species of moth of the family Tortricidae. It is found on Sardinia and in France, Italy, North Macedonia, Ukraine, the Transcaucasus, Asia Minor and northern Syria.

The wingspan is 8–10 mm. Adults are on wing from July to August.
