= Juxtolena =

Scientific classification
- Kingdom: Animalia
- Phylum: Arthropoda
- Clade: Pancrustacea
- Class: Insecta
- Order: Lepidoptera
- Family: Tortricidae
- Tribe: Cochylini
- Genus: Juxtolena; Razowski & Becker, 1993

Genus of tortrix moths

Juxtolena is a genus of moths belonging to the family Tortricidae.

== Species ==
- Juxtolena omphalia Razowski & Becker, 1993
- Juxtolena oncodina Razowski & Becker, 1994

== See also ==
- List of Tortricidae genera

== Bibliography ==
- Razowski, J., 2011: Diagnoses and remarks on genera of Tortricidae, 2: Cochylini (Lepidoptera: Tortricidae). Shilap Revista de Lepidopterologia 39 (156): 397–414.
- Razowski & Becker, 1993. Revta lepid. 21 (84) : 235.
