= Ceratoxanthis =

Scientific classification
- Kingdom: Animalia
- Phylum: Arthropoda
- Class: Insecta
- Order: Lepidoptera
- Family: Tortricidae
- Tribe: Cochylini
- Genus: Ceratoxanthis; Razowski, 1960

Genus of tortrix moths

Ceratoxanthis is a genus of moths belonging to the family Tortricidae.

== Species ==
- Ceratoxanthis adriatica Elsner & Jaro, 2003
- Ceratoxanthis argentomixtana (Staudinger, 1871)
- Ceratoxanthis externana (Eversmann, 1844)
- Ceratoxanthis iberica Baixeras, 1992
- Ceratoxanthis rakosyella Wieser & Huemer, 2000
- Ceratoxanthis saratovica Trematerra, 2010

== See also ==
- List of Tortricidae genera
