= Aethesoides columbiana =

Scientific classification
- Kingdom: Animalia
- Phylum: Arthropoda
- Class: Insecta
- Order: Lepidoptera
- Family: Tortricidae
- Genus: Aethesoides
- Species: A. columbiana

Binomial name
- Aethesoides columbiana Razowski, 1967

Species of moth

Aethesoides columbiana is a species of moth of the family Tortricidae. It is found in Colombia.
