= Spinipogon studiosus =

Scientific classification
- Kingdom: Animalia
- Phylum: Arthropoda
- Clade: Pancrustacea
- Class: Insecta
- Order: Lepidoptera
- Family: Tortricidae
- Genus: Spinipogon
- Species: S. studiosus

Binomial name
- Spinipogon studiosus Razowski & Becker, 1993

Species of moth

Spinipogon studiosus is a species of moth of the family Tortricidae. It is found in Guerrero, Mexico.
