= Planaltinella psephena =

Scientific classification
- Kingdom: Animalia
- Phylum: Arthropoda
- Clade: Pancrustacea
- Class: Insecta
- Order: Lepidoptera
- Family: Tortricidae
- Genus: Planaltinella
- Species: P. psephena

Binomial name
- Planaltinella psephena Razowski & Becker, 2007

Species of moth

Planaltinella psephena is a species of moth of the family Tortricidae. It is found in Minas Gerais, Brazil.

The wingspan is about 10.5 mm.
