= Spinipogon misahualli =

Scientific classification
- Kingdom: Animalia
- Phylum: Arthropoda
- Clade: Pancrustacea
- Class: Insecta
- Order: Lepidoptera
- Family: Tortricidae
- Genus: Spinipogon
- Species: S. misahualli

Binomial name
- Spinipogon misahualli Razowski & Becker, 2002

Species of moth

Spinipogon misahualli is a species of moth of the family Tortricidae. It is found in Napo Province, Ecuador.

The wingspan is about 12 mm.
