= Phtheochroides apicana =

Scientific classification
- Domain: Eukaryota
- Kingdom: Animalia
- Phylum: Arthropoda
- Class: Insecta
- Order: Lepidoptera
- Family: Tortricidae
- Genus: Phtheochroides
- Species: P. apicana

Binomial name
- Phtheochroides apicana (Walsingham, 1900)

Synonyms
- Pharmacis apicana Walsingham, 1900

Species of moth

Phtheochroides apicana is a species of moth of the family Tortricidae. It is found in Japan (Hokkaido to Kyushu) and the Kuril Islands. The habitat consists of fir-yew-broad-leaved forests.
