= Lincicochylis argentifusa =

Scientific classification
- Kingdom: Animalia
- Phylum: Arthropoda
- Class: Insecta
- Order: Lepidoptera
- Family: Tortricidae
- Genus: Lincicochylis
- Species: L. argentifusa

Binomial name
- Lincicochylis argentifusa (Walsingham, 1914)

Synonyms
- Phalonia argentifusa Walsingham, 1914

Species of moth

Lincicochylis argentifusa is a species of moth of the family Tortricidae. It is found in Guerrero, Mexico.
