= Spinipogon thes =

Scientific classification
- Kingdom: Animalia
- Phylum: Arthropoda
- Clade: Pancrustacea
- Class: Insecta
- Order: Lepidoptera
- Family: Tortricidae
- Genus: Spinipogon
- Species: S. thes

Binomial name
- Spinipogon thes Razowski & Becker, 1983

Species of moth

Spinipogon thes is a species of moth of the family Tortricidae. It is found in Brazil in the states of Minas Gerais and Santa Catarina.
