= Velhoania =

Scientific classification
- Kingdom: Animalia
- Phylum: Arthropoda
- Clade: Pancrustacea
- Class: Insecta
- Order: Lepidoptera
- Family: Tortricidae
- Tribe: Cochylini
- Genus: Velhoania; Razowski & Becker, 2007
- Species: V. paradoxa

Binomial name
- Velhoania paradoxa Razowski & Becker, 2007

Monotypic genus of tortrix moths

Velhoania is a genus of moths in the family Tortricidae. It consists of only one species, Velhoania paradoxa, which is found in Brazil in the states of Mato Grosso and Rondônia.

The wingspan is about 6 mm.
