= Deltophalonia termasia =

Scientific classification
- Domain: Eukaryota
- Kingdom: Animalia
- Phylum: Arthropoda
- Class: Insecta
- Order: Lepidoptera
- Family: Tortricidae
- Genus: Deltophalonia
- Species: D. termasia

Binomial name
- Deltophalonia termasia Razowski & Wojtusiak, 2009

Species of moth

Deltophalonia termasia is a species of moth of the family Tortricidae. It is found in Ecuador in the provinces of Napo and Tungurahua.

The wingspan is about 26 mm.

== Etymology ==
The species name refers to Las Termas, the type locality.
