= Perlorita pilumgestatum =

Scientific classification
- Kingdom: Animalia
- Phylum: Arthropoda
- Class: Insecta
- Order: Lepidoptera
- Family: Tortricidae
- Genus: Perlorita
- Species: P. pilumgestatum

Binomial name
- Perlorita pilumgestatum Razowski & Pelz, 2001

Species of moth

Perlorita pilumgestatum is a species of moth of the family Tortricidae. It is found in Morona-Santiago Province, Ecuador.
