= Parirazona dolorosa =

Scientific classification
- Domain: Eukaryota
- Kingdom: Animalia
- Phylum: Arthropoda
- Class: Insecta
- Order: Lepidoptera
- Family: Tortricidae
- Genus: Parirazona
- Species: P. dolorosa

Binomial name
- Parirazona dolorosa (Meyrick, 1932)

Synonyms
- Phtheochroa dolorosa Meyrick, 1932

Species of moth

Parirazona dolorosa is a species of moth of the family Tortricidae. It is found in Santa Catarina, Brazil and sometimes in Western Brazil
