= Imashpania =

Scientific classification
- Kingdom: Animalia
- Phylum: Arthropoda
- Class: Insecta
- Order: Lepidoptera
- Family: Tortricidae
- Tribe: Cochylini
- Genus: Imashpania; Razowski & Wojtusiak, 2008
- Species: I. mashpinana

Binomial name
- Imashpania mashpinana Razowski & Wojtusiak, 2008

Genus of moths

Imashpania is a genus of moths in the family Tortricidae. It consists of only one species, Imashpania mashpinana, which is found in Ecuador (Pichincha Province, Carchi Province).

The wingspan is about 22 mm.
