= Thysanphalonia cirrhites =

Scientific classification
- Kingdom: Animalia
- Phylum: Arthropoda
- Clade: Pancrustacea
- Class: Insecta
- Order: Lepidoptera
- Family: Tortricidae
- Genus: Thysanphalonia
- Species: T. cirrhites

Binomial name
- Thysanphalonia cirrhites Razowski & Becker, 1986

Synonyms
- Thysanphalonia cirrithes Razowski, 1994

Species of moth

Thysanphalonia cirrhites is a species of moth of the family Tortricidae. It is found in Veracruz, Mexico.
