= Mimeugnosta particeps =

Scientific classification
- Kingdom: Animalia
- Phylum: Arthropoda
- Class: Insecta
- Order: Lepidoptera
- Family: Tortricidae
- Genus: Mimeugnosta
- Species: M. particeps

Binomial name
- Mimeugnosta particeps Razowski, 1986

Species of moth

Mimeugnosta particeps is a species of moth of the family Tortricidae. It is found in Honduras and on Cuba.
