= Spinipogon =

Scientific classification
- Kingdom: Animalia
- Phylum: Arthropoda
- Class: Insecta
- Order: Lepidoptera
- Family: Tortricidae
- Tribe: Cochylini
- Genus: Spinipogon; Razowski, 1967

Genus of tortrix moths

Spinipogon is a genus of moths belonging to the family Tortricidae.

== Species ==
- Spinipogon atrox Razowski & Becker, 1983
- Spinipogon elaphroterus Razowski & Becker, 1986
- Spinipogon harmozones Razowski, 1986
- Spinipogon ialtris Razowski, 1986
- Spinipogon luxuria Razowski, 1993
- Spinipogon misahualli Razowski & Becker, 2002
- Spinipogon resthavenensis Metzler & Sabourin, 2002
- Spinipogon signata Razowski, 1967
- Spinipogon spiniferus Razowski, 1967
- Spinipogon studiosus Razowski & Becker, 1993
- Spinipogon thes Razowski & Becker, 1983
- Spinipogon trivius Razowski, 1967
- Spinipogon veracruzanus Razowski & Becker, 1986
- Spinipogon virginanus Razowski & Becker, 2007

== See also ==
- List of Tortricidae genera
