= Aphalonia =

Scientific classification
- Kingdom: Animalia
- Phylum: Arthropoda
- Class: Insecta
- Order: Lepidoptera
- Family: Tortricidae
- Subfamily: Tortricinae
- Tribe: Cochylini
- Genus: Aphalonia; Razowski, 1984

Genus of tortrix moths

Aphalonia is a genus of moths belonging to family Tortricidae.

== Species ==
- Aphalonia monstrata Razowski, 1984
- Aphalonia praeposita (Meyrick, 1917)

== See also ==
- List of Tortricidae genera
