= Eupinivora =

Scientific classification
- Kingdom: Animalia
- Phylum: Arthropoda
- Clade: Pancrustacea
- Class: Insecta
- Order: Lepidoptera
- Family: Tortricidae
- Tribe: Cochylini
- Genus: Eupinivora; J.W. Brown, 2013

Genus of moths

Eupinivora is a genus of moths belonging to the family Tortricidae.

== Species ==
- Eupinivora albolineana J.W. Brown, 2013
- Eupinivora angulicosta J.W. Brown, 2013
- Eupinivora hamartopenis (Razowski, 1986)
- Eupinivora ponderosae J.W. Brown, 2013
- Eupinivora rufofascia J.W. Brown, 2013
- Eupinivora thaumantias (Razowski, 1994)
- Eupinivora unicolora J.W. Brown, 2013

== See also ==
- List of Tortricidae genera
