= Aethesoides chalcospila =

Scientific classification
- Kingdom: Animalia
- Phylum: Arthropoda
- Class: Insecta
- Order: Lepidoptera
- Family: Tortricidae
- Genus: Aethesoides
- Species: A. chalcospila

Binomial name
- Aethesoides chalcospila (Meyrick, 1932)

Synonyms
- Phalonia chalcospila Meyrick, 1932

Species of moth

Aethesoides chalcospila is a species of moth of the family Tortricidae. It is found in Costa Rica.
