= Spinipogon luxuria =

Scientific classification
- Kingdom: Animalia
- Phylum: Arthropoda
- Class: Insecta
- Order: Lepidoptera
- Family: Tortricidae
- Genus: Spinipogon
- Species: S. luxuria

Binomial name
- Spinipogon luxuria Razowski, 1993

Species of moth

Spinipogon luxuria is a species of moth of the family Tortricidae. It is found in Peru.
