= Phaniola implicata =

Scientific classification
- Kingdom: Animalia
- Phylum: Arthropoda
- Clade: Pancrustacea
- Class: Insecta
- Order: Lepidoptera
- Family: Tortricidae
- Genus: Phaniola
- Species: P. implicata

Binomial name
- Phaniola implicata Razowski & Becker, 2003

Species of moth

Phaniola implicata is a species of moth of the family Tortricidae. It is found in Bahia, Brazil.
