= Monoceratuncus tantulus =

Scientific classification
- Kingdom: Animalia
- Phylum: Arthropoda
- Clade: Pancrustacea
- Class: Insecta
- Order: Lepidoptera
- Family: Tortricidae
- Genus: Monoceratuncus
- Species: M. tantulus

Binomial name
- Monoceratuncus tantulus (Razowski & Becker, 1986)

Synonyms
- Ceratuncus tantulus Razowski & Becker, 1986

Species of moth

Monoceratuncus tantulus is a species of moth of the family Tortricidae. It is found in Guerrero, Mexico.
