= Eupinivora thaumantias =

Scientific classification
- Kingdom: Animalia
- Phylum: Arthropoda
- Class: Insecta
- Order: Lepidoptera
- Family: Tortricidae
- Genus: Eupinivora
- Species: E. thaumantias

Binomial name
- Eupinivora thaumantias (Razowski, 1994)

Synonyms
- Phtheochroa thaumantias Razowski, 1994

Species of Tortricid moth

Eupinivora thaumantias is a species of moth of the family Tortricidae. It is found in Mexico.

The length of the forewings is 10–10.8 mm for males and 10–11 mm for females.
