= Planaltinella =

Scientific classification
- Kingdom: Animalia
- Phylum: Arthropoda
- Clade: Pancrustacea
- Class: Insecta
- Order: Lepidoptera
- Family: Tortricidae
- Tribe: Cochylini
- Genus: Planaltinella; Razowski & Becker, 1994

Genus of tortrix moths

Planaltinella is a genus of moths belonging to the family Tortricidae.

== Species ==
- Planaltinella bahia Razowski & Becker, 2002
- Planaltinella chapadana Razowski & Becker, 2007
- Planaltinella psephena Razowski & Becker, 2007
- Planaltinella rhatyma Razowski & Becker, 1994

== See also ==
- List of Tortricidae genera
