= Prohysterophora chionopa =

Scientific classification
- Kingdom: Animalia
- Phylum: Arthropoda
- Class: Insecta
- Order: Lepidoptera
- Family: Tortricidae
- Genus: Prohysterophora
- Species: P. chionopa

Binomial name
- Prohysterophora chionopa (Meyrick, 1891)

Synonyms
- Conchylis chionopa Meyrick, 1891; Eulia neftana Lucas, 1943; Prohysterophora neftana

Species of moth

Prohysterophora chionopa is a species of moth of the family Tortricidae. It is found in Algeria and Tunisia.
