= Deltophalonia embrithopa =

Scientific classification
- Kingdom: Animalia
- Phylum: Arthropoda
- Class: Insecta
- Order: Lepidoptera
- Family: Tortricidae
- Genus: Deltophalonia
- Species: D. embrithopa

Binomial name
- Deltophalonia embrithopa (Meyrick, 1927)

Synonyms
- Phalonia embrithopa Meyrick, 1927

Species of moth

Deltophalonia embrithopa is a species of moth of the family Tortricidae. It is found in Colombia.
