= Aprepodoxa =

Scientific classification
- Kingdom: Animalia
- Phylum: Arthropoda
- Class: Insecta
- Order: Lepidoptera
- Family: Tortricidae
- Tribe: Cochylini
- Genus: Aprepodoxa; Meyrick, 1937

Genus of tortrix moths

Aprepodoxa is a genus of moths belonging to the family Tortricidae.

== Species ==
- Aprepodoxa glycitis (Meyrick, 1928)
- Aprepodoxa mimocharis Meyrick in Caradja & Meyrick, 1937

== See also ==
- List of Tortricidae genera
