= Mimeugnosta credibilis =

Scientific classification
- Kingdom: Animalia
- Phylum: Arthropoda
- Clade: Pancrustacea
- Class: Insecta
- Order: Lepidoptera
- Family: Tortricidae
- Genus: Mimeugnosta
- Species: M. credibilis

Binomial name
- Mimeugnosta credibilis Razowski & Becker, 2002

Species of moth

Mimeugnosta credibilis is a species of moth of the family Tortricidae. It is found in Minas Gerais, Brazil.

The wingspan is about 8 mm.
