= Plesiocochylis =

Scientific classification
- Kingdom: Animalia
- Phylum: Arthropoda
- Class: Insecta
- Order: Lepidoptera
- Family: Tortricidae
- Tribe: Cochylini
- Genus: Plesiocochylis; Razowski & Wojtusiak, 2008
- Species: P. gnathosia

Binomial name
- Plesiocochylis gnathosia Razowski & Wojtusiak, 2008

Genus of moths

Plesiocochylis is a genus of moths in the family Tortricidae. It consists of only one species, Plesiocochylis gnathosia, which is found in Ecuador (Pichincha Province).

The wingspan is about 16 mm.
