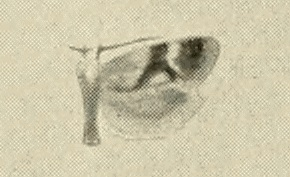

Scientific classification
- Domain: Eukaryota
- Kingdom: Animalia
- Phylum: Arthropoda
- Class: Insecta
- Order: Lepidoptera
- Family: Tortricidae
- Tribe: Cochylini
- Genus: Diceratura; Djakonov, 1929

= Diceratura =

Genus of tortrix moths

Diceratura is a genus of moths belonging to the family Tortricidae.

== Species ==
- Diceratura amaranthica Razowski, 1963
- Diceratura complicana Aarvik, 2010
- Diceratura diceratops Razowski, 1967
- Diceratura infantana (Kennel, 1899)
- Diceratura ostrinana (Guenee, 1845)
- Diceratura porrectana Djakonov, 1929
- Diceratura rhodograpta Djakonov, 1929
- Diceratura roseofasciana (Mann, 1855)
- Diceratura teheranica Razowski, 1970

== See also ==
- List of Tortricidae genera
