= Cartagogena filtrata =

Scientific classification
- Kingdom: Animalia
- Phylum: Arthropoda
- Class: Insecta
- Order: Lepidoptera
- Family: Tortricidae
- Genus: Cartagogena
- Species: C. filtrata

Binomial name
- Cartagogena filtrata Razowski, 1992

Species of moth

Cartagogena filtrata is a species of moth of the family Tortricidae. It is found in Costa Rica.

The wingspan is about 24 mm.
