= Aethesoides hondurasica =

Scientific classification
- Kingdom: Animalia
- Phylum: Arthropoda
- Class: Insecta
- Order: Lepidoptera
- Family: Tortricidae
- Genus: Aethesoides
- Species: A. hondurasica

Binomial name
- Aethesoides hondurasica Razowski, 1986

Synonyms
- Aethesoides hondurassica Razowski, in Heppner, 1995

Species of moth

Aethesoides hondurasica is a species of moth of the family Tortricidae. It is found in Honduras.
