= Juxtolena oncodina =

Scientific classification
- Kingdom: Animalia
- Phylum: Arthropoda
- Class: Insecta
- Order: Lepidoptera
- Family: Tortricidae
- Genus: Juxtolena
- Species: J. oncodina

Binomial name
- Juxtolena oncodina Razowski & Becker, 1994

Species of moth

Juxtolena oncodina is a species of moth of the family Tortricidae. It is found in the Federal District of Brazil.
