= Belemgena phlattotreta =

Scientific classification
- Kingdom: Animalia
- Phylum: Arthropoda
- Clade: Pancrustacea
- Class: Insecta
- Order: Lepidoptera
- Family: Tortricidae
- Genus: Belemgena
- Species: B. phlattotreta

Binomial name
- Belemgena phlattotreta Razowski & Becker, 1994

Species of moth

Belemgena phlattotreta is a species of moth of the family Tortricidae. It is found in Pará, Brazil.
