= Chloanohieris comastes =

Scientific classification
- Kingdom: Animalia
- Phylum: Arthropoda
- Class: Insecta
- Order: Lepidoptera
- Family: Tortricidae
- Genus: Chloanohieris
- Species: C. comastes

Binomial name
- Chloanohieris comastes Diakonoff, 1989

Species of moth

Chloanohieris comastes is a species of moth of the family Tortricidae. It is found on Madagascar.
