= Aprepodoxa mimocharis =

Scientific classification
- Kingdom: Animalia
- Phylum: Arthropoda
- Class: Insecta
- Order: Lepidoptera
- Family: Tortricidae
- Genus: Aprepodoxa
- Species: A. mimocharis

Binomial name
- Aprepodoxa mimocharis Meyrick in Caradja & Meyrick, 1937

Species of moth

Aprepodoxa mimocharis is a species of moth of the family Tortricidae. It is found in Yunnan, China.
