= Cirrothaumatia tornosema =

Scientific classification
- Domain: Eukaryota
- Kingdom: Animalia
- Phylum: Arthropoda
- Class: Insecta
- Order: Lepidoptera
- Family: Tortricidae
- Genus: Cirrothaumatia
- Species: C. tornosema

Binomial name
- Cirrothaumatia tornosema (Clarke, 1968)

Synonyms
- Phalonia tornosema Clarke, 1968

Species of moth

Cirrothaumatia tornosema is a species of moth of the family Tortricidae. It is found in Guatemala.
