= Amallectis =

Scientific classification
- Kingdom: Animalia
- Phylum: Arthropoda
- Class: Insecta
- Order: Lepidoptera
- Family: Tortricidae
- Tribe: Cochylini
- Genus: Amallectis; Meyrick, 1917

Genus of tortrix moths

Amallectis is a genus of moths belonging to the subfamily Tortricinae of the family Tortricidae.

== Species ==
- Amallectis devincta Meyrick, 1917

== See also ==
- List of Tortricidae genera
