= Phaniola (moth) =

Scientific classification
- Kingdom: Animalia
- Phylum: Arthropoda
- Clade: Pancrustacea
- Class: Insecta
- Order: Lepidoptera
- Family: Tortricidae
- Tribe: Cochylini
- Genus: Phaniola; Razowski & Becker, 2003

Genus of tortrix moths

Phaniola is a genus of moths belonging to the family Tortricidae.

== Species ==
- Phaniola caboana Razowski & Becker, 2007
- Phaniola implicata Razowski & Becker, 2003

== See also ==
- List of Tortricidae genera
