= Diceratura porrectana =

Scientific classification
- Domain: Eukaryota
- Kingdom: Animalia
- Phylum: Arthropoda
- Class: Insecta
- Order: Lepidoptera
- Family: Tortricidae
- Genus: Diceratura
- Species: D. porrectana

Binomial name
- Diceratura porrectana Djakonov, 1929

Species of moth

Diceratura porrectana is a species of moth of the family Tortricidae. It is found in Transcaucasia and Golestan Province, Iran.
