= Phaniola caboana =

Scientific classification
- Kingdom: Animalia
- Phylum: Arthropoda
- Clade: Pancrustacea
- Class: Insecta
- Order: Lepidoptera
- Family: Tortricidae
- Genus: Phaniola
- Species: P. caboana

Binomial name
- Phaniola caboana Razowski & Becker, 2007

Species of moth

Phaniola caboana is a species of moth of the family Tortricidae. It is found in Rio de Janeiro, Brazil.

The wingspan is about 7.5 mm.

== Etymology ==
The species name refers to Arraial do Cabo, the type locality.
