= Commophila nevadensis =

Scientific classification
- Kingdom: Animalia
- Phylum: Arthropoda
- Class: Insecta
- Order: Lepidoptera
- Family: Tortricidae
- Genus: Commophila
- Species: C. nevadensis

Binomial name
- Commophila nevadensis Traugott-Olsen, 1990

Species of moth

Commophila nevadensis is a species of moth of the family Tortricidae. It is found in Spain.

The wingspan is about 21 mm. Adults are on wing from July to August.
