= Cirrothaumatia =

Scientific classification
- Kingdom: Animalia
- Phylum: Arthropoda
- Clade: Pancrustacea
- Class: Insecta
- Order: Lepidoptera
- Family: Tortricidae
- Subfamily: Tortricinae
- Tribe: Cochylini
- Genus: Cirrothaumatia; Razowski & Becker, 1986

Genus of tortrix moths

Cirrothaumatia is a genus of moths belonging to the family Tortricidae.

== Species ==
- Cirrothaumatia tornocarpa (Meyrick, 1932)
- Cirrothaumatia tornosema (Clarke, 1968)
- Cirrothaumatia vesta (Clarke, 1968)

== See also ==
- List of Tortricidae genera
