= Spinipogon atrox =

Scientific classification
- Kingdom: Animalia
- Phylum: Arthropoda
- Clade: Pancrustacea
- Class: Insecta
- Order: Lepidoptera
- Family: Tortricidae
- Genus: Spinipogon
- Species: S. atrox

Binomial name
- Spinipogon atrox Razowski & Becker, 1983

Species of moth

Spinipogon atrox is a species of moth of the family Tortricidae. It is found in Brazil in the states of Paraná and Minas Gerais.
