= Planaltinella rhatyma =

Scientific classification
- Kingdom: Animalia
- Phylum: Arthropoda
- Clade: Pancrustacea
- Class: Insecta
- Order: Lepidoptera
- Family: Tortricidae
- Genus: Planaltinella
- Species: P. rhatyma

Binomial name
- Planaltinella rhatyma Razowski & Becker, 1994

Species of moth

Planaltinella rhatyma is a species of moth of the family Tortricidae. It is found in Brazil in the Federal District and the state of Goiás.
