= Aphalonia praeposita =

Scientific classification
- Kingdom: Animalia
- Phylum: Arthropoda
- Class: Insecta
- Order: Lepidoptera
- Family: Tortricidae
- Genus: Aphalonia
- Species: A. praeposita

Binomial name
- Aphalonia praeposita (Meyrick, 1917)

Synonyms
- Phtheochroa praeposita Meyrick, 1917

Species of moth

Aphalonia praeposita is a species of moth of the family Tortricidae. It is found in Colombia.
