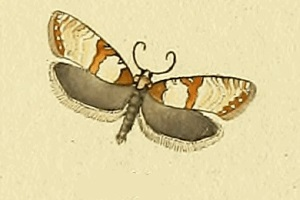

Scientific classification
- Kingdom: Animalia
- Phylum: Arthropoda
- Clade: Pancrustacea
- Class: Insecta
- Order: Lepidoptera
- Family: Tortricidae
- Genus: Prochlidonia
- Species: P. amiantana

Binomial name
- Prochlidonia amiantana (Hubner, [1796-1799])

Synonyms
- Tortrix amiantana Hubner, [1796-1799]

= Prochlidonia amiantana =

Species of moth

Prochlidonia amiantana is a species of moth of the family Tortricidae. It is found in France, Germany, Italy, Austria, the Czech Republic, Slovakia, Poland, Croatia, Slovenia, Albania, Hungary, Romania, North Macedonia and Greece.

The wingspan is 16–19 mm. Adults have been recorded on wing from April to May and again from July to August.
