= Deltophalonia chlidonibrya =

Scientific classification
- Kingdom: Animalia
- Phylum: Arthropoda
- Clade: Pancrustacea
- Class: Insecta
- Order: Lepidoptera
- Family: Tortricidae
- Genus: Deltophalonia
- Species: D. chlidonibrya

Binomial name
- Deltophalonia chlidonibrya Razowski & Becker, 2003

Species of moth

Deltophalonia chlidonibrya is a species of moth of the family Tortricidae. It is found in Ecuador (Morona-Santiago Province, Loja Province) and Colombia.
