= Empedcochylis =

Scientific classification
- Kingdom: Animalia
- Phylum: Arthropoda
- Class: Insecta
- Order: Lepidoptera
- Family: Tortricidae
- Tribe: Cochylini
- Genus: Empedcochylis; Razowski, 1994

Genus of tortrix moths

Empedcochylis is a genus of moths belonging to the subfamily Tortricinae of the family Tortricidae.

== Species ==
- Empedcochylis empeda Razowski & Becker, 1986

== See also ==
- List of Tortricidae genera
