= Aethesoides allodapa =

Scientific classification
- Kingdom: Animalia
- Phylum: Arthropoda
- Class: Insecta
- Order: Lepidoptera
- Family: Tortricidae
- Genus: Aethesoides
- Species: A. allodapa

Binomial name
- Aethesoides allodapa Razowski, 1986

Species of moth

Aethesoides allodapa is a species of moth of the family Tortricidae. It is found in Guerrero, Mexico.
