= Cartagogena ferruminata =

Scientific classification
- Kingdom: Animalia
- Phylum: Arthropoda
- Class: Insecta
- Order: Lepidoptera
- Family: Tortricidae
- Genus: Cartagogena
- Species: C. ferruminata

Binomial name
- Cartagogena ferruminata Razowski, 1992

Species of moth

Cartagogena ferruminata is a species of moth of the family Tortricidae. It is found in Costa Rica.

The wingspan is 23–25 mm.
