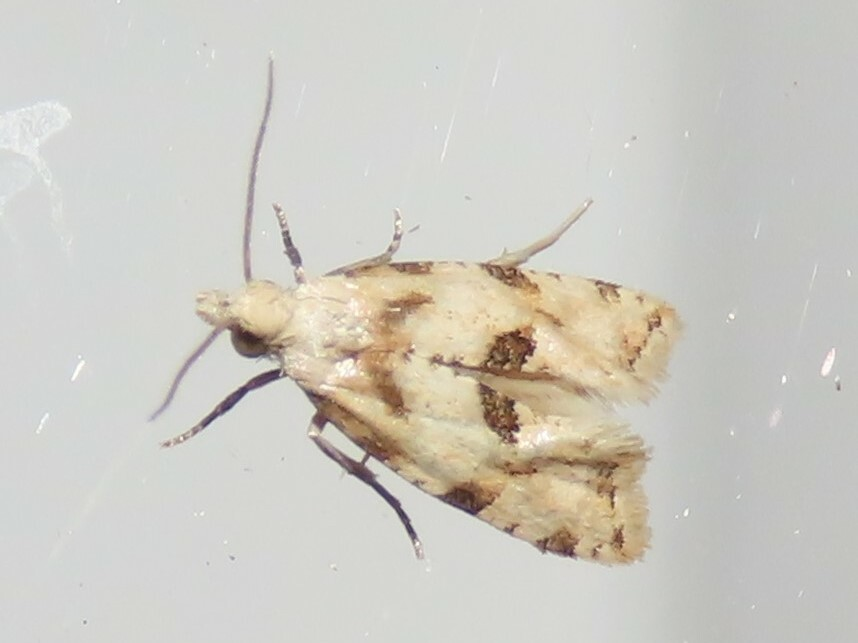

Scientific classification
- Kingdom: Animalia
- Phylum: Arthropoda
- Clade: Pancrustacea
- Class: Insecta
- Order: Lepidoptera
- Family: Tortricidae
- Tribe: Cochylini
- Genus: Aethesoides; Razowski, 1964

= Aethesoides =

Genus of tortrix moths

Aethesoides is a genus of moths belonging to the subfamily Tortricinae of the family Tortricidae.

== Species ==
- Aethesoides allodapa Razowski, 1986
- Aethesoides chalcospila (Meyrick, 1932)
- Aethesoides columbiana Razowski, 1967
- Aethesoides distigmatana (Walsingham, 1897)
- Aethesoides enclitica (Meyrick, 1917)
- Aethesoides hondurasica Razowski, 1986
- Aethesoides inanita Razowski & Becker, 1986
- Aethesoides mexicana Razowski, 1986
- Aethesoides stellans Razowski & Becker, 1994
- Aethesoides timia Razowski & Becker, 1986

== See also ==
- List of Tortricidae genera
