= Juxtolena omphalia =

Scientific classification
- Kingdom: Animalia
- Phylum: Arthropoda
- Clade: Pancrustacea
- Class: Insecta
- Order: Lepidoptera
- Family: Tortricidae
- Genus: Juxtolena
- Species: J. omphalia

Binomial name
- Juxtolena omphalia Razowski & Becker, 1993

Species of moth

Juxtolena omphalia is a species of moth of the family Tortricidae. It is found in Costa Rica.
