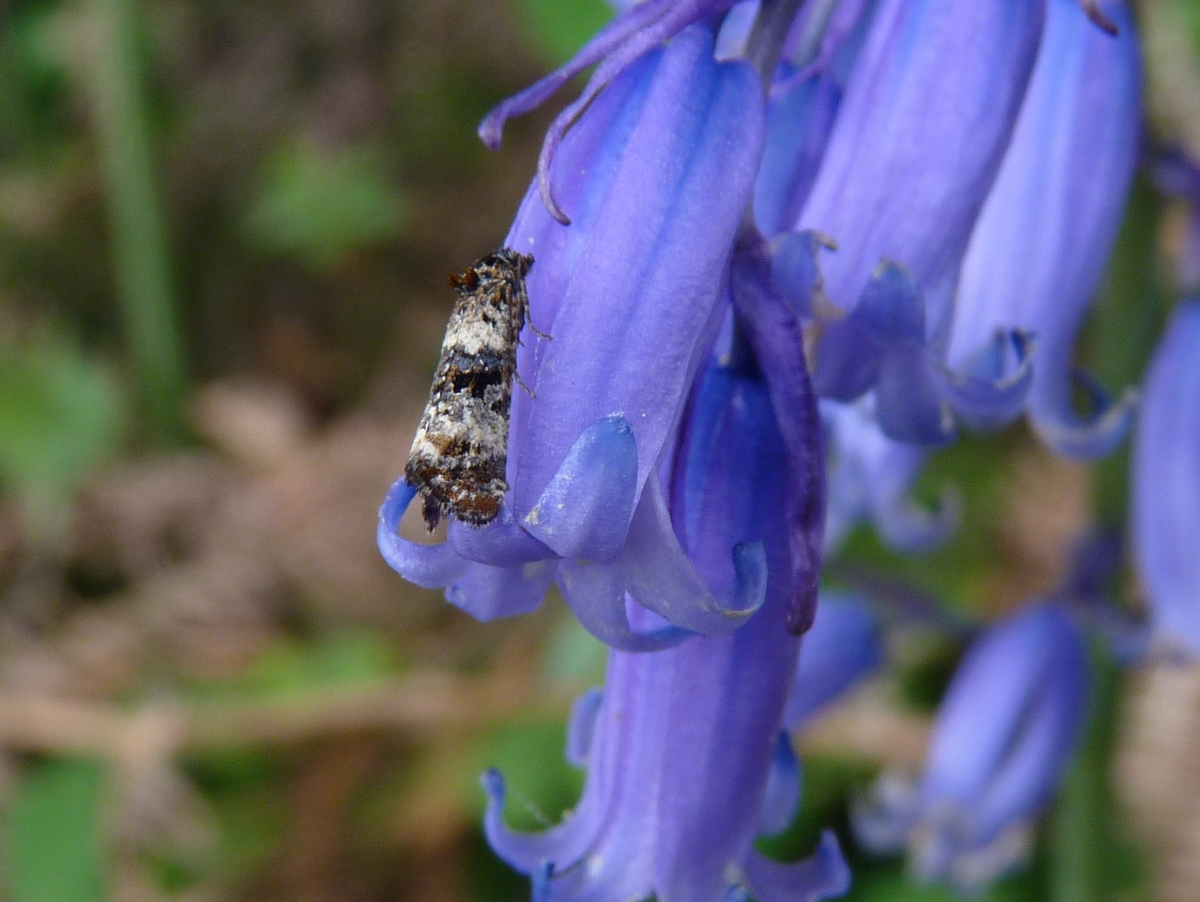

Scientific classification
- Kingdom: Animalia
- Phylum: Arthropoda
- Clade: Pancrustacea
- Class: Insecta
- Order: Lepidoptera
- Family: Tortricidae
- Genus: Hysterophora
- Species: H. maculosana

Binomial name
- Hysterophora maculosana (Haworth, [1811])

Synonyms
- Tortrix maculosana Haworth, [1811]; Conchylis porculana Mann, 1862; Cochylis purgatana Treitschke, 1835

= Hysterophora maculosana =

Bluebell conch

Species of moth

Hysterophora maculosana, the bluebell conch, is a species of moth of the family Tortricidae. It is found from most of Europe, east to the Crimea, Asia Minor and the Palestinian territories. The habitat consists of woodland areas.

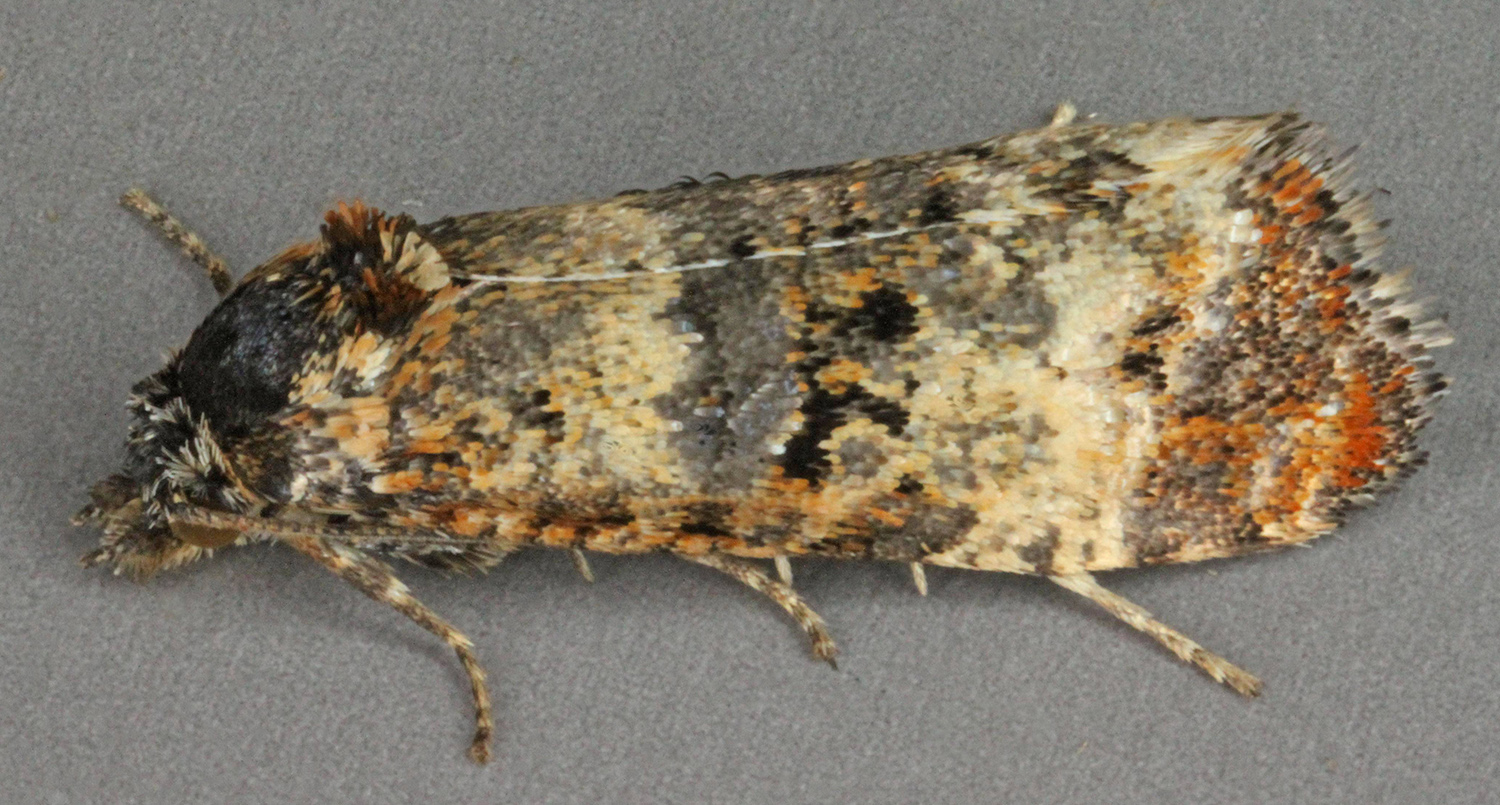

The wingspan is 10–14 mm. Adult males have whitish hindwings, whereas those of the female are dark. Meyrick describes it - Forewings white, more or less strigulated with grey, basal area and broad cloudy direct antemedian fascia dark grey, spotted in disc with black and sometimes ferruginous; a curved stria from tornus not reaching costa, and a subapical fascia dark grey apex and termen streaked with ferruginous. Hindwings in male white, costa, termen, and some anteapical spots dark fuscous, in female wholly dark grey. The larva is white; dorsal, spiracular, and subspiracular lines pale ferruginous; spots pale ferruginous; head pale brown; plate of 2 black. Adults are on wing from April and June.

The larvae feed on the flowers of Chondrilla juncea and within the seedheads Hyacinthoides non-scripta. Larvae have been recorded nearly year round.
