= Parirazona penthinana =

Scientific classification
- Kingdom: Animalia
- Phylum: Arthropoda
- Class: Insecta
- Order: Lepidoptera
- Family: Tortricidae
- Genus: Parirazona
- Species: P. penthinana

Binomial name
- Parirazona penthinana (Razowski, 1967)

Synonyms
- Irazona penthinana Razowski, 1967

Species of moth

Parirazona penthinana is a species of moth of the family Tortricidae. It is found in Rio de Janeiro, Brazil.
