= Gryposcleroma schidia =

Scientific classification
- Kingdom: Animalia
- Phylum: Arthropoda
- Class: Insecta
- Order: Lepidoptera
- Family: Tortricidae
- Genus: Gryposcleroma
- Species: G. schidia

Binomial name
- Gryposcleroma schidia Razowski, 1986

Species of moth

Gryposcleroma schidia is a species of moth of the family Tortricidae. It is found in Nuevo León, Mexico.
