= Ceratoxanthis rakosyella =

Scientific classification
- Kingdom: Animalia
- Phylum: Arthropoda
- Clade: Pancrustacea
- Class: Insecta
- Order: Lepidoptera
- Family: Tortricidae
- Genus: Ceratoxanthis
- Species: C. rakosyella

Binomial name
- Ceratoxanthis rakosyella Wieser & Huemer, 2000

Species of moth

Ceratoxanthis rakosyella is a species of moth of the family Tortricidae. It is found in Romania.

The wingspan is 16–17 mm. Adults have been recorded on wing from May to June.
