= Spinipogon elaphroterus =

Scientific classification
- Kingdom: Animalia
- Phylum: Arthropoda
- Clade: Pancrustacea
- Class: Insecta
- Order: Lepidoptera
- Family: Tortricidae
- Genus: Spinipogon
- Species: S. elaphroterus

Binomial name
- Spinipogon elaphroterus Razowski & Becker, 1986

Species of moth

Spinipogon elaphroterus is a species of moth of the family Tortricidae. It is found in Costa Rica and in Mexico in the states of Tamaulipas and Veracruz.
