= Diceratura teheranica =

Scientific classification
- Kingdom: Animalia
- Phylum: Arthropoda
- Class: Insecta
- Order: Lepidoptera
- Family: Tortricidae
- Genus: Diceratura
- Species: D. teheranica

Binomial name
- Diceratura teheranica Razowski, 1970

Species of moth

Diceratura teheranica is a species of moth of the family Tortricidae. It is found in Darband, Iran.
