= Ceratoxanthis argentomixtana =

Scientific classification
- Domain: Eukaryota
- Kingdom: Animalia
- Phylum: Arthropoda
- Class: Insecta
- Order: Lepidoptera
- Family: Tortricidae
- Genus: Ceratoxanthis
- Species: C. argentomixtana

Binomial name
- Ceratoxanthis argentomixtana (Staudinger, 1871)

Synonyms
- Conchylis argentomixtana Staudinger, 1871

Species of moth

Ceratoxanthis argentomixtana is a species of moth of the family Tortricidae. It is found in southern Russia (Sarepta), northern Syria (Marash) and Turkey.

The wingspan is about 23 mm. Adults have been recorded on wing in June.
