= Eupinivora angulicosta =

Scientific classification
- Kingdom: Animalia
- Phylum: Arthropoda
- Clade: Pancrustacea
- Class: Insecta
- Order: Lepidoptera
- Family: Tortricidae
- Genus: Eupinivora
- Species: E. angulicosta

Binomial name
- Eupinivora angulicosta J.W. Brown, 2013

Species of moth

Eupinivora angulicosta is a species of moth of the family Tortricidae. It is found in Nuevo León, Mexico.

The length of the forewings is about 12 mm.
