= Monoceratuncus cryphalus =

Scientific classification
- Kingdom: Animalia
- Phylum: Arthropoda
- Class: Insecta
- Order: Lepidoptera
- Family: Tortricidae
- Genus: Monoceratuncus
- Species: M. cryphalus

Binomial name
- Monoceratuncus cryphalus Razowski, 1993

Species of moth

Monoceratuncus cryphalus is a species of moth of the family Tortricidae. It is found in Peru.
