= Diceratura complicana =

Scientific classification
- Domain: Eukaryota
- Kingdom: Animalia
- Phylum: Arthropoda
- Class: Insecta
- Order: Lepidoptera
- Family: Tortricidae
- Genus: Diceratura
- Species: D. complicana

Binomial name
- Diceratura complicana Aarvik, 2010

Species of moth

Diceratura complicana is a species of moth of the family Tortricidae. It is found in Uganda. The habitat consists of forests.

The wingspan is 9–10 mm.
