= Spinipogon virginanus =

Scientific classification
- Kingdom: Animalia
- Phylum: Arthropoda
- Clade: Pancrustacea
- Class: Insecta
- Order: Lepidoptera
- Family: Tortricidae
- Genus: Spinipogon
- Species: S. virginanus

Binomial name
- Spinipogon virginanus Razowski & Becker, 2007

Species of moth

Spinipogon virginanus is a species of moth of the family Tortricidae. It is found on the British Virgin Islands.

The wingspan is about 9 mm.

== Etymology ==
The species name refers to the Virgin Islands, where the type locality is located.
