= Phalonia yuccatana =

"Phalonia" yuccatana

Scientific classification
- Kingdom: Animalia
- Phylum: Arthropoda
- Clade: Pancrustacea
- Class: Insecta
- Order: Lepidoptera
- Family: Tortricidae
- Subfamily: Tortricinae
- Tribe: Cochylini
- Genus: incertae sedis
- Species: "P." yuccatana

Binomial name
- "Phalonia" yuccatana Busck, 1907

Synonyms
- Nycthia yuccatana

Species of moth

"Phalonia" yuccatana is a species of moth of the family Tortricidae. It is found in North America, where it has been recorded from Texas, California and Nevada.

The wingspan is about 18 mm. Adults have been recorded on wing from February to March.

The larvae feed on Yucca baccata.
