= Maricaona =

Scientific classification
- Kingdom: Animalia
- Phylum: Arthropoda
- Clade: Pancrustacea
- Class: Insecta
- Order: Lepidoptera
- Family: Tortricidae
- Genus: Maricaona; Razowski & Becker, 2007
- Species: M. maricaonana

Binomial name
- Maricaona maricaonana Razowski & Becker, 2007

Monotypic genus of tortrix moths

Maricaona is a genus of moths in the family Tortricidae. It consists of only one species, Maricaona maricaonana, which is found in Puerto Rico in the Caribbean Sea.

The wingspan is about 14.5 mm for males and 16 mm for females.

== Etymology ==
The generic name refers to the name of the type locality of the type species. The species name refers to Maricao, Puerto Rico, the type locality.
