= Leif Aarvik =

Norwegian entomologist (born 1954)

- Born: 16 March 1954 (age 72); Gjøvik, Norway
- Education: University of Oslo
- Known for: Research on the distribution and taxonomy of Norwegian butterflies and moths
- Scientific career
- Fields: Entomology, Lepidopterology
- Institutions: Natural History Museum, University of Oslo

Leif Aarvik (born 16 March 1954) is a Norwegian entomologist specializing in Lepidoptera (butterflies and moths). He works at the Natural History Museum in Oslo and has co-authored a number of scientific publications and books in his field. Aarvik is particularly involved with studying the distribution of the slightly more than 2,300 species of butterflies and moths found in Norway.

Aarvik was originally educated as a teacher. He developed an interest in butterflies from a young age and eventually became one of Norway’s foremost specialists on Lepidoptera. His international recognition is reflected by several species named after him: Duplex aarviki Fibiger, 2008; Nola aarviki Hacker, 2012; Phyllonorycter aarviki de Prins, 2012; and Platyptilia aarviki Gielis, 2008.

== Career ==
From 1996 he held a position with the Norwegian Forest Research Institute, where he worked with insect collections. In 2000 he was temporarily engaged by the Zoological Museum in Oslo (later renamed the Natural History Museum, University of Oslo). In 2004 Aarvik obtained a permanent position as a departmental engineer at the museum, where his main responsibility is the butterfly and moth collection. His work involves three key tasks: maintaining and curating the collection, identifying new species records, and keeping the museum database up to date. Together with Lars Ove Hansen, Aarvik helped to register the national museum collections in a digital database. In collaboration with Geir Søli, he also created the online presentation Norges sommerfugler (translated: "Butterflies of Norway").

He has also worked with Artsdatabanken (the Norwegian Biodiversity Information Centre) on the preparation of the Norwegian Red List for Species concerning Lepidoptera. The Red List is a national overview of plant and animal species that are either threatened, significantly reduced in numbers, or naturally rare.

Aarvik has conducted several field studies in Africa, including in Malawi, focusing on the fauna and taxonomy of African Tortricidae (leafroller moths).

He has held several positions within the Norwegian Entomological Society, including serving as chairman from 2001. He was also a member of the Lepidopterological Working Group (Leparb), contributing to the compilation of faunistic information on Norwegian butterflies and moths from museum and private collections into a national database.
