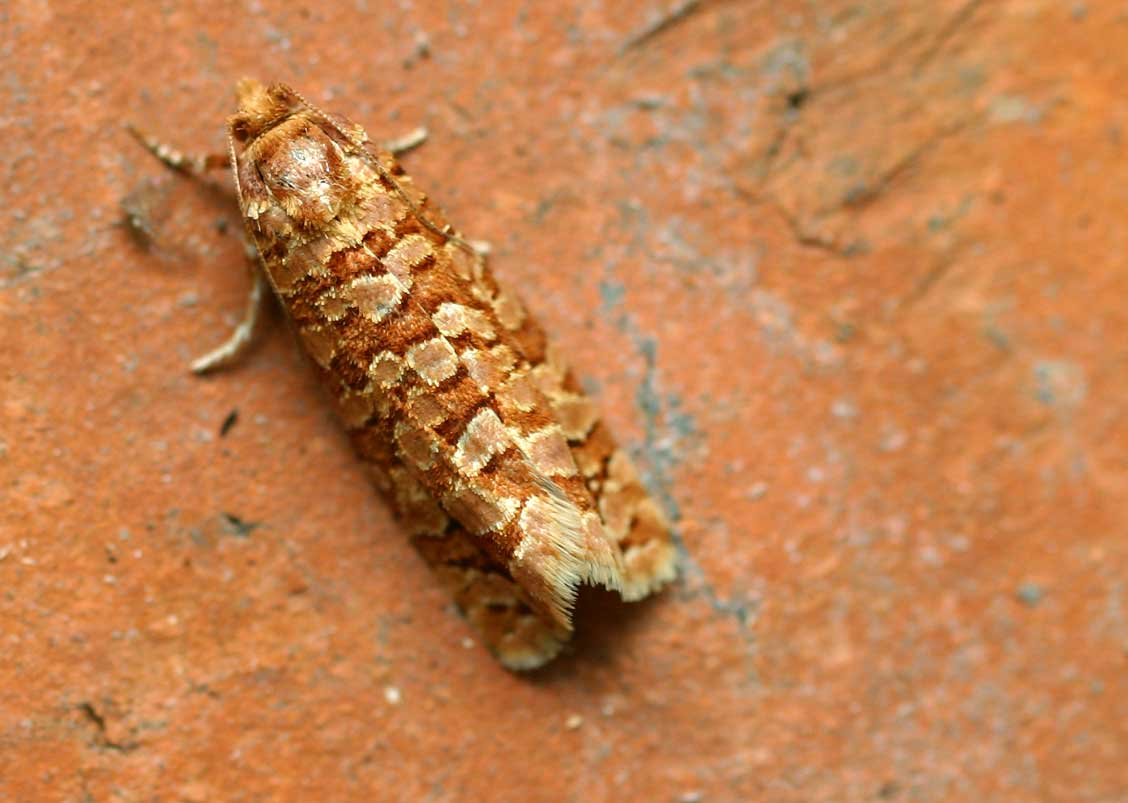

Scientific classification
- Domain: Eukaryota
- Kingdom: Animalia
- Phylum: Arthropoda
- Class: Insecta
- Order: Lepidoptera
- Family: Tortricidae
- Genus: Lozotaeniodes
- Species: L. formosana

Binomial name
- Lozotaeniodes formosana (Frolich, in Geyer & Hubner, 1830)

Synonyms
- Tortrix formosana Frolich, in Geyer & Hubner, 1830

= Lozotaeniodes formosana =

Species of moth

Lozotaeniodes formosana is a moth of the family Tortricidae. It is found in Central Europe.

The wingspan is 20–26 mm. The moth flies from June to August.

The larvae feed on Scots pine.
