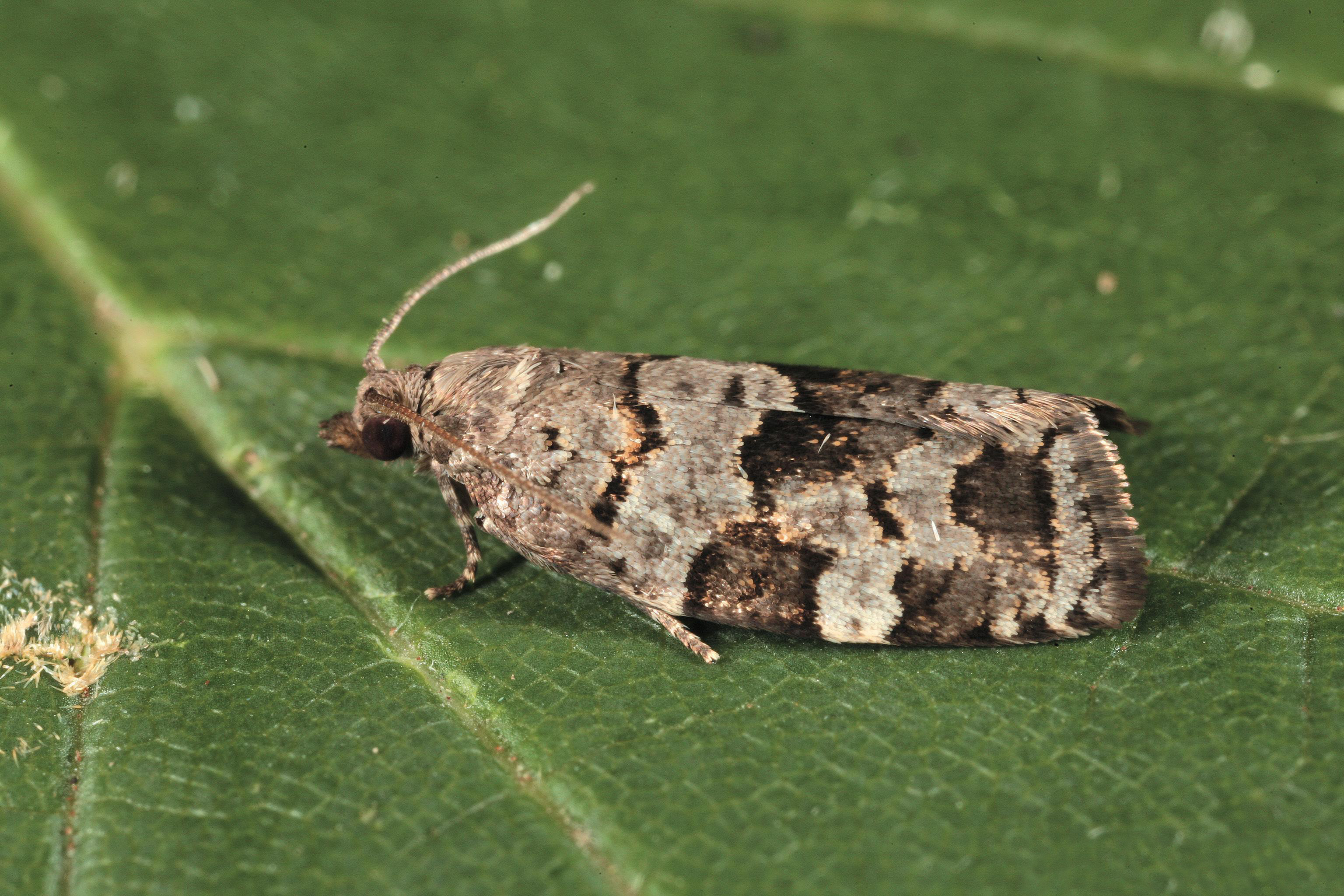

Scientific classification
- Domain: Eukaryota
- Kingdom: Animalia
- Phylum: Arthropoda
- Class: Insecta
- Order: Lepidoptera
- Family: Tortricidae
- Genus: Dichelia
- Species: D. histrionana

Binomial name
- Dichelia histrionana (Frölich, 1828)

Synonyms
- Tortrix histrionana Frölich, 1828; Tortrix pinana [Denis & Schiffermüller], 1775; Cacoecia stygiana Rebel, 1929

= Dichelia histrionana =

Species of moth

Dichelia histrionana is a species of moth of the family Tortricidae. It is found from Fennoscandia to Belgium, Italy and Greece and from the Netherlands to Poland and Romania.

The wingspan is 17–22 mm. Adults are on wing from the end of May to late August.

The larvae feed on Picea and Abies species. The species overwinters as a young larva in a mined needle. Larvae can be found from August to June of the following year.
