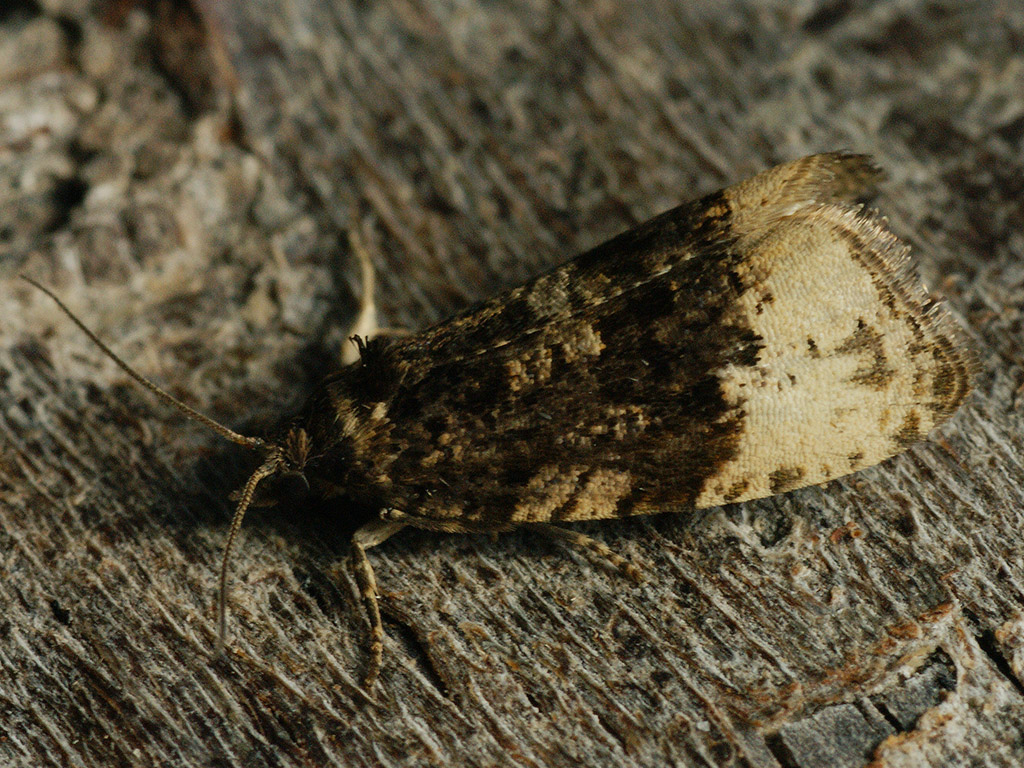
- Hedya ochroleucana Moscow Oblast
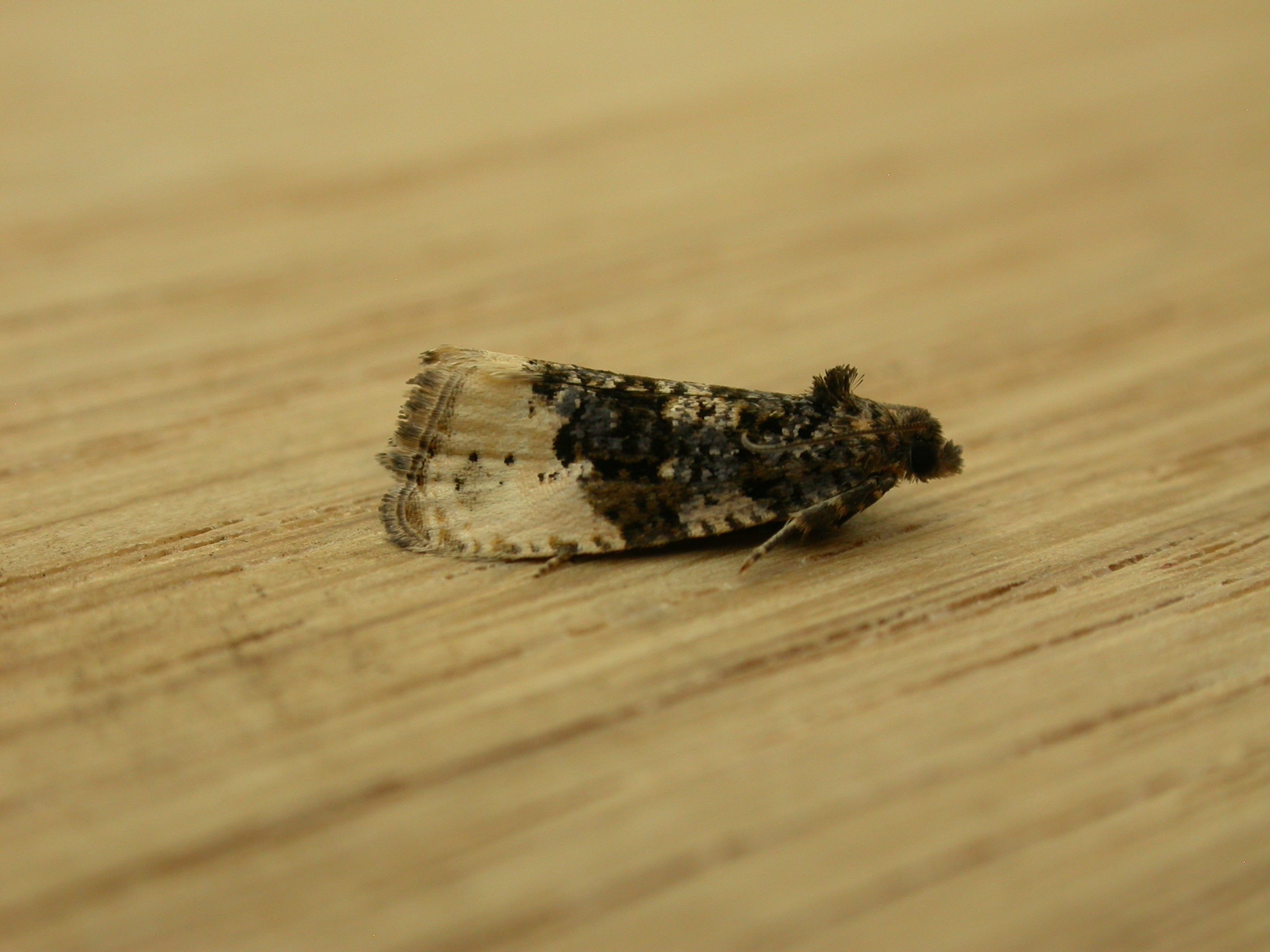

Scientific classification
- Domain: Eukaryota
- Kingdom: Animalia
- Phylum: Arthropoda
- Class: Insecta
- Order: Lepidoptera
- Family: Tortricidae
- Genus: Hedya
- Species: H. ochroleucana

Binomial name
- Hedya ochroleucana (Frölich, 1828)

Synonyms
- Tortrix ochroleucana Frolich, 1828; Penthina consanguinana Walsingham, 1879; Penthina contrariana Walker, 1863; Antithesia nimbatana Clemens, 1860

= Hedya ochroleucana =

Species of moth

Hedya ochroleucana, the buff-tipped marble or long-cloaked marble, is a moth of the family Tortricidae. It is found in most of Europe, except part of the Balkan Peninsula and Ukraine and east across the Palearctic. It is also present in most of North America.

The wingspan is 16–21 mm.The forewings are whitish ochreous, faintly pink-tinged, the margins posteriorly grey-spotted, The basal patch, central fascia, and included space are brown mixed with dark ashy-grey and black, the space strigulated with whitish ochreous on costa and fold. The posterior edge of the central fascia is slightly convex, indented above and below middle There are two or more black dots and a grey spot between the middle of fascia and the termen. The hindwings are grey, terminally darker.The larva is dark green; dorsal line darker; dots black, pale - ringed; head and plate of 2 dark brown.

Adults are on wing in June and July in western Europe.

The larvae feed on Rosa (including cultivated varieties) and Malus species. They spin the leaves together.
