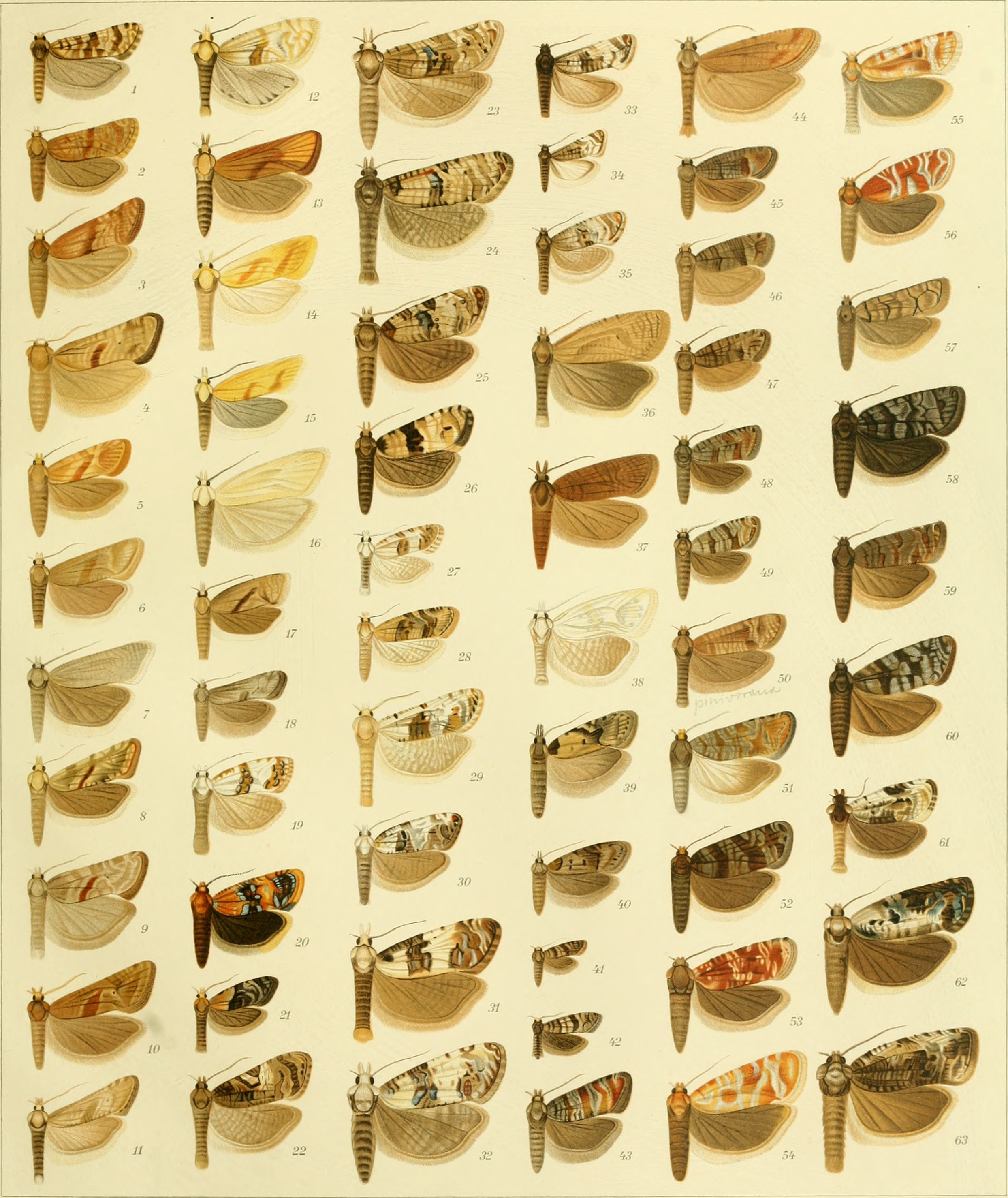
- Phtheochroa schreibersiana in Kennel Die palaearktischen tortriciden figure 21 male

Scientific classification
- Kingdom: Animalia
- Phylum: Arthropoda
- Clade: Pancrustacea
- Class: Insecta
- Order: Lepidoptera
- Family: Tortricidae
- Genus: Phtheochroa
- Species: P. schreibersiana

Binomial name
- Phtheochroa schreibersiana (Frölich, 1828)

Synonyms
- Tortrix schreibersiana Frölich, 1828

= Phtheochroa schreibersiana =

Species of moth

Phtheochroa schreibersiana is a species of moth of the family Tortricidae. It is found from Europe (Sweden, Great Britain, the Netherlands, Belgium, France, Spain, Corsica, Sardinia, Italy, Germany, Switzerland, Austria, the Czech Republic, Slovakia, Slovenia, Poland, Romania, Estonia, Latvia) to the Near East, the Caucasus and southern Russia (Sarepta). The habitat consists of hedgerows, marshes, river-banks and other damp areas.

The wingspan is 12–14 mm. Adults have been recorded on wing from May to June, in one generation per year.

The larvae feed on Ulmus minor, Prunus padus and Populus species. The species overwinters in the larval stage.
