= Metendothenia organica =

Scientific classification
- Kingdom: Animalia
- Phylum: Arthropoda
- Class: Insecta
- Order: Lepidoptera
- Family: Tortricidae
- Genus: Metendothenia
- Species: M. organica

Binomial name
- Metendothenia organica (Meyrick, 1920)

Synonyms
- Polychrosis organica Meyrick, 1920; Lobesia organica Clarke, 1958; Metendothenia mesarothra Diakonoff, 1973

Species of moth

Metendothenia organica is a moth of the family Tortricidae first described by Edward Meyrick in 1920. It is found in Sri Lanka.
