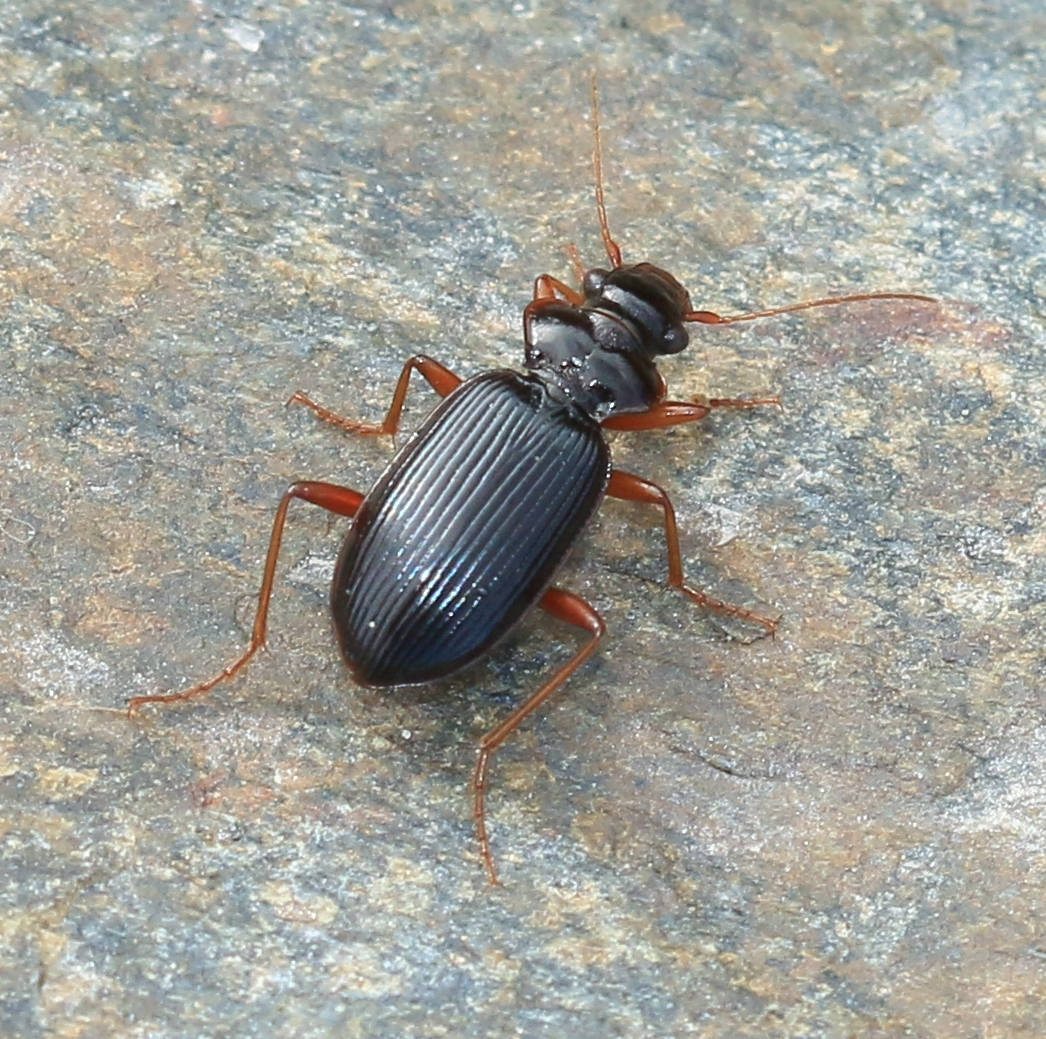
- Leistus rufomarginatus, UK

Scientific classification
- Domain: Eukaryota
- Kingdom: Animalia
- Phylum: Arthropoda
- Class: Insecta
- Order: Coleoptera
- Suborder: Adephaga
- Family: Carabidae
- Subfamily: Nebriinae
- Tribe: Nebriini
- Genus: Leistus; Frölich, 1799

Subgenera
- Evanoleistus Jedlicka, 1965; Leistus Frölich, 1799; Nebrileistus Bänninger, 1925; Pogonophorus Latreille, 1802; Sardoleistus Perrault, 1980

Diversity
- at least 250 species

= Leistus =

Genus of beetles

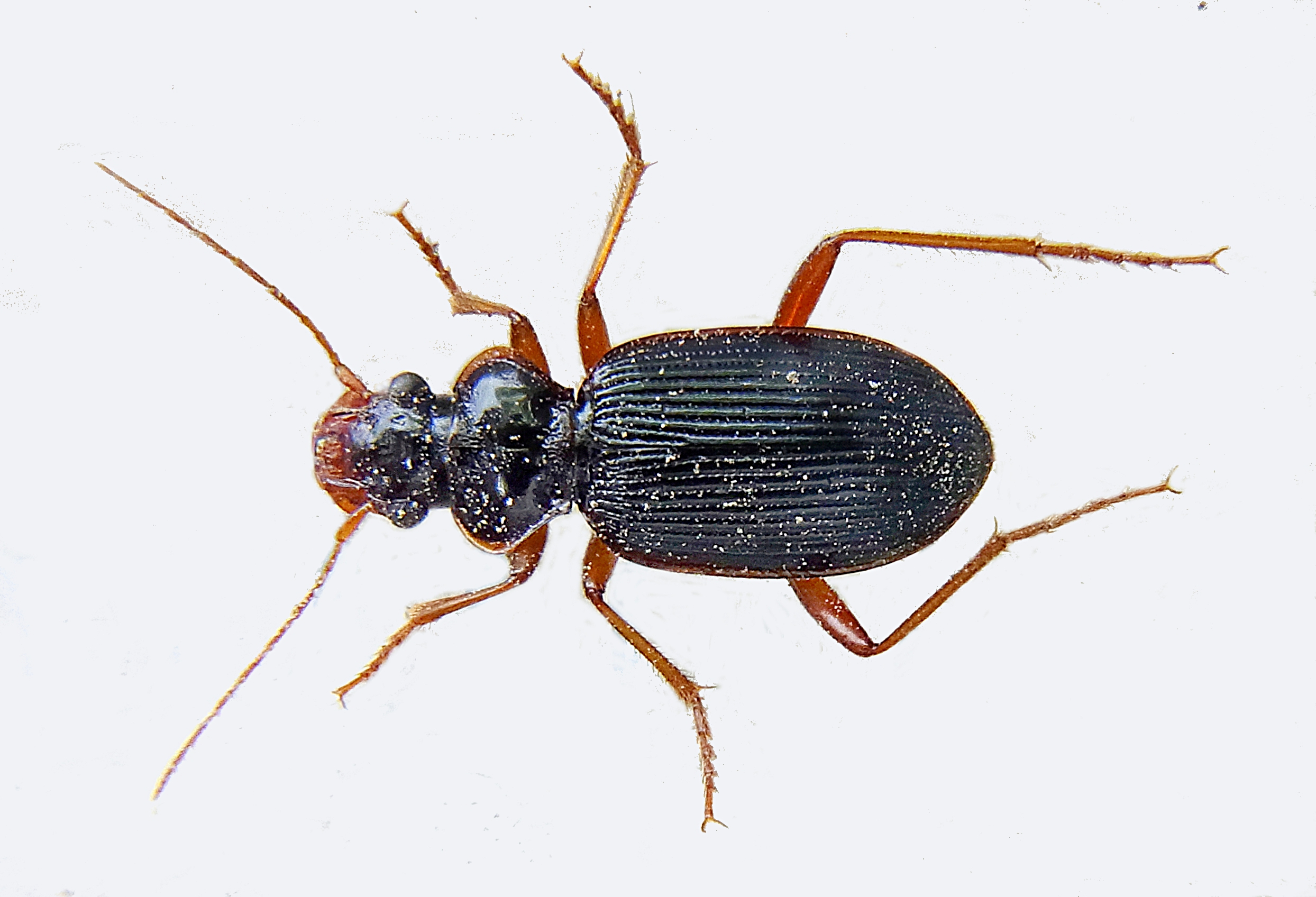
Leistus rufomarginatus

Leistus is a genus of ground beetles in the family Carabidae. There are more than 250 described species in Leistus, found in the Holarctic.

== Species ==
These 255 species belong to Leistus:

- Leistus acutangulus Perrault, 1979
- Leistus alaiensis Kabak, 1995
- Leistus andrewesi Perrault, 1985
- Leistus angulatus Piochard de la Brûlerie, 1872
- Leistus angulicollis Fairmaire, 1886
- Leistus angusticollis Dejean, 1826
- Leistus angustus Reitter, 1883
- Leistus apfelbecki Ganglbauer, 1891
- Leistus austriacus Schauberger, 1925
- Leistus baenningeri Roubal, 1926
- Leistus baima Farkac, 1999
- Leistus barkamensis Farkac, 1995
- Leistus barnevillei Chaudoir, 1867
- Leistus baudinoti Deuve, 1985
- Leistus becheti Allegro, 2007
- Leistus becvari Farkac, 1999
- Leistus birmanicus Perrault, 1985
- Leistus bjelasnicensis Apfelbeck, 1904
- Leistus bohdan Farkac, 1999
- Leistus bohemorum Sciaky, 1994
- Leistus brancuccii Farkac, 1995
- Leistus businskyi Dvorak, 1994
- Leistus cangshanicola Farkac, 1999
- Leistus caucasicus Chaudoir, 1867
- Leistus cavazzutii Farkac & Sciaky, 1998
- Leistus chalcites Andrewes, 1936
- Leistus championi Andrewes, 1920
- Leistus chaudoiri Perrault, 1986
- Leistus coiffaiti Perrault, 1990
- Leistus colpodes Deuve, 2018
- Leistus coltranei Allegro, 2007
- Leistus constrictus L.Schaufuss, 1862
- Leistus cordithorax Deuve, 2011
- Leistus crassus Bates, 1883
- Leistus crenatus Fairmaire, 1855
- Leistus crenifer Tschitscherine, 1903
- Leistus cyanioripennis Deuve, 2018
- Leistus cycloderus Tschitscherine, 1903
- Leistus cylindricus Sciaky, 1994
- Leistus dandoensis Deuve, 2009
- Leistus dandoensisoides Deuve, 2011
- Leistus daochengicus Deuve, 2011
- Leistus darvazicus Kabak, 2000
- Leistus denticollis Reitter, 1887
- Leistus depressus Breit, 1914
- Leistus deuvei Perrault, 1994
- Leistus deuveianus Farkac, 1995
- Leistus dongguensis Deuve, 2011
- Leistus dreuxi Deuve, 2018
- Leistus ebianensis Deuve, 2011
- Leistus elegans Rost, 1891
- Leistus ellipticus Wollaston, 1857
- Leistus elpis Ortuño; Arribas, 2021
- Leistus facchinii Farkac & Sciaky, 1998
- Leistus farkaci Sciaky, 1994
- Leistus femoralis Chaudoir, 1846
- Leistus ferganensis Semenov, 1928
- Leistus ferrugineus (Linnaeus, 1758)
- Leistus ferruginosus Mannerheim, 1843
- Leistus frater Reitter, 1897
- Leistus fujianensis Deuve & Tian, 1999
- Leistus fulvibarbis Dejean, 1826
- Leistus fulvus Chaudoir, 1846
- Leistus gansuensis Sciaky, 1995
- Leistus gaoligongensis Kavanaugh & Long, 1999
- Leistus geshizhaicus Deuve, 2011
- Leistus glacialis A.Fiori, 1899
- Leistus gracilentus Tschitscherine, 1903
- Leistus gracilis Fuss, 1860
- Leistus habashanicola Farkac, 1999
- Leistus haeckeli Farkac, 1995
- Leistus haisishanicus Farkac & Sciaky, 1998
- Leistus harpagon Farkac, 1998
- Leistus heinigeri Morvan, 1991
- Leistus heinzi Farkac, 1995
- Leistus heishuiensis Deuve & Tian, 2005
- Leistus hengduanicola Farkac, 1999
- Leistus hermonis Piochard de la Brûlerie, 1875
- Leistus himalchuliensis Perrault, 1986
- Leistus hodeberti Deuve, 2011
- Leistus hongyuanicus Farkac, 1999
- Leistus houzhenzi Farkac, 1999
- Leistus huichuanensis Deuve, 2011
- Leistus imitator Breit, 1914
- Leistus indus Tschitscherine, 1903
- Leistus inexspectatus Farkac, 1999
- Leistus insolitus Deuve, 2017
- Leistus ishikawai Perrault, 1984
- Leistus janae Farkac & Plutenko, 1992
- Leistus janatai Farkac, 1999
- Leistus janataianus Deuve, 2011
- Leistus janataicus Deuve, 2018
- Leistus jani Farkac, 1995
- Leistus jindrai Farkac, 1999
- Leistus jintangensis Deuve, 2011
- Leistus jirouxi Deuve, 2011
- Leistus jiudingensis Deuve & Tian, 2005
- Leistus juldusanus Reitter, 1913
- Leistus kalabi Farkac, 1995
- Leistus kalabianus Deuve, 2009
- Leistus kangdingensis Farkac, 1995
- Leistus kashmirensis Andrewes, 1927
- Leistus kazenasi Kabak, 2015
- Leistus ketmenicus Shilenkov & Kabak, 1994
- Leistus klarae Farkac, 1995
- Leistus kociani Farkac, 1999
- Leistus kozakai Perrault, 1984
- Leistus krali Farkac, 1993
- Leistus kratkyi Machado, 2020
- Leistus kryzhanovskii Dudko, 2003
- Leistus kubani Farkac, 1993
- Leistus kubanioides Deuve, 2011
- Leistus kucerai Farkac, 1995
- Leistus kuceraianus Deuve, 2011
- Leistus kumatai Habu, 1973
- Leistus kungeicus Shilenkov & Kabak, 1994
- Leistus kurosawai Morita, 2001
- Leistus kutpegen Kabak, 2016
- Leistus labrang Farkac, 1999
- Leistus lamugensis Deuve, 2011
- Leistus langmusianus Farkac, 1995
- Leistus lassallei Perrault, 1984
- Leistus latissimus Sciaky, 1995
- Leistus lebardicus Farkac; Putchkov & Rop, 2010
- Leistus lecordieri Deuve, 2011
- Leistus ledouxi Perrault, 1986
- Leistus ledouxianus Deuve, 2009
- Leistus lenkoranus Reitter, 1885
- Leistus lesteri Allegro, 2007
- Leistus lihengae Kavanaugh & Long, 1999
- Leistus loebli Perrault, 1985
- Leistus longipennis Casey, 1920
- Leistus lopatini Kabak, 2013
- Leistus ludmilae Dvorak, 1994
- Leistus madmeridianus Erwin, 1970
- Leistus magnicollis Motschulsky, 1866
- Leistus makaluensis Perrault, 1985
- Leistus manasluensis Dvorak, 1994
- Leistus maomao Deuve, 2008
- Leistus maoxianensis Deuve, 2011
- Leistus marcilhaci Deuve, 2011
- Leistus matsudai Morita, 2012
- Leistus megrelicus Shilenkov, 1999
- Leistus meissonnieri Deuve, 2009
- Leistus memorabilis Deuve, 2011
- Leistus minshanicus Deuve & Tian, 2005
- Leistus miroslavae Farkac & Sciaky, 1998
- Leistus mitjaevi Kabak, 2008
- Leistus montanus Stephens, 1827
- Leistus montreuili Deuve, 2009
- Leistus morvani Deuve & Tian, 2005
- Leistus moskvich Farkac, 1999
- Leistus murzini Farkac, 1999
- Leistus nanlingensis Deuve & Tian, 1999
- Leistus nanping Farkac, 1999
- Leistus nanshanicus Belousov & Kabak, 2000
- Leistus natruc Farkac, 1998
- Leistus negrei Perrault, 1985
- Leistus nepalensis Jedlicka, 1965
- Leistus niger Gebler, 1847
- Leistus niitakaensis Minowa, 1932
- Leistus nitidus (Duftschmid, 1812)
- Leistus nivium Andrewes, 1925
- Leistus noesskei Bänninger, 1932
- Leistus nokoensis Minowa, 1932
- Leistus nubicola Tschitscherine, 1903
- Leistus nubivagus Wollaston, 1864
- Leistus nyingtri Farkac, 1998
- Leistus obtusicollis Bates, 1883
- Leistus odvarkai Dvorak, 1994
- Leistus oopterus Chaudoir, 1861
- Leistus ovipennis Chaudoir, 1867
- Leistus ovitensis Perrault, 1974
- Leistus parvicollis Chaudoir, 1869
- Leistus pavesii Sciaky, 1994
- Leistus perraulti Sciaky, 1994
- Leistus perreaui Perrault, 1986
- Leistus phami Deuve, 2008
- Leistus piceus Frölich, 1799
- Leistus podsmetankou Farkac, 1999
- Leistus prolongatus Bates, 1883
- Leistus prunieri Deuve, 2011
- Leistus pseudocrenifer Sciaky, 1995
- Leistus pseudosabdeicus Deuve, 2018
- Leistus punctatissimus Breit, 1914
- Leistus puncticeps Fairmaire & Laboulbène, 1854
- Leistus punctifrons Deuve, 2008
- Leistus pyrenaeus Kraatz, 1863
- Leistus qingmaicoides Deuve, 2011
- Leistus qingmaicus Deuve, 2011
- Leistus reflexus Semenov, 1889
- Leistus reitteri Jakobson, 1906
- Leistus relictus Semenov, 1900
- Leistus rezabkovae Farkac & Wrase, 2015
- Leistus richteri Farkac, 1995
- Leistus rilongicus Deuve, 2018
- Leistus riwaensis Deuve, 2011
- Leistus rolex Morvan, 1991
- Leistus rousi Pulpan & Reska, 1977
- Leistus rouxi Deuve & Tian, 2005
- Leistus rufomarginatus (Duftschmid, 1812)
- Leistus sabdeicus Deuve, 2011
- Leistus sardous Baudi di Selve, 1883
- Leistus saueri Sciaky, 1994
- Leistus schuelkei Farkac & Wrase, 2010
- Leistus sciakyi Farkac, 1995
- Leistus sehnali Deuve, 2018
- Leistus semenovi Perrault, 1986
- Leistus sergeii Farkac, 1999
- Leistus shatanicus Deuve & Tian, 2005
- Leistus shenseensis Perrault, 1991
- Leistus shilenkovi Farkac in Löbl & Smetana, 2003
- Leistus shokini Deuve, 2011
- Leistus shuamaluko Farkac, 1995
- Leistus sichuanus Sciaky, 1994
- Leistus sikhotealinus Sundukov, 2009
- Leistus sikkimensis Perrault, 1984
- Leistus smetanai Farkac, 1995
- Leistus sogdianus Putchkov & Dolin, 1998
- Leistus spinangulus Reitter, 1913
- Leistus spinibarbis (Fabricius, 1775)
- Leistus starkei Assmann, 1997
- Leistus subaeneus Bates, 1883
- Leistus subtropicalis Deuve, 2011
- Leistus subuliformis Farkac, 1999
- Leistus taiwanensis Perrault, 1986
- Leistus tanaognathus Kavanaugh & Long, 1999
- Leistus tatianae Kabak & Putchkov, 2010
- Leistus terminatus (Panzer, 1793)
- Leistus terskeiensis Belousov & Kabak, 1992
- Leistus thibetanus Dvorak, 1994
- Leistus tiani Deuve, 2008
- Leistus toledanoi Farkac, 1999
- Leistus trabzonicus Farkac & Wrase, 2010
- Leistus tryznai Farkac, 1999
- Leistus tschitscherini Semenov, 1906
- Leistus ucrainicus Lazorko, 1954
- Leistus valcarceli Wrase; Ruiz-Tapiador & Zaballos, 1998
- Leistus vignai Sciaky, 1995
- Leistus wittmeri Perrault, 1985
- Leistus wolong Farkac & Sciaky, 1998
- Leistus wrasei Farkac & Sciaky, 1998
- Leistus wuduensis Deuve, 2018
- Leistus xinglongensis Deuve, 2011
- Leistus xuechengicus Deuve, 2011
- Leistus yajiangensis Farkac, 1995
- Leistus yajiangicus Deuve, 2018
- Leistus yanyuanensis Deuve, 2018
- Leistus yuae Deuve, 2011
- Leistus yunnanus Bänninger, 1925
- Leistus zamotajlovi Farkac & Sciaky, 1998
- Leistus zarudnyi Semenov, 1928
- Leistus zhanglaensis Deuve, 2011
- Leistus zhongdianus Farkac, 1999
- Leistus zoige Farkac, 1999
