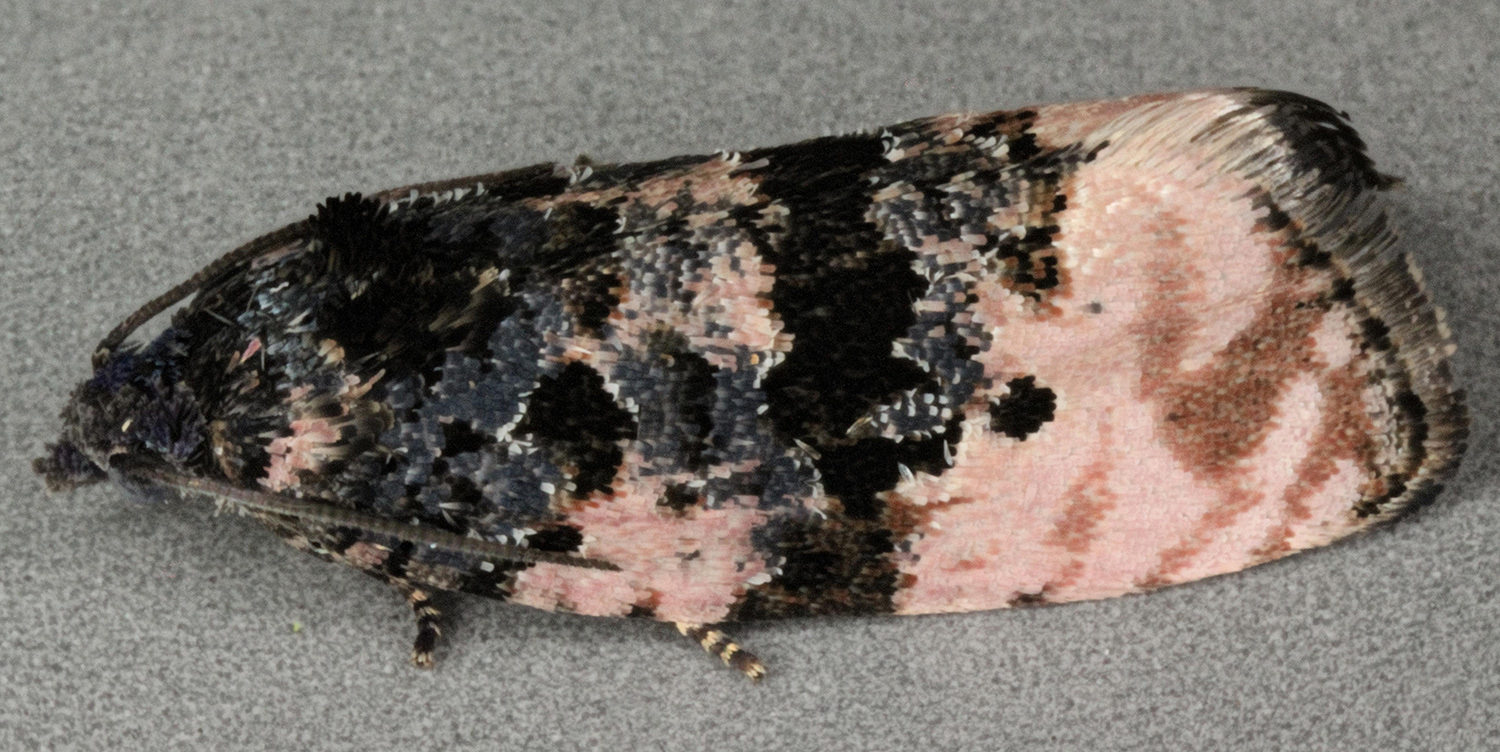

Scientific classification
- Kingdom: Animalia
- Phylum: Arthropoda
- Clade: Pancrustacea
- Class: Insecta
- Order: Lepidoptera
- Family: Tortricidae
- Genus: Metendothenia
- Species: M. atropunctana

Binomial name
- Metendothenia atropunctana (Zetterstedt, 1839)

= Metendothenia atropunctana =

Species of moth

Metendothenia atropunctana is a moth belonging to the family Tortricidae. The species was first described by Johan Wilhelm Zetterstedt in 1839.

It is native to the Palearctic and Northern America.

The wingspan is 14–17 mm. Like the species in the genus Hedya, in which it was previously placed, it resembles a bird dropping when it sits still, this gives it good protection. The thorax has a standing tuft of black hairs. The forewings are patterned in black-brown and are silver grey in the inner part, there is a square white spot at the costal edge, and the wing tip is white, in freshly hatched specimens it has a distinct pink tinge, but this eventually disappears. The hindwings are brown.

The larvae develop on the shoots Myrica gale, Betula and Salix spp.. It spins some leaves together into a pod. The pupa of the second generation overwinters in a cocoon amongst leaf-litter. The moth flies in May–June and from mid July till late August in a second generation.
