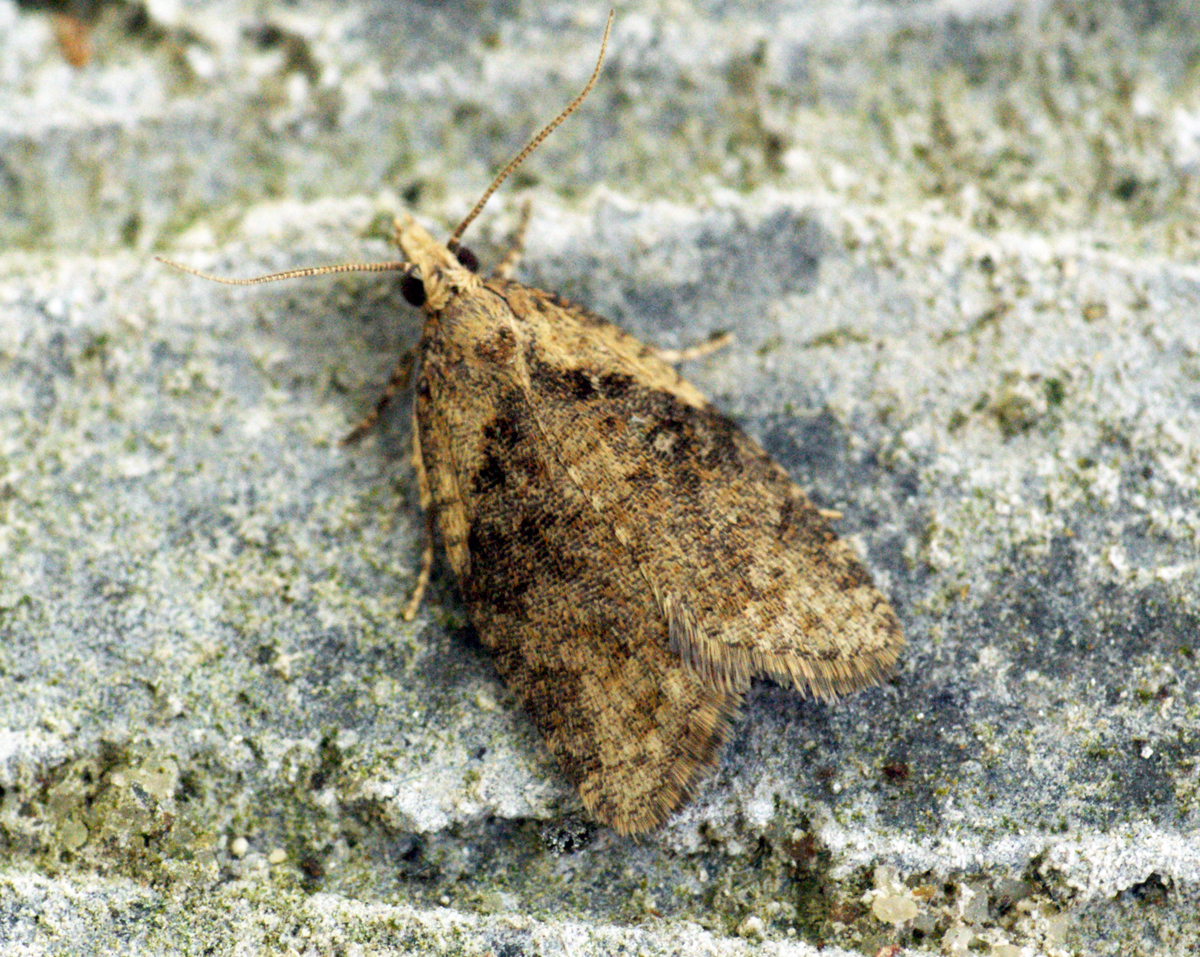
- Capua vulgana, dorsal view
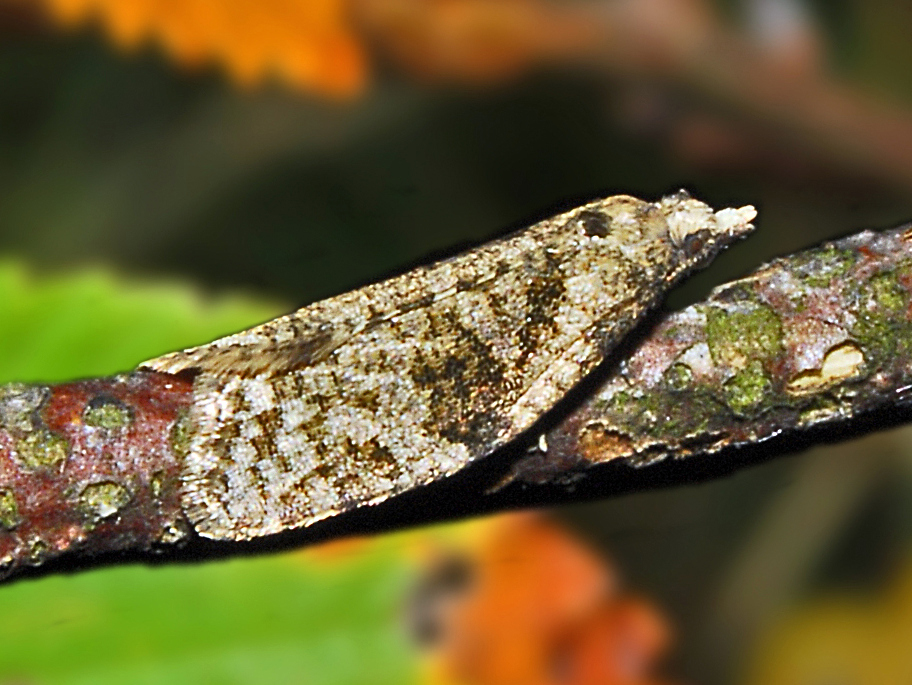
- Side view

Scientific classification
- Domain: Eukaryota
- Kingdom: Animalia
- Phylum: Arthropoda
- Class: Insecta
- Order: Lepidoptera
- Family: Tortricidae
- Genus: Capua
- Species: C. vulgana

Binomial name
- Capua vulgana (Frölich, 1828)

Synonyms
- List: Tortrix vulgana Frölich, 1828; Tortrix favillaceana Hübner, [1814-1817]; Tortrix marcidana Frölich, 1828; Capua ochraceana Stephens, 1834; Capua terreana Treitschke, 1835

= Capua vulgana =

Species of moth

Capua vulgana is a moth of the family Tortricidae found in Asia and Europe. It was first described by the German entomologist Josef Aloys Frölich in 1828.

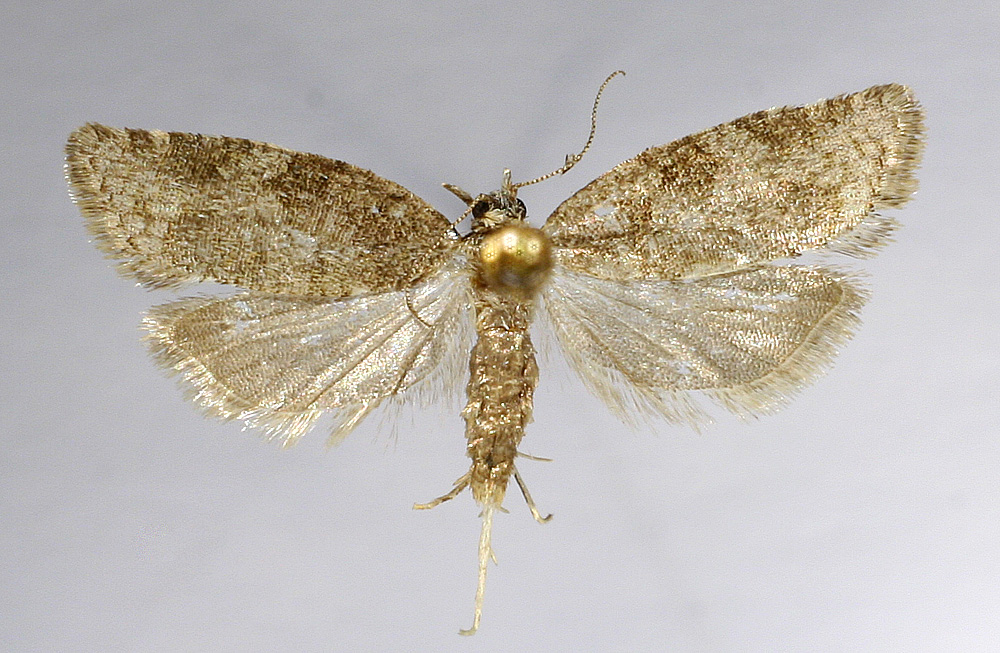
Mounted specimen

== Distribution ==
This species can be found from Ireland and Great Britain, east through the Benelux, Fennoscandia and central and south-eastern Europe to Siberia and Sakhalin to the Kuriles. It is also found in China (Heilongjiang, Inner Mongolia, Jilin, Sichuan, Shandong) and Taiwan.

== Habitat ==
These rather common moths mainly inhabit in woodlands, in open scrubs and in deciduous forests.

== Description ==
The wingspan of Capua vulgana can reach 13–19 mm. These broad-winged Tortrix moths have a buff-coloured head and pale brown forewings with dark brown markings. Males are more well-marked than the females.

== Biology ==
It is a univoltine species. Adults are on wing from May to June and can be found flying at dusk. The larvae feed on the leaves of a wide range of woodland trees and plants, including alder (Alnus glutinosa), hazel (Corylus avellana), rowan (Sorbus aucuparia), pedunculate oak (Quercus robur) and bilberry (Vaccinium myrtillus).
