= Leistus lebardicus =

Scientific classification
- Domain: Eukaryota
- Kingdom: Animalia
- Phylum: Arthropoda
- Class: Insecta
- Order: Coleoptera
- Suborder: Adephaga
- Family: Carabidae
- Genus: Leistus
- Species: L. lebardicus

Binomial name
- Leistus lebardicus Farkač, V. Putchkov & Rop, 2010

Species of ground beetle

Leistus lebardicus is a species of ground beetle found in Lebarde, Georgia. It is in the subgenus Leistus.

It is overall brown in appearance and has small eyes. It is said to be very similar to the species L. angustus. Only one specimen, a female, exists, which is the holotype found in Lebarde. The specimen is stored in the main author's collection.

== Etymology ==
The specific epithet "lebardicus" is derived from the type locality, which is Lebarde. The type locality is, in basic terms, the place where the organism is originally found.
