= Hedya iophaea =

Scientific classification
- Kingdom: Animalia
- Phylum: Arthropoda
- Class: Insecta
- Order: Lepidoptera
- Family: Tortricidae
- Genus: Hedya
- Species: H. iophaea

Binomial name
- Hedya iophaea (Meyrick, 1912)

Synonyms
- Argyroploce iophaea Meyrick, 1912

Species of moth

Hedya iophaea is a moth of the family Tortricidae. It is found in Sri Lanka, western Java, eastern Borneo and Taiwan.

The wingspan is 9–12 mm.
