= Leistus nanshanicus =

Scientific classification
- Domain: Eukaryota
- Kingdom: Animalia
- Phylum: Arthropoda
- Class: Insecta
- Order: Coleoptera
- Suborder: Adephaga
- Family: Carabidae
- Genus: Leistus
- Species: L. nanshanicus

Binomial name
- Leistus nanshanicus Belousov & Kabak, 2000

Species of beetle

Leistus nanshanicus is a species of ground beetle that can be found in the Gansu Province, China. It belongs to the subgenus Evanoleistus.

== Distribution and ecology ==
The species is known from 22 specimens and can be found in the Qilian Mountains of China at elevations of 2900–3450 m (9500–11300 ft) asl.

The species seems to prefer alpine meadows.

== Etymology ==
The specific epithet "nanshanicus" is derived from the type locality, the Nan Shan Mountains (Qilian Mountains).
