= Metendothenia fidelis =

Scientific classification
- Kingdom: Animalia
- Phylum: Arthropoda
- Class: Insecta
- Order: Lepidoptera
- Family: Tortricidae
- Genus: Metendothenia
- Species: M. fidelis

Binomial name
- Metendothenia fidelis Diakonoff, 1973

Species of moth

Metendothenia fidelis is a moth of the family Tortricidae first described by Alexey Diakonoff in 1973. It is found in Sri Lanka, East Timor and Bali.
