= Leistus tanaognathus =

Scientific classification
- Kingdom: Animalia
- Phylum: Arthropoda
- Class: Insecta
- Order: Coleoptera
- Suborder: Adephaga
- Family: Carabidae
- Genus: Leistus
- Species: L. tanaognathus

Binomial name
- Leistus tanaognathus Kavanaugh & Long, 1999

Species of beetle

Leistus tanaognathus is a species of ground beetle found in the Yunnan Province, China.

== Description ==
The color scheme in this species is black, reddish brown, and pale red. The legs, except the femora, are reddish. The pronotum and elytra are black but the pronotal lateral margin is paler. The pronotum is shiny but the rest of the body is relatively matte, although the elytra are slightly iridescent.

== Distribution and ecology ==
The species is only known from one specimen from Nankang Yakou, Baoshan County in the Yunnan Province.

The holotype was found running across dry leaf litter near a stream but was not found again. 80 specimens of L. gaoligongensis, a species described at the same time as L. tanaognathus, were found in the same place.

== Etymology ==
The specific epithet of this species comes from the Greek words "tanaos" (long) and "gnathos" (jaw), which refer to its characteristically long jaws.
