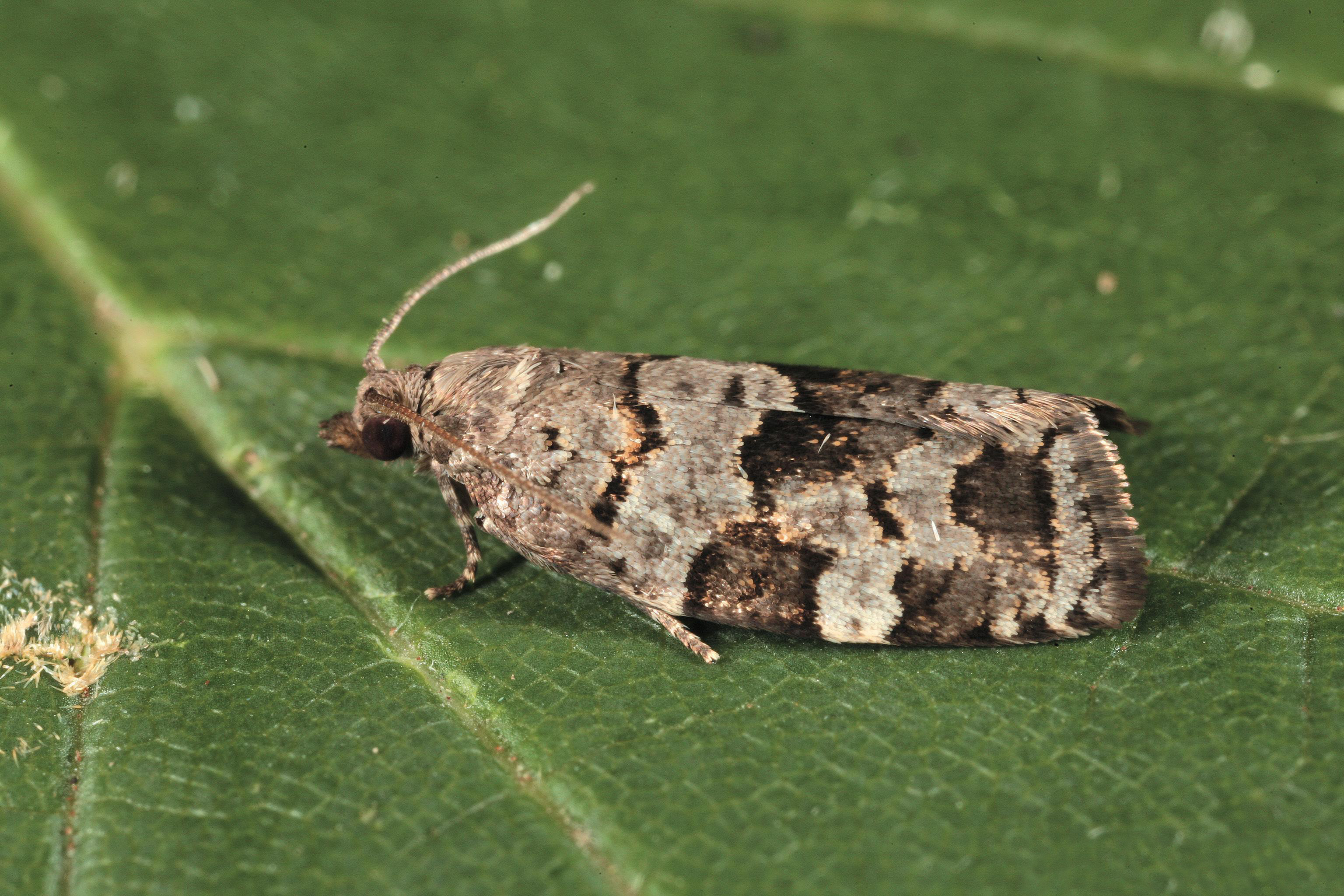
- Dichelia histrionana

Scientific classification
- Kingdom: Animalia
- Phylum: Arthropoda
- Class: Insecta
- Order: Lepidoptera
- Family: Tortricidae
- Tribe: Archipini
- Genus: Dichelia; Guenee, 1845

Synonyms
- Parasyndemis Obraztsov, 1954

= Dichelia =

Genus of tortrix moths

Dichelia is a genus of moths in the tribe Archipini.

== Species ==
- Dichelia alexiana (Kennel, 1919)
- Dichelia histrionana (Frolich, 1828)
- Dichelia miserabilis Strand, 1918
- Dichelia numidicola Chambon, in ChambonFabre & Khemeci, 1990
- Dichelia clarana Meyrick, 1881

== See also ==
- List of Tortricidae genera
