= Leistus montanus =

Scientific classification
- Kingdom: Animalia
- Phylum: Arthropoda
- Clade: Pancrustacea
- Class: Insecta
- Order: Coleoptera
- Suborder: Adephaga
- Family: Carabidae
- Genus: Leistus
- Species: L. montanus

Binomial name
- Leistus montanus Stephens, 1827

Species of beetle

Leistus montanus is a species of ground beetle native to Europe.

== Habitat ==
Leistus montanus is commonly found in mountain ranges of Central Europe. It has also been found in Turkey and Syria.
