= Leistus tatianae =

Scientific classification
- Domain: Eukaryota
- Kingdom: Animalia
- Phylum: Arthropoda
- Class: Insecta
- Order: Coleoptera
- Suborder: Adephaga
- Family: Carabidae
- Genus: Leistus
- Species: L. tatianae

Binomial name
- Leistus tatianae Kabak & Putchkov, 2010

Species of beetle

Leistus tatianae is a species of ground beetle that can be found in Kazakhstan. It belongs to the subgenus Pogonophorus and is morphologically similar to the species L. tschitscherini.

== Distribution and ecology ==
The species is known from the Bayankol River in Kazakhstan. Specimens were collected from stream banks at an elevation of 3000 m (10000 ft) ASL.
