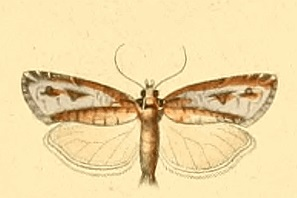

Scientific classification
- Domain: Eukaryota
- Kingdom: Animalia
- Phylum: Arthropoda
- Class: Insecta
- Order: Lepidoptera
- Family: Tortricidae
- Genus: Lozotaeniodes
- Species: L. cupressana

Binomial name
- Lozotaeniodes cupressana (Duponchel, in Godart, 1836)

Synonyms
- Tortrix cupressana Duponchel, in Godart, 1836; Tortrix compressana Boyer de Fons-Colombre, 1840; Semasia lucasiana Soffner, 1957; Lozotaeniodes nobilana Kuznetzov, in Medvedev, 1978; Coccyx nobiliana Staudinger, 1859

= Lozotaeniodes cupressana =

Species of moth

Lozotaeniodes cupressana is a species of moth of the family Tortricidae. It is found in France, Italy, Portugal, Spain, Slovenia, North Africa and the Near East.

The wingspan is 22–27 mm. Adults are on wing from April to June.

The larvae feed on Juniperus oxycedrus and Juniperus macrocarpa. Larvae can be found from March to June.
