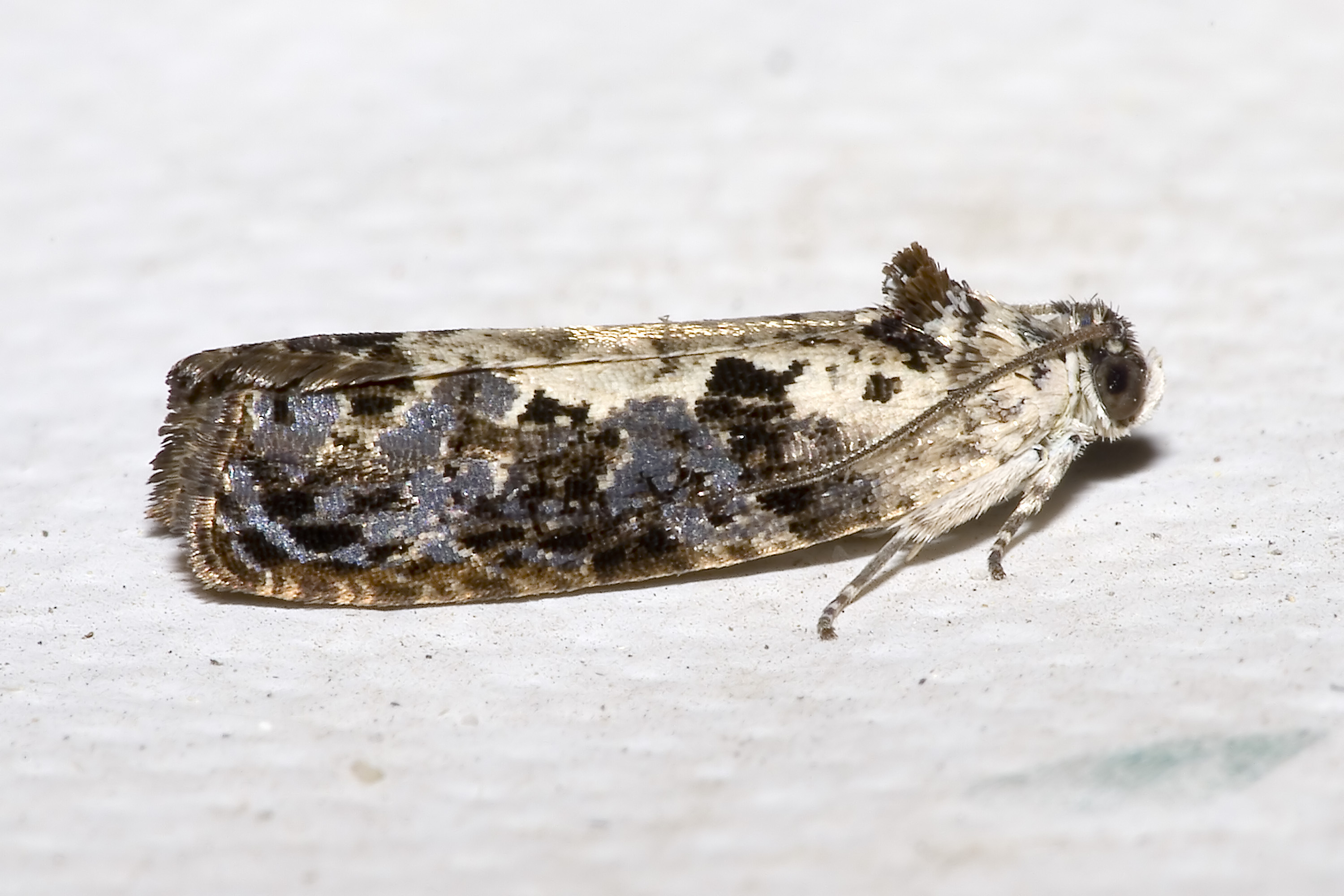

Scientific classification
- Kingdom: Animalia
- Phylum: Arthropoda
- Class: Insecta
- Order: Lepidoptera
- Family: Tortricidae
- Genus: Hedya
- Species: H. salicella

Binomial name
- Hedya salicella (Linnaeus, 1758)

= Hedya salicella =

Species of moth

Hedya salicella is a moth of the family Tortricidae. It is found in Europe.

The wingspan is 19–24 mm. The moth flies from June to October..

The larvae feed on large holes and willow and poplar.

== Notes ==
1. The flight season refers to Belgium and The Netherlands. This may vary in other parts of the range.
