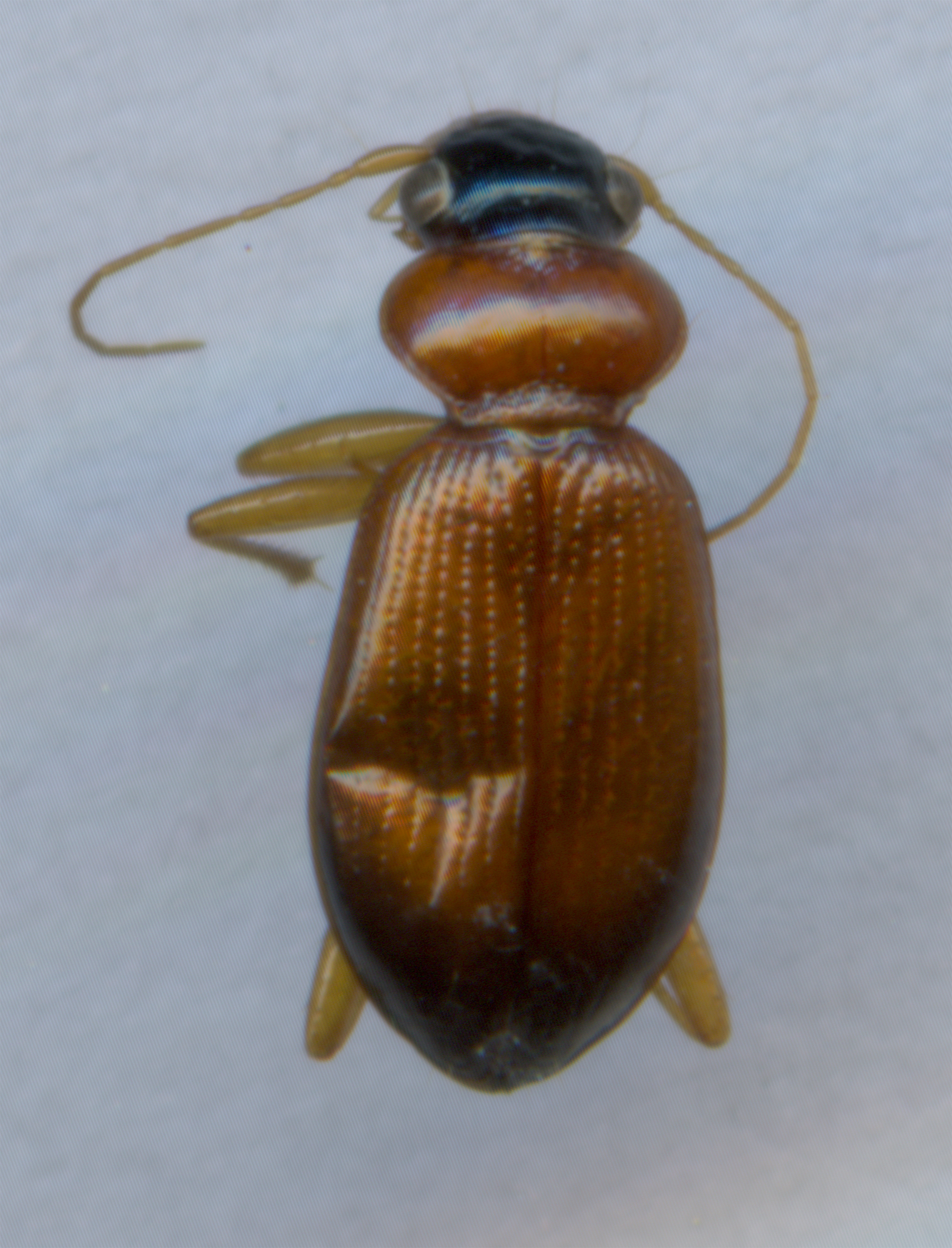

Scientific classification
- Kingdom: Animalia
- Phylum: Arthropoda
- Clade: Pancrustacea
- Class: Insecta
- Order: Coleoptera
- Suborder: Adephaga
- Family: Carabidae
- Genus: Leistus
- Species: L. terminatus

Binomial name
- Leistus terminatus (Panzer, 1793)

= Leistus terminatus =

Species of beetle

Leistus terminatus is a species of ground beetle that is native to the Palearctic realm and Europe, where it can be found in countries like Austria, the Baltic states, Benelux, Great Britain including the Isle of Man, the Czech Republic, mainland France, Germany, Hungary, the Republic of Ireland, mainland Italy, North Macedonia, Northern Ireland, mainland Poland, Romania, Scandinavia, Slovakia, Slovenia, Switzerland, and eastern Europe.

== Habitat conditions ==
Leistus terminatus prefer damp habitat conditions. Leistus terminatus can be found in woodlands, grasslands, moorlands, and peat bogs.

== Visual characteristics ==
Leistus terminatus are identified by their glossy reddish-brown and black head.

An adult leistus terminatus can grow to be 6-8 millimeters long.
