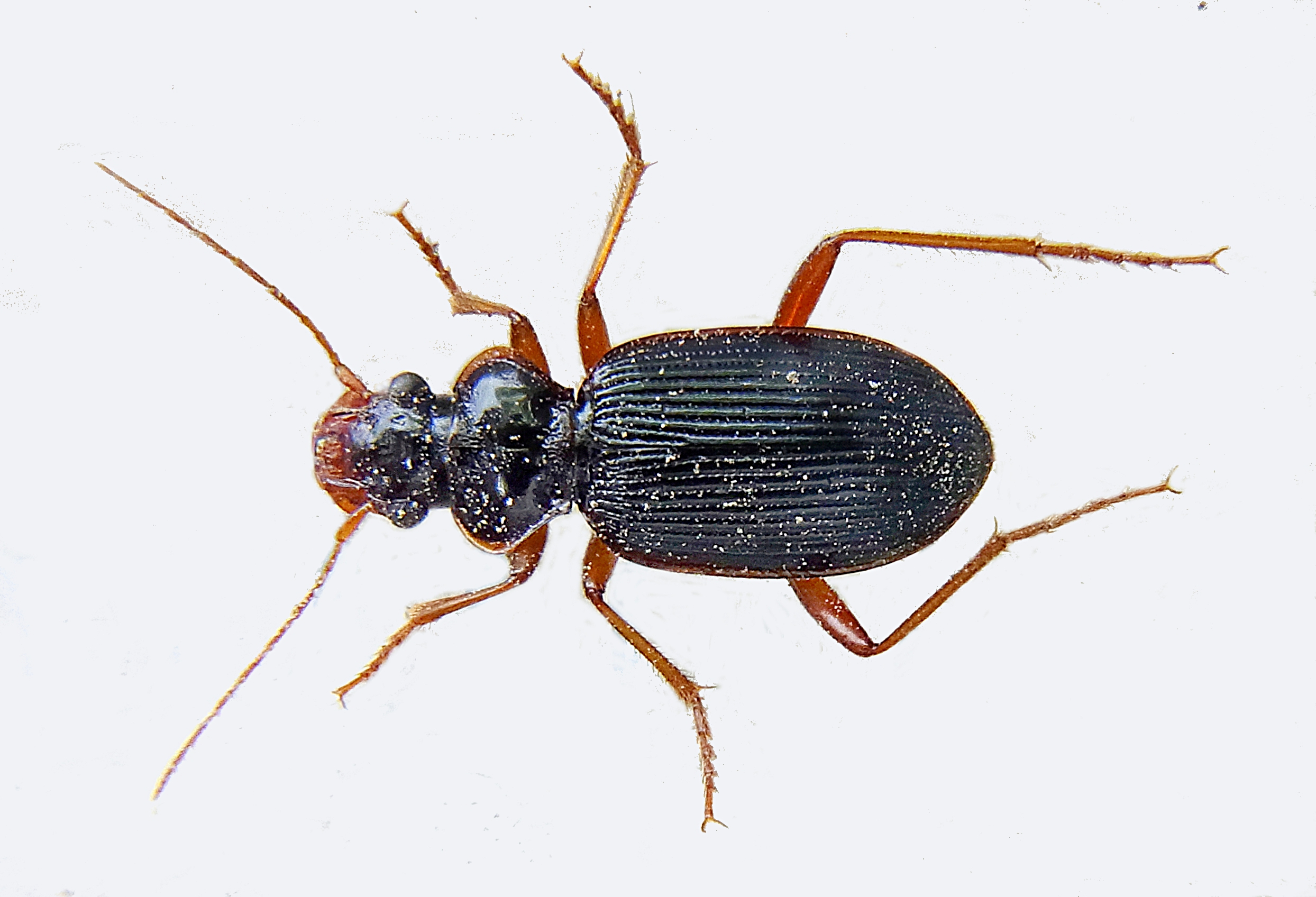

Scientific classification
- Kingdom: Animalia
- Phylum: Arthropoda
- Clade: Pancrustacea
- Class: Insecta
- Order: Coleoptera
- Suborder: Adephaga
- Family: Carabidae
- Genus: Leistus
- Species: L. rufomarginatus

Binomial name
- Leistus rufomarginatus (Duftschmid, 1812)

= Leistus rufomarginatus =

Species of beetle

Leistus rufomarginatus is a species of ground beetle that is native to Europe where it can be found in the following regions: Albania, Austria, the Baltic states (except for Estonia), Benelux, Great Britain including the Isle of Man, the Czech Republic, Denmark, France, Germany, Greece, Hungary, the Republic of Ireland, Italy, Liechtenstein, Moldova, Northern Ireland, mainland Poland, Romania, Slovakia, Sweden, Switzerland, Ukraine, the states of former Yugoslavia, and the European part of Turkey.

== Biology ==
Both larvae and imagos mainly prey on springtails. They are mainly found in moist bushes and deciduous forests. They are also found elsewhere, but not as commonly, such as coniferous forests, and very rarely in parks and gardens.
