= Leistus madmeridianus =

Scientific classification
- Domain: Eukaryota
- Kingdom: Animalia
- Phylum: Arthropoda
- Class: Insecta
- Order: Coleoptera
- Suborder: Adephaga
- Family: Carabidae
- Genus: Leistus
- Species: L. madmeridianus

Binomial name
- Leistus madmeridianus Erwin, 1970

Species of beetle

Leistus madmeridianus, the Mad river basket-throat, is a species of beetle of the Carabidae family. This species is found in the United States (California), where it inhabits coniferous redwood forests, south of the Mad River.

Adults are brachypterous.
