= Leistus trabzonicus =

Scientific classification
- Kingdom: Animalia
- Phylum: Arthropoda
- Class: Insecta
- Order: Coleoptera
- Suborder: Adephaga
- Family: Carabidae
- Genus: Leistus
- Species: L. trabzonicus

Binomial name
- Leistus trabzonicus Farkač & Wrase, 2010

Species of beetle

Leistus trabzonicus is a species of ground beetle found south of Uzongöl, Trabzon Province, Turkey. It belongs to the subgenus Leistus.

The species is based on four specimens: three females and one male. The male is the holotype, which is the individual that the species is founded on.

== Description ==
The main color is black but the appendages are more brownish. L. trabzonicus is similar to the species L. chaudoiri.

== Distribution and ecology ==
L. trabzonicus is currently only known from the type locality, which, in simple terms, is the place where it was originally found. The type locality is exactly shared by L. schuelkei. It was found at an elevation of 2050 m (6725 ft). The area it was found in was very rocky and was covered in grass, with no trees. It was specifically found in a drainage channel by sifting moss and grass.

It is hypothesized that it has a limited distribution because it cannot fly.

== Etymology ==
The specific epithet is derived from the type locality, the Trabzon Province.
