= Leistus schuelkei =

Scientific classification
- Domain: Eukaryota
- Kingdom: Animalia
- Phylum: Arthropoda
- Class: Insecta
- Order: Coleoptera
- Suborder: Adephaga
- Family: Carabidae
- Genus: Leistus
- Species: L. schuelkei

Binomial name
- Leistus schuelkei Fakač & Wrase, 2010

Species of beetle

Leistus schuelkei is a species of ground beetle that can be found in Turkey. It is in the subgenus Leistus.

The species is based on 5 specimens caught in the same spot at an altitude of 2050 m (6725 ft) in north-eastern Turkey.

== Description ==
Leistus schuelkei is glossy dark, but the limbs are a bit paler and more brownish.

== Etymology ==
The specific epithet "schuelkei" is a tribute to one of the authors' friends. His name is Michael Schülke and he was the one to bring them the specimens the authors used to describe L. schuelkei and another species, L. trabzonicus.
