= Leistus longipennis =

Scientific classification
- Kingdom: Animalia
- Phylum: Arthropoda
- Class: Insecta
- Order: Coleoptera
- Suborder: Adephaga
- Family: Carabidae
- Genus: Leistus
- Species: L. longipennis

Binomial name
- Leistus longipennis Casey, 1920

Species of beetle

Leistus longipennis, the long-winged basket-throat, is a species of beetle of the Carabidae family. This species is found in the United States (California and Oregon), where it inhabits lowlands and coastal foothills in coniferous redwood forests.

Adults are brachypterous.
