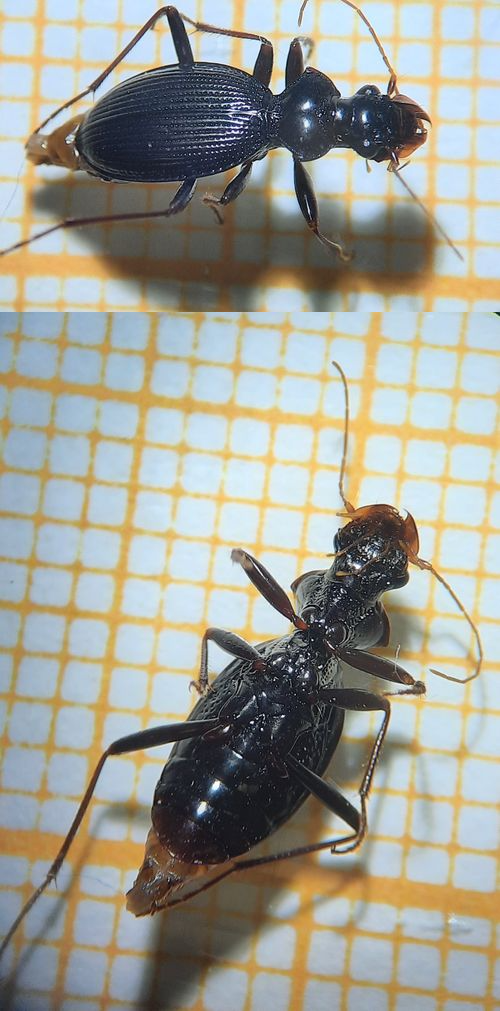

Scientific classification
- Domain: Eukaryota
- Kingdom: Animalia
- Phylum: Arthropoda
- Class: Insecta
- Order: Coleoptera
- Suborder: Adephaga
- Family: Carabidae
- Genus: Leistus
- Species: L. acutangulus

Binomial name
- Leistus acutangulus Perrault, 1979

= Leistus acutangulus =

Species of beetle

Leistus acutangulus is a species of ground beetle found in Portugal and Spain. It is in the subgenus Leistus.

== Description ==
Leistus acutangulus has a very distinct pronotum, which contains the diagnostic character. The diagnostic character is an angulately enlarged pronotal margin as seen in the image inside the taxobox.
