= Dichelia miserabilis =

Scientific classification
- Domain: Eukaryota
- Kingdom: Animalia
- Phylum: Arthropoda
- Class: Insecta
- Order: Lepidoptera
- Family: Tortricidae
- Genus: Dichelia
- Species: D. miserabilis

Binomial name
- Dichelia miserabilis Strand, 1918

Species of moth

Dichelia miserabilis is a species of moth of the family Tortricidae. It is found in Taiwan.
