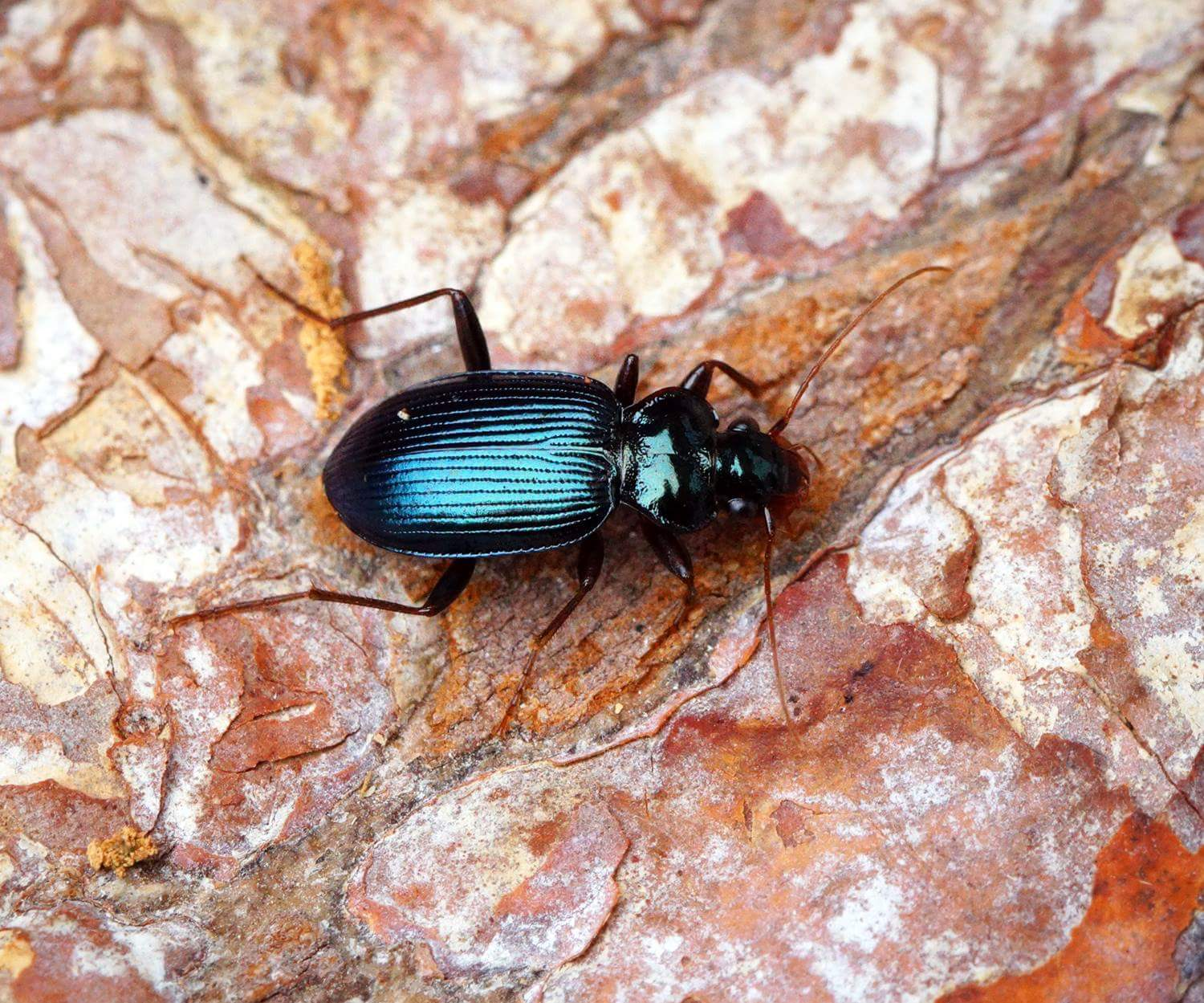
- Leistus spinibarbis, United Kingdom

Scientific classification
- Domain: Eukaryota
- Kingdom: Animalia
- Phylum: Arthropoda
- Class: Insecta
- Order: Coleoptera
- Suborder: Adephaga
- Family: Carabidae
- Genus: Leistus
- Species: L. spinibarbis

Binomial name
- Leistus spinibarbis (Fabricius, 1775)

Synonyms
- Carabus spinibarbis Fabricius, 1775

= Leistus spinibarbis =

Species of beetle

Leistus spinibarbis is a species of ground beetle in the family Carabidae. It is found in the Palearctic, including North Africa.

== Subspecies ==
These eight subspecies belong to the species Leistus spinibarbis:

- Leistus spinibarbis abdominalis Reiche & Saulcy, 1855 (Israel/ Palestine, Lebanon, and Syria)
- Leistus spinibarbis afer Coquerel, 1859 (Algeria and Tunisia)
- Leistus spinibarbis expansus Putzeys, 1874 (France, Morocco, Portugal, and Spain)
- Leistus spinibarbis fiorii Lutshnik, 1913 (Italy)
- Leistus spinibarbis ponticus Kryzhanovskij & Shilenkov, 1999 (Russia and Ukraine)
- Leistus spinibarbis rufipes Chaudoir, 1843 ((former) (Europe)
- Leistus spinibarbis spinibarbis (Fabricius, 1775) (Europe)
- Leistus spinibarbis zagrosensis Muilwijk, Seiedy & Wrase, 2021
