= Leistus janae =

Scientific classification
- Kingdom: Animalia
- Phylum: Arthropoda
- Class: Insecta
- Order: Coleoptera
- Suborder: Adephaga
- Family: Carabidae
- Genus: Leistus
- Species: L. janae

Binomial name
- Leistus janae Farkač & Plutenko, 1992

Species of beetle

Leistus janae is a species of ground beetle that can be found in Russia, far east, on Mt. Oblachnaya. It belongs to the subgenus Leistus.

== Description ==
Leistus janae is 8.5–9 mm (0.33–0.35 in) in length. It is dark brown and is similar to the species L. frater and L. juldusanus.

== Distribution ==
It has been found in scree fields on the far east side of Russia in the Sikhote-Alin Mountains at an elevation of 1,750 m (5,741 ft). They can be found by turning over rocks.

== Etymology ==
The specific epithet "janae" is a tribute to the wife of the first author, Jana. The first author is Jan Farkač.
