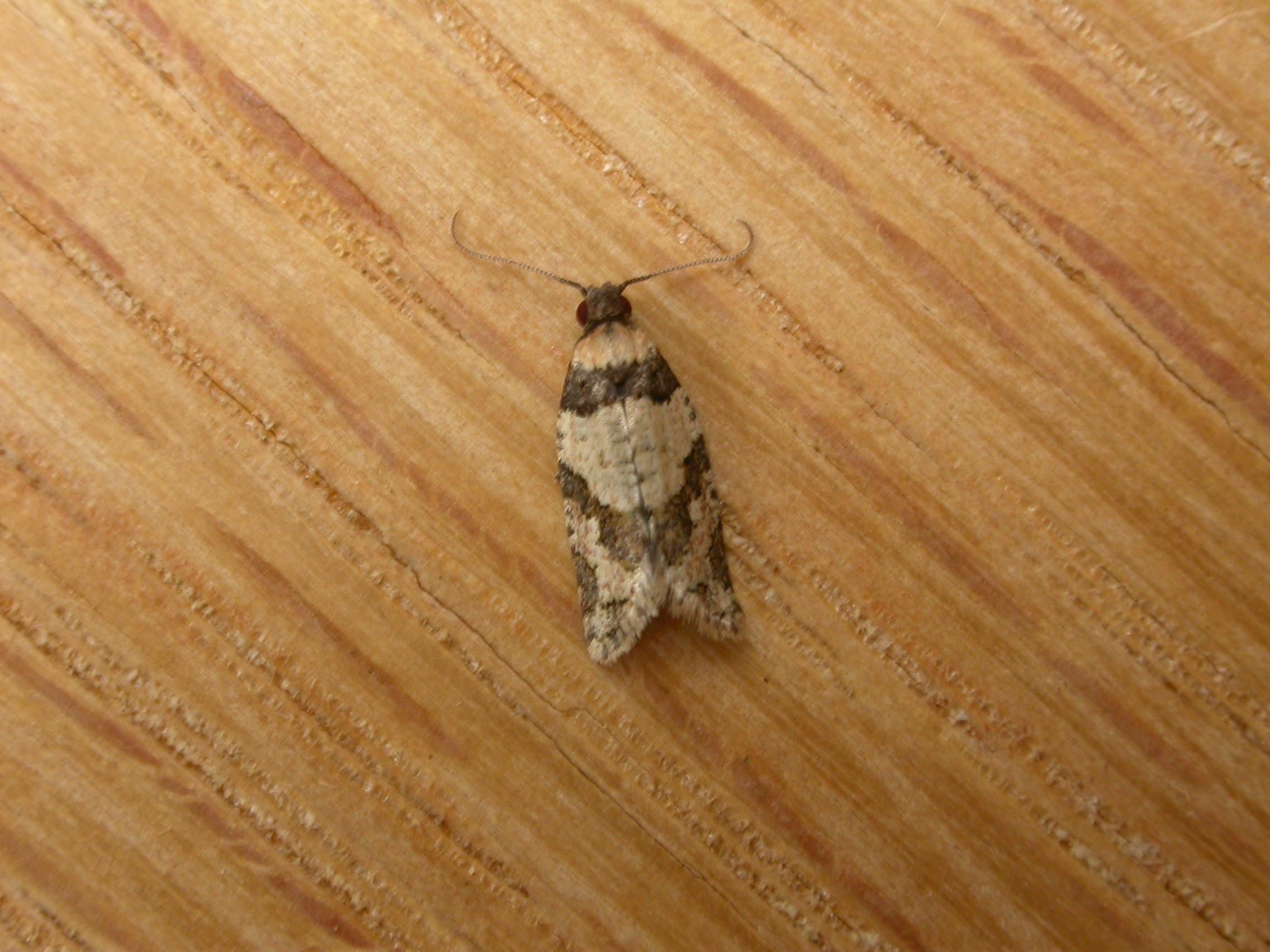

Scientific classification
- Domain: Eukaryota
- Kingdom: Animalia
- Phylum: Arthropoda
- Class: Insecta
- Order: Lepidoptera
- Family: Tortricidae
- Genus: Dichelia
- Species: D. clarana

Binomial name
- Dichelia clarana Meyrick, 1881

= Dichelia clarana =

Species of moth

Dichelia clarana is a species of moth of the family Tortricidae. It is found in Australia.
