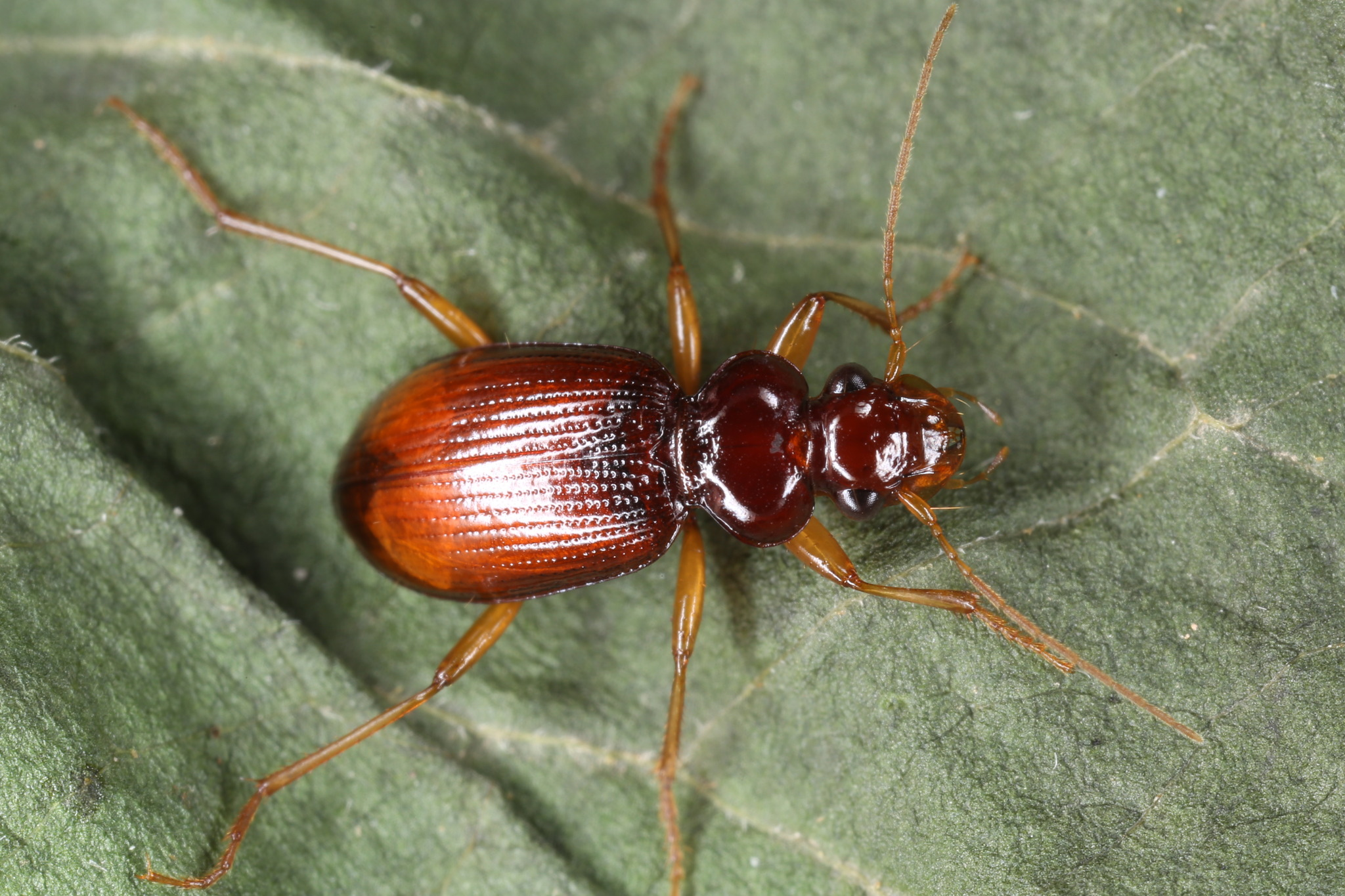
- Leistus ferrugineus, Austria

Scientific classification
- Kingdom: Animalia
- Phylum: Arthropoda
- Class: Insecta
- Order: Coleoptera
- Suborder: Adephaga
- Family: Carabidae
- Genus: Leistus
- Species: L. ferrugineus

Binomial name
- Leistus ferrugineus (Linnaeus, 1758)

Synonyms
- Carabus ferrugineus Linnaeus, 1758; Leistus kulti Smetana, 1952; Leistus testaceus Frölich, 1799; Carabus spinilabris Panzer, 1796

= Leistus ferrugineus =

Species of beetle

Leistus ferrugineus, the Palearctic rusty basket-throat, is a species of ground beetle in the family Carabidae. It is found in the Palearctic and is introduced in northeastern North America.

Its habitat consists of mixed forests, where it is found on moist gravelly ground and grassy areas, as well as in hedges, and open woodland. Adults are brachypterous.
