= Hedya zoyphium =

Scientific classification
- Domain: Eukaryota
- Kingdom: Animalia
- Phylum: Arthropoda
- Class: Insecta
- Order: Lepidoptera
- Family: Tortricidae
- Genus: Hedya
- Species: H. zoyphium

Binomial name
- Hedya zoyphium Razowski & Wojtusiak, 2011

Species of moth

Hedya zoyphium is a species of moth of the family Tortricidae. It is found in Colombia.

The wingspan is about 14 mm.
