= Leistus ferruginosus =

Scientific classification
- Kingdom: Animalia
- Phylum: Arthropoda
- Class: Insecta
- Order: Coleoptera
- Suborder: Adephaga
- Family: Carabidae
- Genus: Leistus
- Species: L. ferruginosus

Binomial name
- Leistus ferruginosus Mannerheim, 1843

Synonyms
- Leistus nigropiceus Casey, 1913; Leistus ferrugineus Dejean, 1831

Species of beetle

Leistus ferruginosus, the Nearctic rusty basket-throat, is a species of ground beetle in the family Carabidae. They are found in North America, where they inhabit deciduous forests on moderately moist, somewhat shaded ground.
