= Leistus matsudai =

Scientific classification
- Kingdom: Animalia
- Phylum: Arthropoda
- Class: Insecta
- Order: Coleoptera
- Suborder: Adephaga
- Family: Carabidae
- Genus: Leistus
- Species: L. matsudai

Binomial name
- Leistus matsudai Morita, 2012

Species of beetle

Leistus matsudai is a species of ground beetle that can be found in Central Japan. It belongs to the subgenus Pogonophorus.

== Distribution and ecology ==
The species can be found in Nara and Mie prefectures in the Kinki District, Central Japan.

It may be found under mosses, barks, flakes, and in cracks in walls.

== Etymology ==
The specific epithet "matsudai" is a tribute to Mr. Tsutomu Matsuda, an old friend of the author, because of his help supplying materials for his work.
