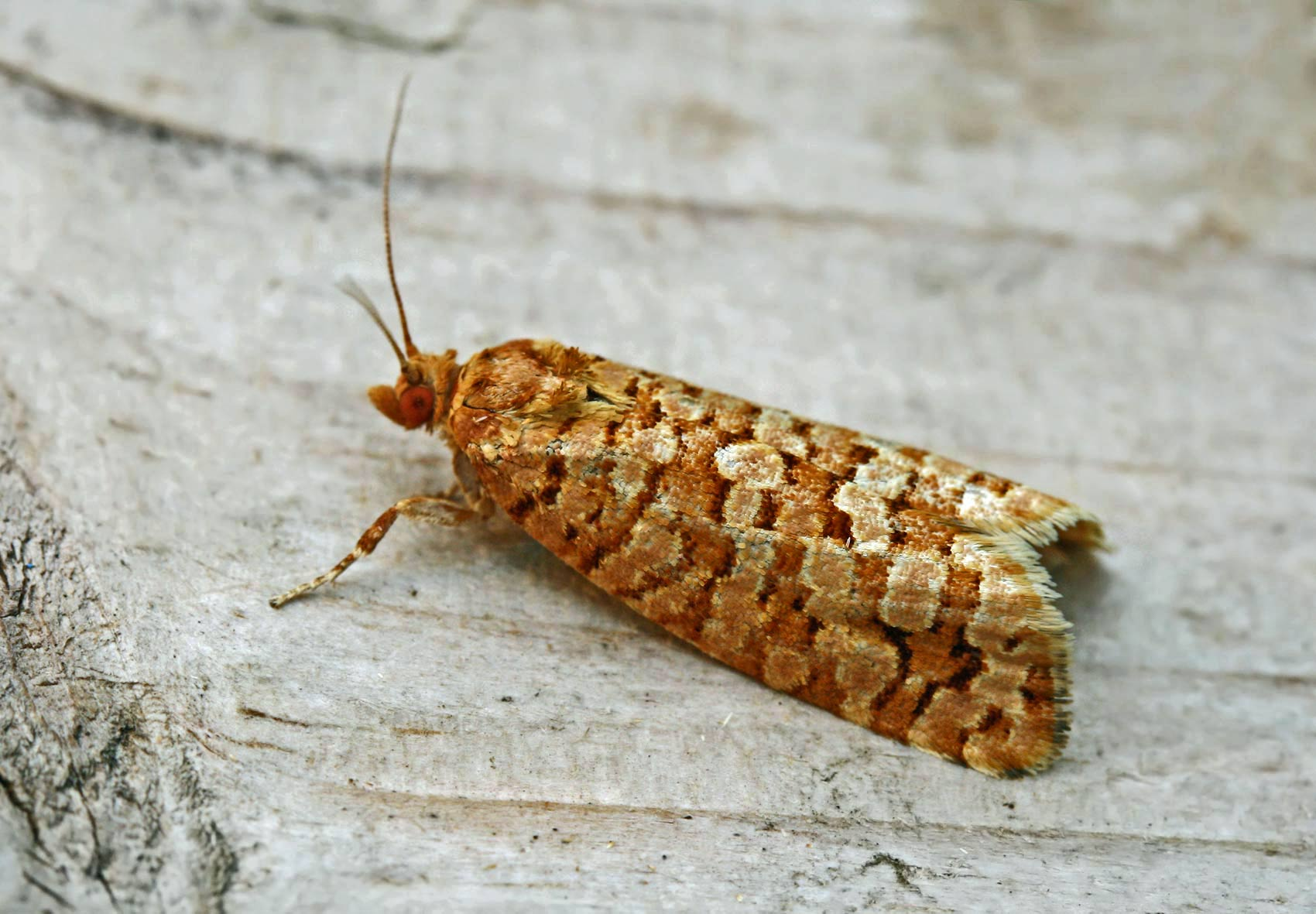
- Lozotaeniodes formosana

Scientific classification
- Domain: Eukaryota
- Kingdom: Animalia
- Phylum: Arthropoda
- Class: Insecta
- Order: Lepidoptera
- Family: Tortricidae
- Tribe: Archipini
- Genus: Lozotaeniodes; Obraztsov, 1954

= Lozotaeniodes =

Genus of tortrix moths

Lozotaeniodes is a genus of moths in the tribe Archipini.

== Species ==
- Lozotaeniodes brusseauxi (Gibeaux, 1999)
- Lozotaeniodes cupressana (Duponchel, in Godart, 1836)
- Lozotaeniodes formosana (Frolich, in Geyer & Hübner, 1830)

== See also ==
- List of Tortricidae genera
