= Lozotaeniodes brusseauxi =

Scientific classification
- Domain: Eukaryota
- Kingdom: Animalia
- Phylum: Arthropoda
- Class: Insecta
- Order: Lepidoptera
- Family: Tortricidae
- Genus: Lozotaeniodes
- Species: L. brusseauxi

Binomial name
- Lozotaeniodes brusseauxi (Gibeaux, 1999)

Synonyms
- Lozotaenia brusseauxi Gibeaux, 1999

Species of moth

Lozotaeniodes brusseauxi is a species of moth of the family Tortricidae. It is found on Corsica.

The wingspan is about 25 mm. Adults are on wing in July.
