= Leistus darvazicus =

Scientific classification
- Domain: Eukaryota
- Kingdom: Animalia
- Phylum: Arthropoda
- Class: Insecta
- Order: Coleoptera
- Suborder: Adephaga
- Family: Carabidae
- Genus: Leistus
- Species: L. darvazicus

Binomial name
- Leistus darvazicus Kabak, 2000

Species of beetle

Leistus darvazicus is a species of ground beetle that can be found in the Darvazskiy Mountain Range, Tajikistan. It belongs to the subgenus Pogonophorus.

Only one specimen, a male, is known and was described in the year 2000. The specimen is stored in the Zoological Institute of Russian Academy of Sciences.

== Description ==
Leistus darvazicus is black with a somewhat heart-shaped pronotum. The antennae are quite long. The mandibles are conspicuously wide.

== Distribution ==
Leistus darvazicus is only found in the Darvazskiy Mountain Range and is associated with Acer. It has been found at elevations of 1400–1600 m (4600–5250 ft) asl.
