= Dichelia alexiana =

Scientific classification
- Domain: Eukaryota
- Kingdom: Animalia
- Phylum: Arthropoda
- Class: Insecta
- Order: Lepidoptera
- Family: Tortricidae
- Genus: Dichelia
- Species: D. alexiana

Binomial name
- Dichelia alexiana (Kennel, 1919)

Synonyms
- Cacoecia alexiana Kennel, 1919

Species of moth

Dichelia alexiana is a species of moth of the family Tortricidae. It is found in Turkey, where it is only known from Hatay Province.
