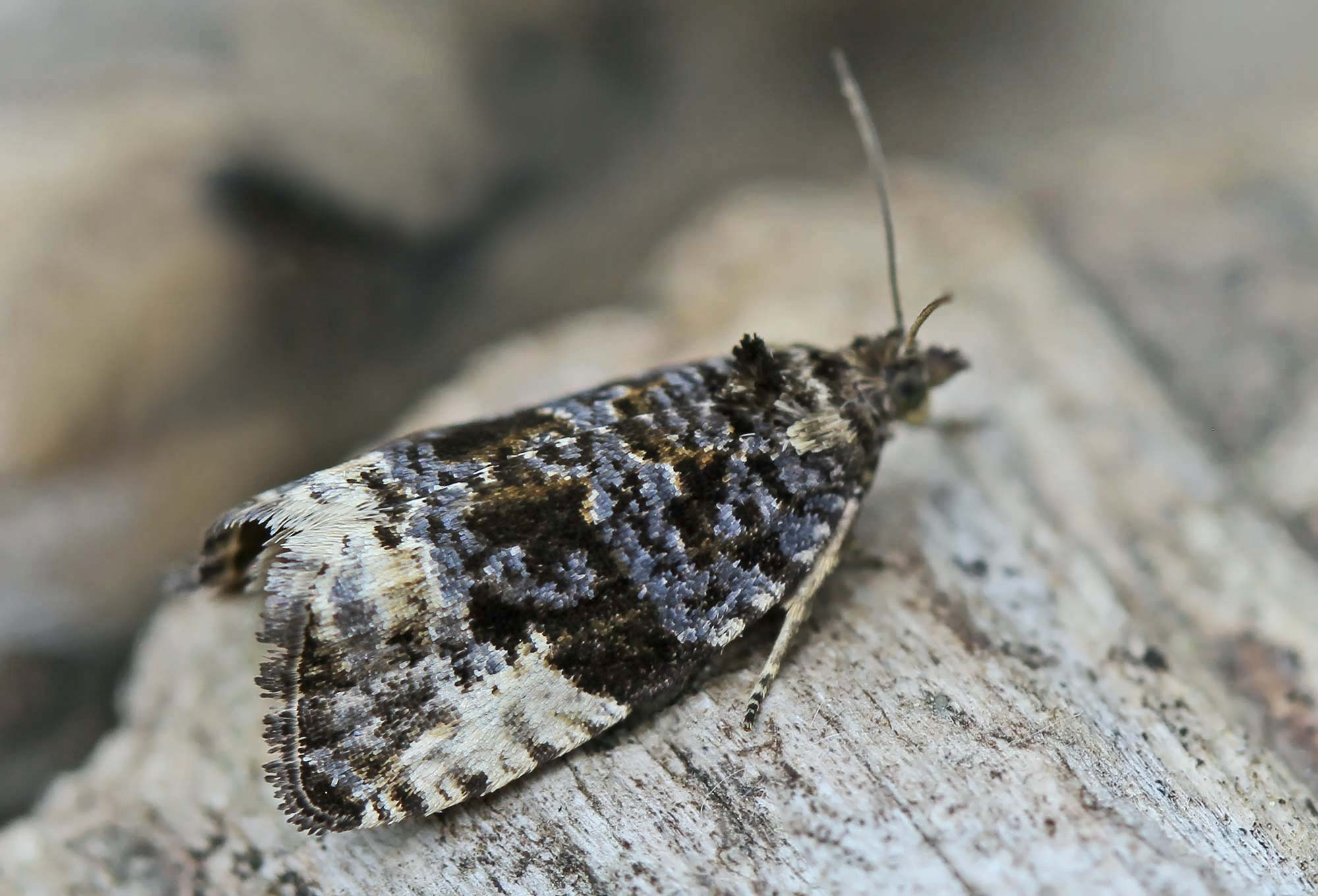

Scientific classification
- Kingdom: Animalia
- Phylum: Arthropoda
- Clade: Pancrustacea
- Class: Insecta
- Order: Lepidoptera
- Family: Tortricidae
- Genus: Hedya
- Species: H. pruniana

Binomial name
- Hedya pruniana (Hübner, 1799)

Synonyms
- Tortrix pruniana Hubner, [1796-1799]; Penthina pruneticolana Zeller, 1849; Tortrix (Penthina) roseomaculana Herrich-Schaffer, 1851

= Hedya pruniana =

Species of moth

Hedya pruniana, the plum tortrix, is a species of moth of the family Tortricidae. It is found in the Palearctic realm. In central Europe, it is a common species. In the east, the range extends through Anatolia and Iran, the Ural, Transcaucasia and western Kazakhstan to the Far East.

The wingspan is 15–19 mm.The forewings are white, sometimes partly ochreous-tinged, more or less strigulated posteriorly with dark fuscous. The basal patch, central fascia, and included space are dark brown mixed with dark ashy-fuscous and blackish, somewhat whitish-sprinkled, especially in the space on costa and fold.The posterior edge of the fascia has an angular prominence in middle, sometimes followed by one or two dark dots. There isa greyish subterminal streak and the extreme apex is blackish-fuscous. The hindwings are grey, darker in the female . The larva is bright green; tubercular spots, head, and plate of two black.

Adults are on wing from May to August.

The larvae feed on various plant, including Prunus spinosa, Crataegus, Rosa, Sorbus and Corylus avellana. The larvae can be found from July/August to April/May. The species overwinters in the larval stage.
