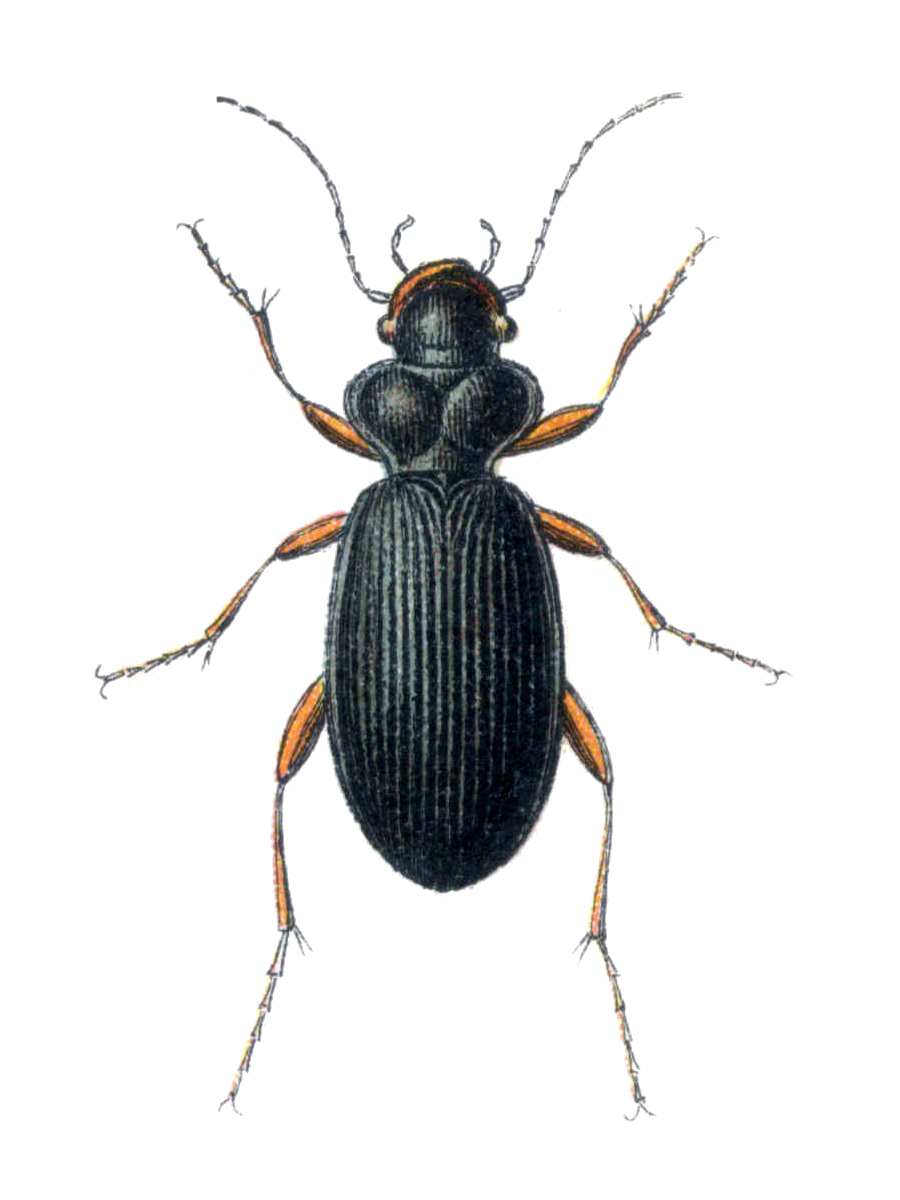

Scientific classification
- Kingdom: Animalia
- Phylum: Arthropoda
- Class: Insecta
- Order: Coleoptera
- Suborder: Adephaga
- Family: Carabidae
- Genus: Leistus
- Species: L. fulvibarbis

Binomial name
- Leistus fulvibarbis Dejean, 1826

= Leistus fulvibarbis =

Species of beetle

Leistus fulvibarbis is a species of ground beetle of the subfamily of Nebriinae. The nominative subspecies is distributed in Europe, Asia Minor and North Africa; L. f. danieli is found in Italy. The body length of an adult is 6.5–8 millimetres (0.26–0.31 in). The beetle is black colored, with blue metallic shiny elytra. Appendages are reddish-yellow.

== Biology ==
It seems to prefer moist and shady areas in deciduous forests on calcareous soil, but is also found on sandy forest soil. It has quickly expanded north in recent years after having spread to the area around Bremerhaven, which contains one of Europe's largest seaports.
