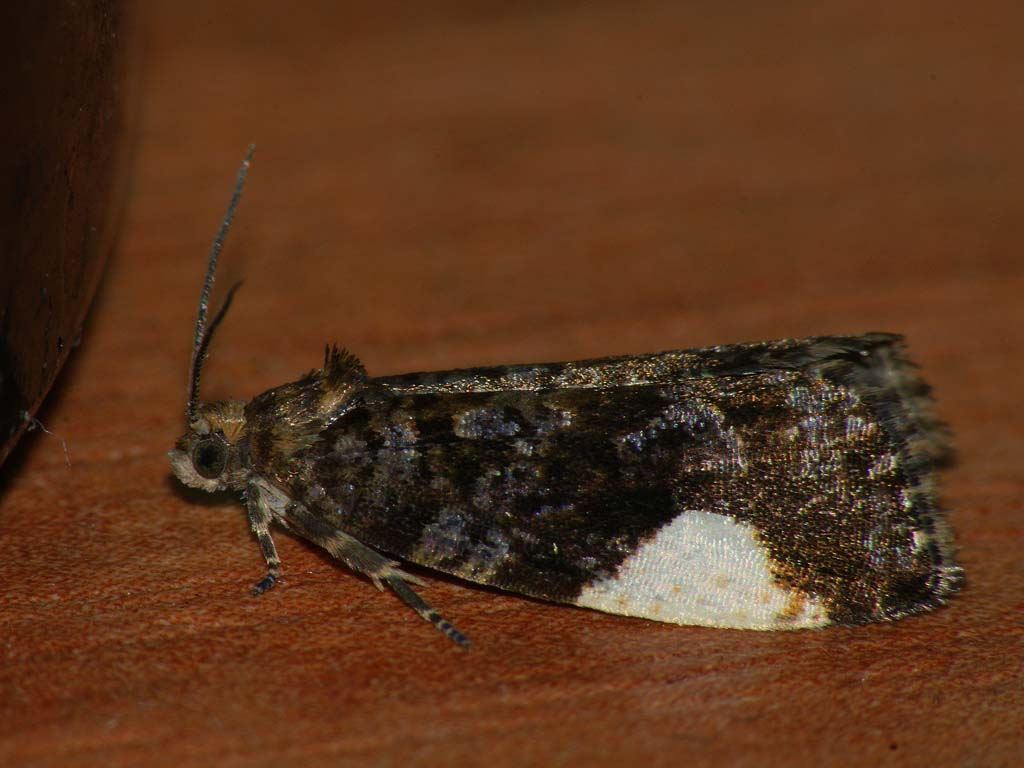

Scientific classification
- Domain: Eukaryota
- Kingdom: Animalia
- Phylum: Arthropoda
- Class: Insecta
- Order: Lepidoptera
- Family: Tortricidae
- Genus: Hedya
- Species: H. dimidiana

Binomial name
- Hedya dimidiana (Clerck, 1759)

Synonyms
- Phalaena dimidiana Clerck, 1759; Phalaena (Tortrix) schraeberiana Linnaeus, 1767; Phalaena (Tortrix) schreberiana Linnaeus, 1761; Paedisca scraeberiana Duponchel, in Godart, 1836; Phalaena screberiana Clerck, 1764

= Hedya dimidiana =

Species of moth

Hedya dimidiana is a moth of the family Tortricidae. It was described by Carl Alexander Clerck in 1759. It is found from most of Europe, through Russia to Japan. It has also been recorded from Vietnam.

The wingspan is 14–18 mm. Adults have been recorded on wing from June to July.

The larvae have been recorded feeding on Prunus padus, Prunus avium, Prunus cerasus, Prunus armeniaca and Sorbus species. Larvae can be found from August to April.
