= Leistus rezabkovae =

Scientific classification
- Kingdom: Animalia
- Phylum: Arthropoda
- Class: Insecta
- Order: Coleoptera
- Suborder: Adephaga
- Family: Carabidae
- Genus: Leistus
- Species: L. rezabkovae

Binomial name
- Leistus rezabkovae Farkač & Wrase, 2015

Species of beetle

Leistus rezabkovae is a species of ground beetle found in the Gansu Province, China. It belongs to the subgenus Evanoleistus.

== Description ==
It is entirely black and has a rather slim, somewhat heart-shaped pronotum. It has conspicuously wide mandibles. It is very similar to the species L. farkaci.

== Distribution and ecology ==
It has only been found in the Lenglong Ling Mountains, confined to the Gansu Province. It has been found in rocky alpine pastures. It is associated with plants of Rhododendron and Azalea. It may be found by searching under rocks or by sifting through litter and moss. Specimens were collected at altitudes between 3,392 and 3,900 m (11,130 and 12,800 ft).

== Etymology ==
The specific epithet is a tribute to Klára Řežábková, a friend of the first author, Jan Farkač.
