= Dichelia numidicola =

Scientific classification
- Domain: Eukaryota
- Kingdom: Animalia
- Phylum: Arthropoda
- Class: Insecta
- Order: Lepidoptera
- Family: Tortricidae
- Genus: Dichelia
- Species: D. numidicola

Binomial name
- Dichelia numidicola Chambon, in Chambon, Fabre & Khemeci, 1990

Species of moth

Dichelia numidicola is a species of moth of the family Tortricidae. It is found in Algeria.

The larvae feed on Abies numidica.
