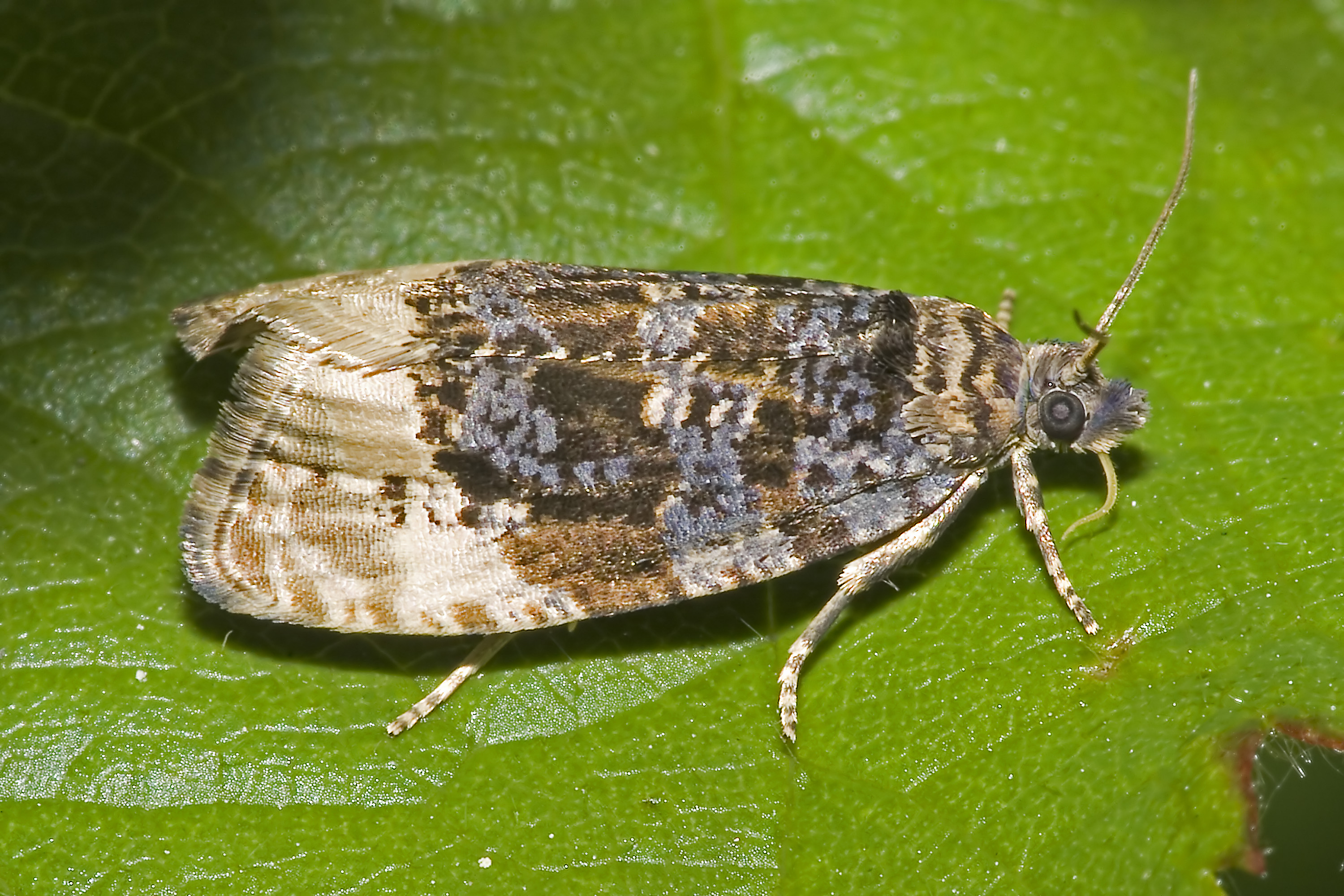

Scientific classification
- Domain: Eukaryota
- Kingdom: Animalia
- Phylum: Arthropoda
- Class: Insecta
- Order: Lepidoptera
- Family: Tortricidae
- Genus: Hedya
- Species: H. nubiferana

Binomial name
- Hedya nubiferana Haworth, 1811

= Hedya nubiferana =

Species of moth

Hedya nubiferana, the marbled orchard tortrix or green budworm moth, is a moth of the family Tortricidae. It is found in the Palearctic and Nearctic realms.

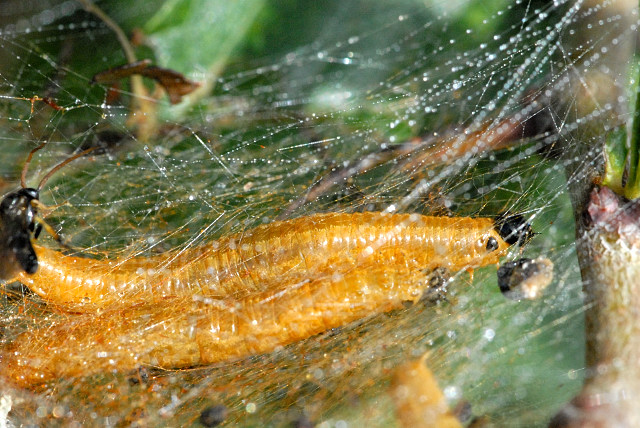
Caterpillar

The wingspan is 15–21 mm. The forewing ground colour is grey-brown.There is a square, basal black spot, and just distal to this a more or less clear, light-grey cross-band. At the wing tip there is a wide, snow-white cross-band (similar to the white uric acid in bird excrement). The hindwings are thinly shelled, light grey-brown with brown veins.

The moth flies from May to August.

The larvae feed on hawthorn (Crataegus species) and blackthorn (Prunus spinosa).

== Notes ==
1. The flight season refers to Belgium and the Netherlands. This may vary in other parts of the range.
