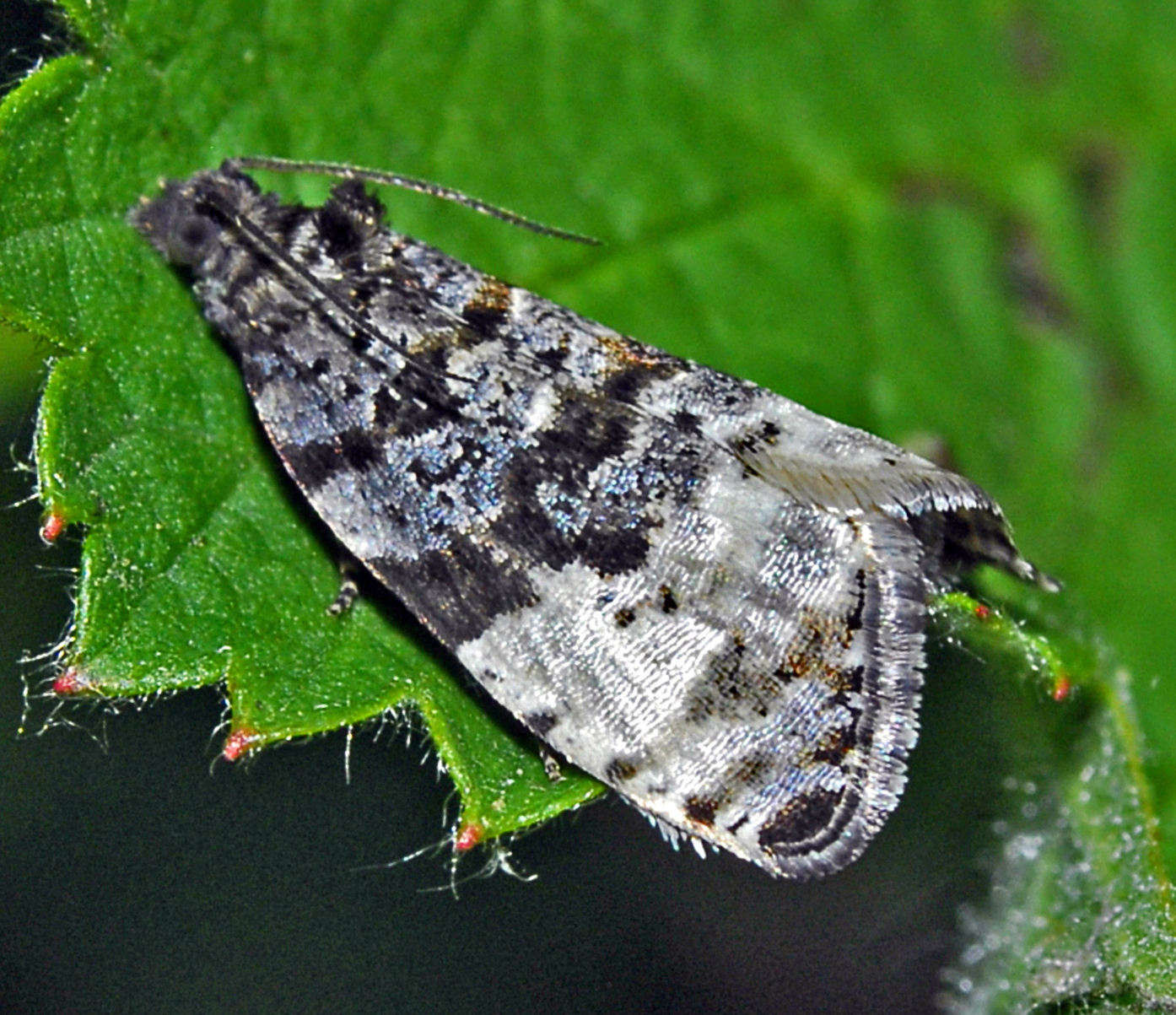
- Hedya pruniana

Scientific classification
- Domain: Eukaryota
- Kingdom: Animalia
- Phylum: Arthropoda
- Class: Insecta
- Order: Lepidoptera
- Family: Tortricidae
- Tribe: Olethreutini
- Genus: Hedya; Hübner, [1825]

Synonyms
- Episagma Hübner, 1825; Pendina Treitschke, 1829; Penthina Treitschke, 1830

= Hedya =

Genus of tortrix moths

Hedya is a genus of moths belonging to the subfamily Olethreutinae of the family Tortricidae.

== Species ==
- Hedya abjecta Falkovitsh, 1962
- Hedya anaplecta (Meyrick, 1909)
- Hedya atrifraga Diakonoff, 1968
- Hedya auricristana (Walsingham, 1900)
- Hedya caucasicana (Kennel, 1900)
- Hedya chionosema (Zeller, 1875)
- Hedya corni Oku, 1974
- Hedya cyanana (Murtfeldt, 1880)
- Hedya daeduchus Diakonoff, 1973
- Hedya designata (Kuznetzov, 1970)
- Hedya dimidiana (Clerck, 1759)
- Hedya ebenina (Meyrick, 1916)
- Hedya exsignata (Meyrick, 1916)
- Hedya fibrata (Meyrick, 1909)
- Hedya gratiana Kawabe, 1974
- Hedya ignara Falkovitsh, 1962
- Hedya inornata (Walsingham, 1900)
- Hedya iophaea (Meyrick, 1912)
- Hedya kurokoi Kawabe, 1995
- Hedya leucalox Diakonoff, 1973
- Hedya nubiferana (Haworth, [1811])
- Hedya ochroleucana (Frolich, 1828)
- Hedya perspicuana (Kennel, 1901)
- Hedya pruniana (Hubner, [1796-1799])
- Hedya salicella (Linnaeus, 1758)
- Hedya semiassana (Kennel, 1901)
- Hedya simulans Oku, 2005
- Hedya sunmoonlakensis Kawabe, 1993
- Hedya tsushimaensis Kawabe, 1978
- Hedya vicinana (Ragonot, 1894)
- Hedya walsinghami Oku, 1974
- Hedya zoyphium Razowski & Wojtusiak, 2011

== See also ==
- List of Tortricidae genera
