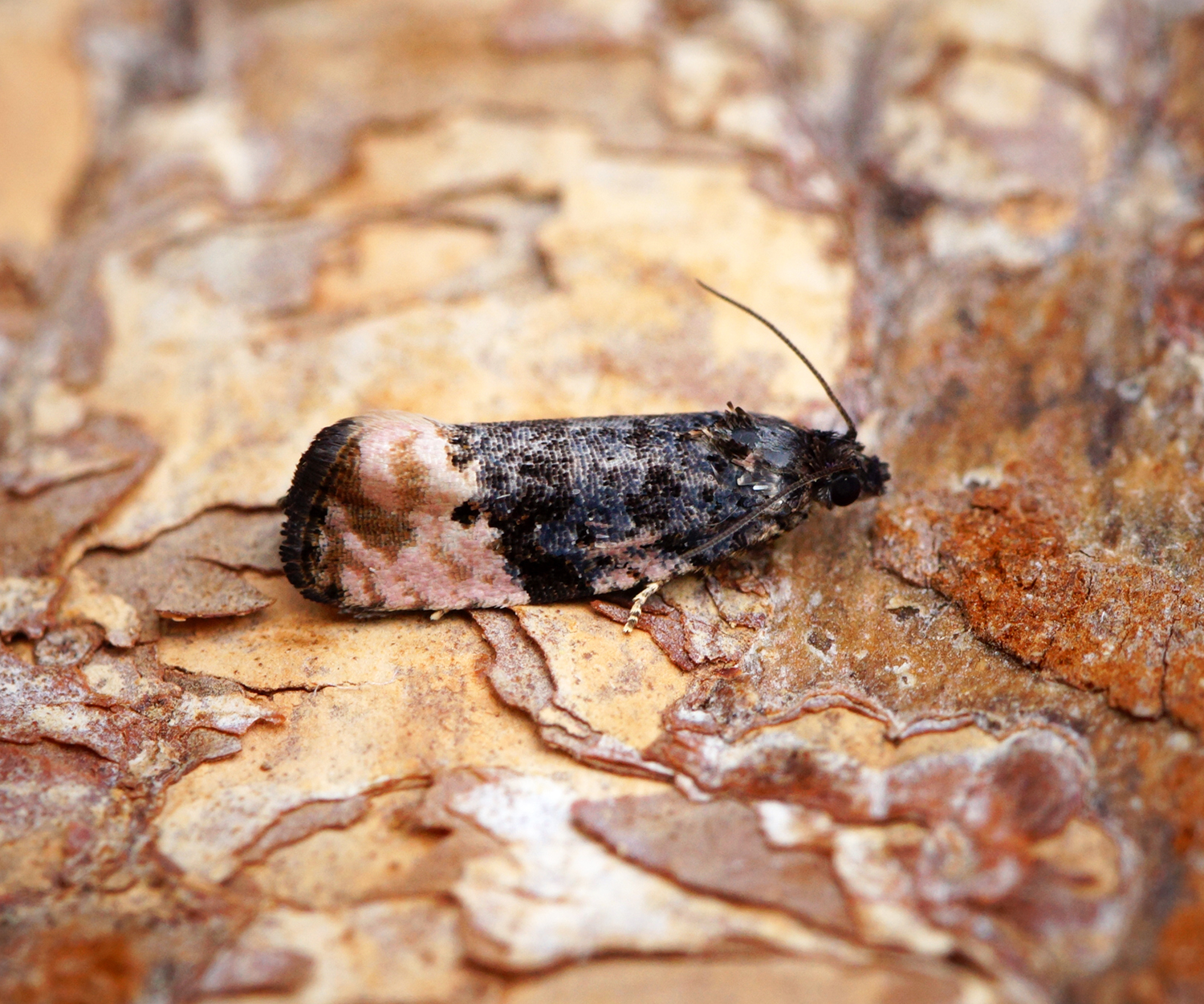
- Metendothenia atropunctana

Scientific classification
- Kingdom: Animalia
- Phylum: Arthropoda
- Class: Insecta
- Order: Lepidoptera
- Family: Tortricidae
- Subfamily: Olethreutinae
- Tribe: Olethreutini
- Genus: Metendothenia; Diakonoff, 1973

= Metendothenia =

Genus of tortrix moths

Metendothenia is a genus of moths belonging to the subfamily Olethreutinae of the family Tortricidae.

== Species ==
- Metendothenia albomaculata Kawabe, 1989
- Metendothenia atropunctana (Zetterstedt, 1839)
- Metendothenia balanacma (Meyrick, 1914)
- Metendothenia calopa Diakonoff, 1973
- Metendothenia emmilta Diakonoff, 1973
- Metendothenia fidelis Diakonoff, 1973
- Metendothenia fulvoflua Diakonoff, 1983
- Metendothenia heterophenga Diakonoff, 1992
- Metendothenia hilarocroca Diakonoff, 1973
- Metendothenia inouei Kawabe, 1987
- Metendothenia mesarotra (Meyrick, 1911)
- Metendothenia ogasawarensis Kawabe & Kusui, 1978
- Metendothenia plecta Diakonoff, 1983
- Metendothenia pulchra Kawabe, 1989
- Metendothenia rhodambon Diakonoff, 1973
- Metendothenia separatana (Kearfott, 1907)

== See also ==
- List of Tortricidae genera
