= Josef Aloys Frölich =

German doctor, botanist and entomologist (1766–1841)

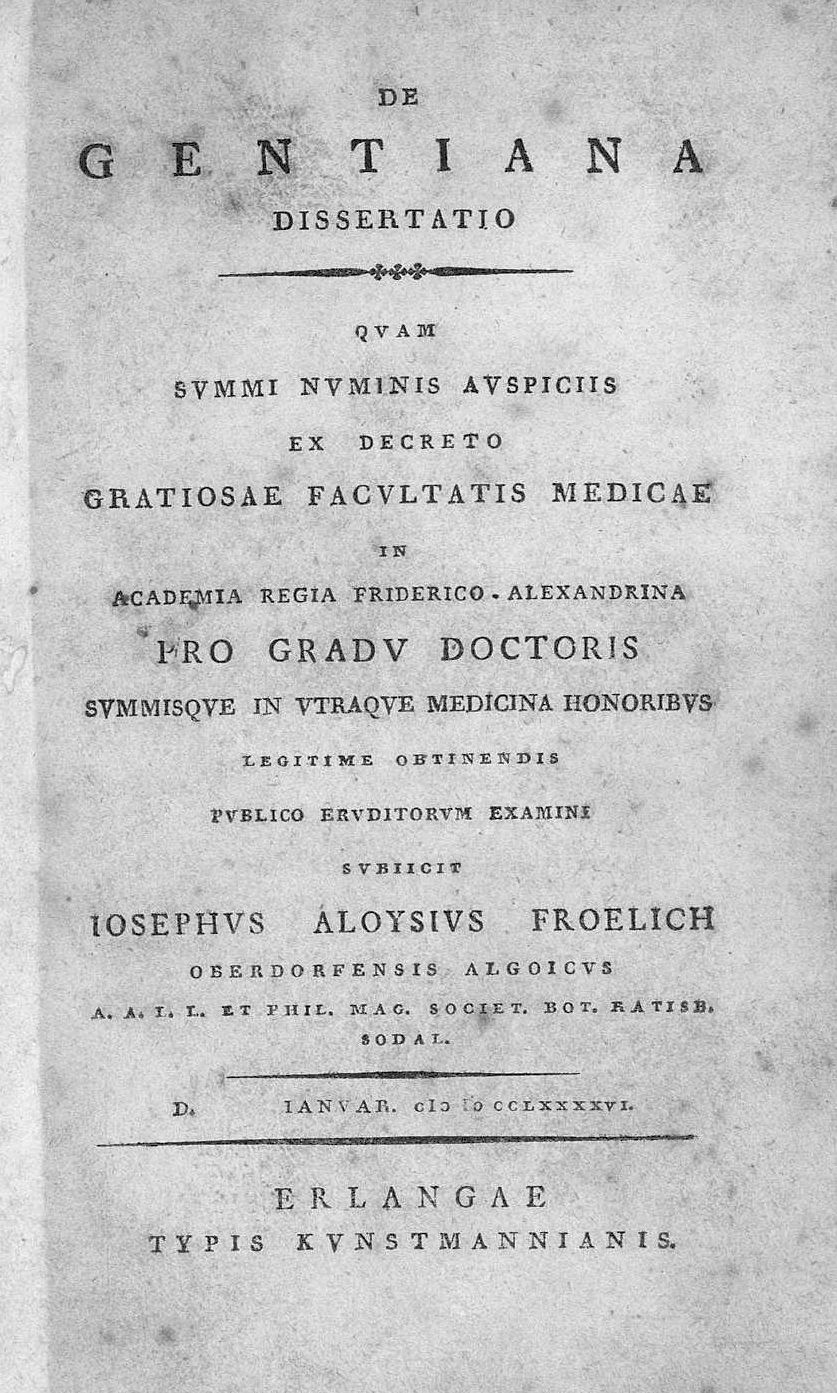
De gentiana dissertatio, 1796

Josef Aloys Frölich or Alois von Frölich (10 March 1766, Marktoberdorf – 11 March 1841) was a German medical doctor, botanist and entomologist. He is not to be confused with Franz Anton Gottfried Frölich (1805–1878), his son, also an entomologist but specialising in Lepidoptera.

In the field of botany he described many species within the genus Hieracium. The genus Froelichia (family Amaranthaceae) is named in his honor.

== Works ==
- De Gentiana libellus sistens specierum cognitarum descriptiones cum observationibus. Accedit tabula aenea Erlangen: Walther, 1796 [Titel auch: De Gentiana, Erlangen: Kunstmann; De gentiana dissertatio; Dissertatio inauguralis de Gentiana], zugleich: Erlangen, Med. Diss., January 1796
- Beschreibungen einiger neuer Eingeweidewürmer, in: Der Naturforscher, 24, S. 101–162, Halle, 1789
- Bemerkungen über einige seltene Käfer aus der Insektensammlung des Herrn Hofr. und Prof. Rudolph in Erlangen, in: Der Naturforscher, 26, S. 68–165, Halle, 1792.

== See also ==
- Category:Taxa named by Josef Aloys Frölich
