= Franz Anton Gottfried Frölich =

German entomologist

Franz Anton Gottfried Frölich (26 November 1805 – 1878) was a German entomologist who specialised in Lepidoptera.

Frölichwas born in Ellwangen in 1805. His father, Josef Aloys Frölich, was also an entomologist but specialising in Coleoptera. Franz Anton Gottfried Frölich wrote several supplements to the works of Jacob Hubner — See Francis Hemming, "Hübner: A bibliographical and systematic account of the entomological works of Jacob Hübner, and of the supplements thereto by Carl Geyer, Gottfried Franz von Frölich, and Gottlieb August Wilhelm Herrich-Schäffer". London: Royal Entomological Society of London, 1937. 2 volumes.
