= Calyciphora albodactylus =

Scientific classification
- Kingdom: Animalia
- Phylum: Arthropoda
- Class: Insecta
- Order: Lepidoptera
- Family: Pterophoridae
- Genus: Calyciphora
- Species: C. albodactylus

Binomial name
- Calyciphora albodactylus (Fabricius, 1794)

Synonyms
- Pterophorus albodactylus Fabricius, 1794; Aciptilia siculus Fuchs, 1901; Pterophorus xerodactylus Zeller, 1841

Species of plume moth

Calyciphora albodactylus is a moth of the family Pterophoridae. It is found in most of Europe, except Portugal, the Benelux, Great Britain and Ireland. It is also known from Russia and Anatolia. The species was first described by Johan Christian Fabricius in 1794.

The wingspan is 20–28 mm.

The larvae feed on Arctium lappa, Carlina acanthifolia, Carlina biebersteinii, Carlina vulgaris, Cirsium ferox, Cirsium helenioides, Echinops armatus, Echinops ritro, Echinops sphaerocephalus, Jurinea cyanoides and Serratula.
