= CIISA =

CIISA may refer to:

- CIISA (plant), the EPPO code of Carlina salicifolia
- CIISA (regulator), the Creative Industries Independent Standards Authority, United Kingdom
