= Calyciphora xanthodactyla =

Scientific classification
- Kingdom: Animalia
- Phylum: Arthropoda
- Class: Insecta
- Order: Lepidoptera
- Family: Pterophoridae
- Genus: Calyciphora
- Species: C. xanthodactyla

Binomial name
- Calyciphora xanthodactyla (Treitschke, 1833)

Synonyms
- Alucita xanthodactyla Treitschke, 1833; Aciptilia klimeschi Kasy, 1960

Species of plume moth

Calyciphora xanthodactyla is a moth of the family Pterophoridae. It is found in Slovakia, Hungary, Romania, Bulgaria and North Macedonia. It has also been recorded from Morocco and Turkey.

The larvae feed on Jurinea mollis and Carlina biebersteinii. They can be found from May to June.
