= Calyciphora homoiodactyla =

Scientific classification
- Kingdom: Animalia
- Phylum: Arthropoda
- Class: Insecta
- Order: Lepidoptera
- Family: Pterophoridae
- Genus: Calyciphora
- Species: C. homoiodactyla

Binomial name
- Calyciphora homoiodactyla (Kasy, 1960)

Synonyms
- Aciptilia homoiodactyla Kasy, 1960

Species of plume moth

Calyciphora homoiodactyla is a moth of the family Pterophoridae. It is found in France, the Czech Republic, Croatia, Bulgaria, Greece, Russia and Asia Minor.

The larvae feed on Echinops species, including southern globethistle (Echinops ritro).
