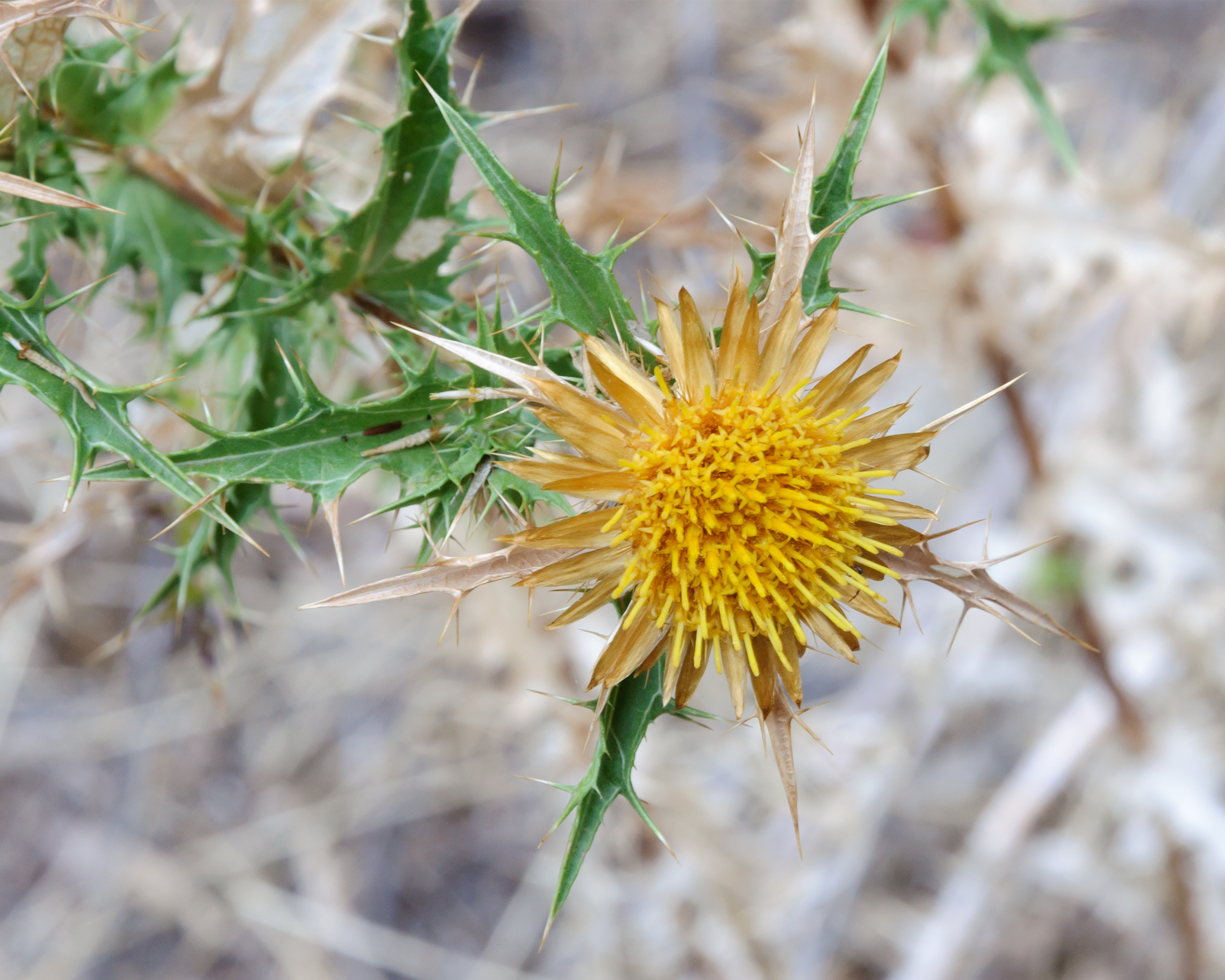

Scientific classification
- Kingdom: Plantae
- Clade: Tracheophytes
- Clade: Angiosperms
- Clade: Eudicots
- Clade: Asterids
- Order: Asterales
- Family: Asteraceae
- Genus: Carlina
- Species: C. corymbosa

Binomial name
- Carlina corymbosa L.

Synonyms
- Carlina curetum Halácsy

= Carlina corymbosa =

Species of flowering plant

Carlina corymbosa, common name clustered carline thistle, is a herbaceous perennial plant in the genus Carlina, belonging to the family Asteraceae.

== Description ==
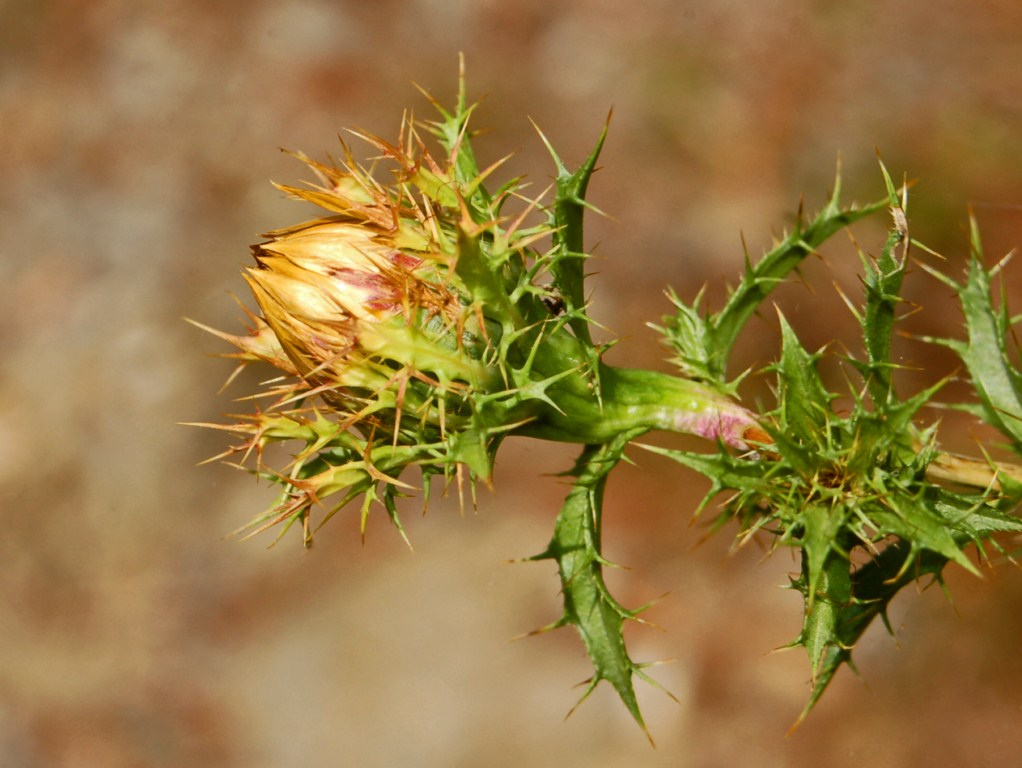
Flower of Carlina corymbosa

Carlina corymbosa reaches on average 10–90 centimetres (4–35 in) in height. This plant has rhizomatous roots, overwintering buds situated just below the soil surface (hemicryptophyte) and an almost leafless stalk growing directly from the ground (scapose). The stem is green to whitish, thick and erect. The leaves are alternate, sessile or amplexicaul and lobed with spines on the margins.

The yellow flowers are terminal, 2.0–3.5 cm (0.8–1.4 in) in diameter and surrounded by thorny bracts. The outer bracts are similar to leaves, while the inner bracts surrounding the disk florets are membranous and stiff, with a golden color. The flowering period extends from June through August. The flowers are hermaphrodite and are pollinated by insects (usually bees, wasps and butterflies) (entomogamy). The fruits are achenes 2.5 millimetres (0.1 in) long, each with a feathery yellow pappus. Seed dispersal is by wind (anemochory).

== Distribution ==
This plant is native to the Mediterranean and it is present in Albania, Balearic Islands, Bulgaria, Corsica, Crete, France, Greece, Spain, Italy, former Jugoslavia, Sardinia, Sicily and Turkey.

== Habitat ==
It grows in sunny, sandy or rocky lands, in grassland soils, on roadside, in fallow lands and in dry places, at an altitude of 0–1,200 metres (0–3,937 ft) above sea level.
