= Carlina hispanica =

Scientific classification
- Kingdom: Plantae
- Clade: Tracheophytes
- Clade: Angiosperms
- Clade: Eudicots
- Clade: Asterids
- Order: Asterales
- Family: Asteraceae
- Genus: Carlina
- Species: C. hispanica

Binomial name
- Carlina hispanica Lam.

Synonyms
- Carlina corymbosa subsp. hispanica (Lam.) O.Bolòs & Vigo

Species of plant

Carlina hispanica is a species of flowering plant from the genus Carlina. It is native to Algeria, France, Italy, Morocco, Portugal, Sicily, Spain, and Tunisia in the western and central Mediterranean.
