= Calyciphora marashella =

Scientific classification
- Kingdom: Animalia
- Phylum: Arthropoda
- Class: Insecta
- Order: Lepidoptera
- Family: Pterophoridae
- Genus: Calyciphora
- Species: C. marashella

Binomial name
- Calyciphora marashella Zagulajev, 1986

Species of plume moth

Calyciphora marashella is a moth of the family Pterophoridae. It is found in Turkey and Armenia.
