= Calyciphora golestanica =

Scientific classification
- Kingdom: Animalia
- Phylum: Arthropoda
- Class: Insecta
- Order: Lepidoptera
- Family: Pterophoridae
- Genus: Calyciphora
- Species: C. golestanica

Binomial name
- Calyciphora golestanica Alipanah & Ustjuzhanin, 2005

Species of plume moth

Calyciphora golestanica is a moth of the family Pterophoridae. It is found in Golestan, Iran.
