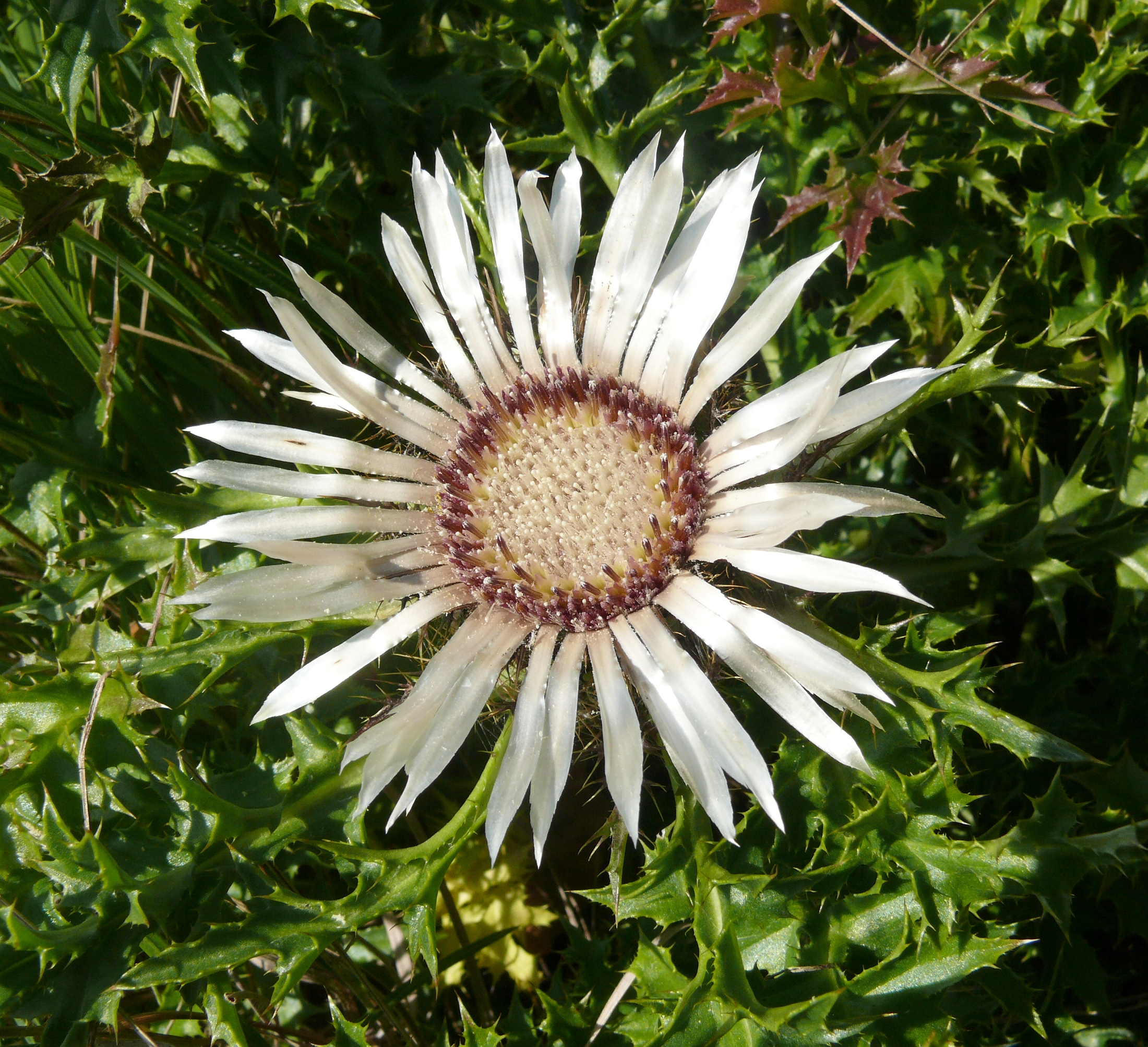

Scientific classification
- Kingdom: Plantae
- Clade: Tracheophytes
- Clade: Angiosperms
- Clade: Eudicots
- Clade: Asterids
- Order: Asterales
- Family: Asteraceae
- Genus: Carlina
- Species: C. acaulis

Binomial name
- Carlina acaulis L.

= Carlina acaulis =

Species of plant

Carlina acaulis, the stemless carline thistle, dwarf carline thistle, or silver thistle, is a perennial dicotyledonous flowering plant in the family Asteraceae, native to alpine regions of central and southern Europe. The specific name acaulis (Neo-Latin for 'without a stem', from Latin caulis 'stem' or 'stalk') and common names are descriptive of the manner in which its flower head rests directly upon a basal leaf rosette. The plant is named after Charlemagne who searched for a treatment against the plague. He dreamed of an angel who told him to shoot an arrow in the sky and see on what plant the arrow would hit. This plant would bring relieve to the plague. The plant the arrow hit was the Carlina acaulis, the roots of the plant were distributed among the population following which the plague diminished.

The spiny, pinnatilobate leaves grow in a basal rosette approximately 20 cm in diameter. The flowers are produced in a large (up to 10 cm) flowerhead of silvery-white ray florets around a central disc. The disc florets are tubular and yellow-brown in colour. To protect the pollen, the head closes in wet weather, a phenomenon folklore holds to presage forthcoming rain. The flowering time is between August and September.

It prefers chalky soils and dry pastures in environments from valleys up to an altitude of 2,800 m.

Subspecies

There are two subspecies:

- Carlina acaulis subsp. acaulis – inflorescences sessile
- Carlina acaulis subsp. simplex – inflorescences with a short stem

== Uses ==
The rhizome contains a number of essential oils, in particular the antibacterial carlina oxide. The root was formerly employed in herbal medicine as a diuretic and cold remedy.

While young, the flowerhead bud can be cooked and eaten in a similar manner to the Globe artichoke, which earned it the nickname of hunter's bread.

It is sometimes cultivated as a rockery plant, or dried and hung as a house decoration.

In Basque culture it was traditionally used as symbol of good fortune, fixed into the frontal door of the house and was given by the goddess Mari.
