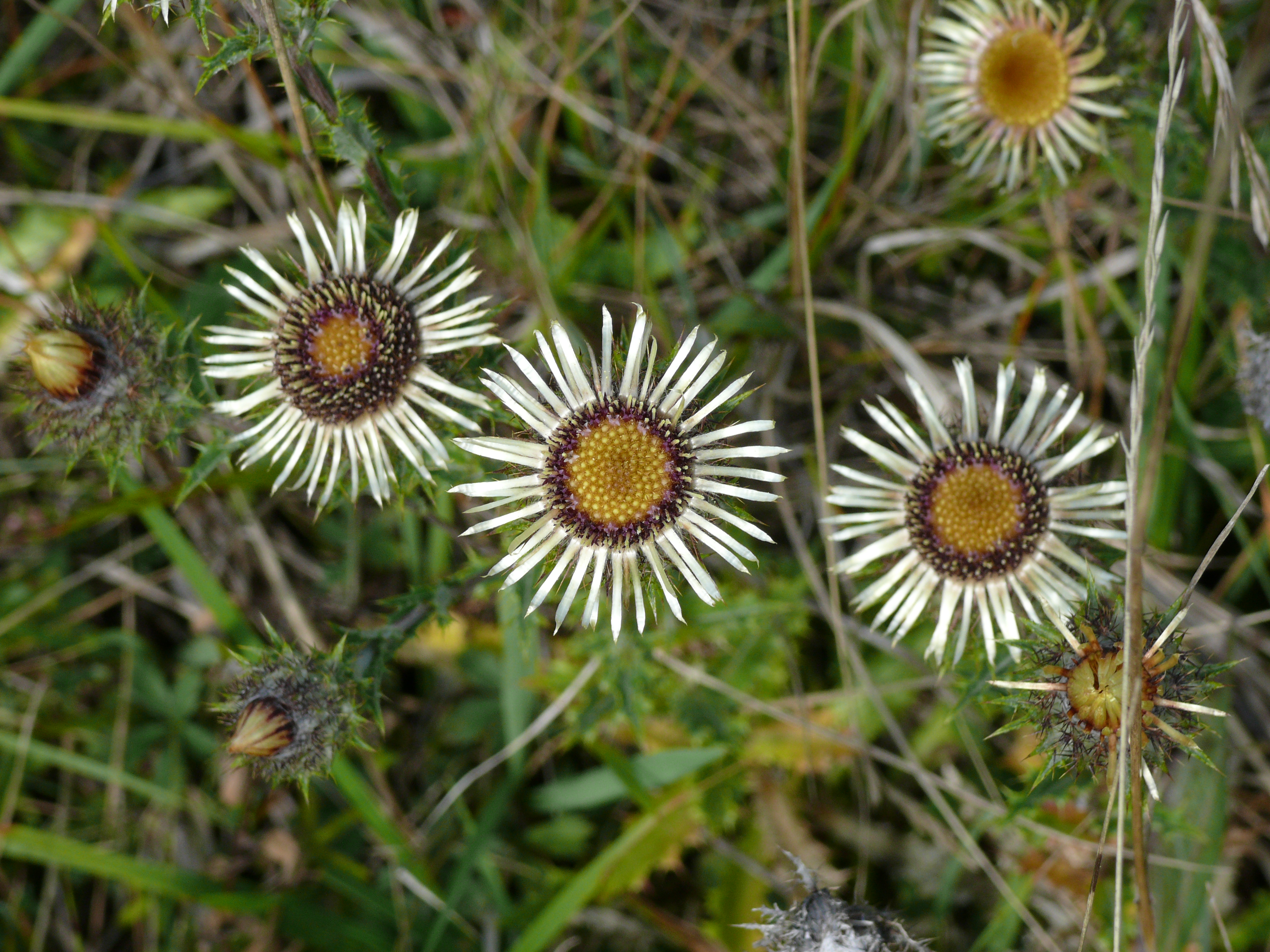
- Carlina vulgaris

Scientific classification
- Kingdom: Plantae
- Clade: Embryophytes
- Clade: Tracheophytes
- Clade: Spermatophytes
- Clade: Angiosperms
- Clade: Eudicots
- Clade: Asterids
- Order: Asterales
- Family: Asteraceae
- Subfamily: Carduoideae
- Tribe: Cardueae
- Subtribe: Carlininae
- Genus: Carlina; L.

Synonyms
- Carlowizia Moench; Chamaeleon Cass.; Chromatolepis Dulac; Lyrolepis Rech.f.

= Carlina =

Genus of flowering plants

Carlina is a genus of flowering plants in the family Asteraceae. It is distributed from Madeira and the Canary Islands across Europe and northern Africa to Siberia and northwestern China.

Plants of the genus are known commonly as carline thistles.

== Description ==
Carlina species are very similar to true thistles (genus Cirsium) in morphology, and are part of the thistle tribe, Cardueae. Most are biennial herbs, but the genus includes annuals, perennials, shrubs, and dwarf trees, as well. The largest reach about 80 centimeters tall. The stems are upright and branching or unbranched. The whole plant is spiny. The leaves have toothed or lobed blades with spiny edges and sometimes woolly hairs. The flower heads are solitary or borne in inflorescences. The head is hemispherical to bell-shaped and lined with several layers of spiny phyllaries. The outer phyllaries may be very long and leaflike. It contains tubular or funnel-shaped disc florets in shades of yellow or red. The fruit is a hairy cypsela with a plumelike pappus made up of tufts of bristles.

== Taxonomy and relationships ==
Carlina is closely related to the genus Atractylis. Together they are a sister group to the genus Atractylodes in the subtribe Carlininae. Carlina has been divided into five subgenera: Carlina, Carlowizia, Heracantha, Lyrolepis, and Mitina.

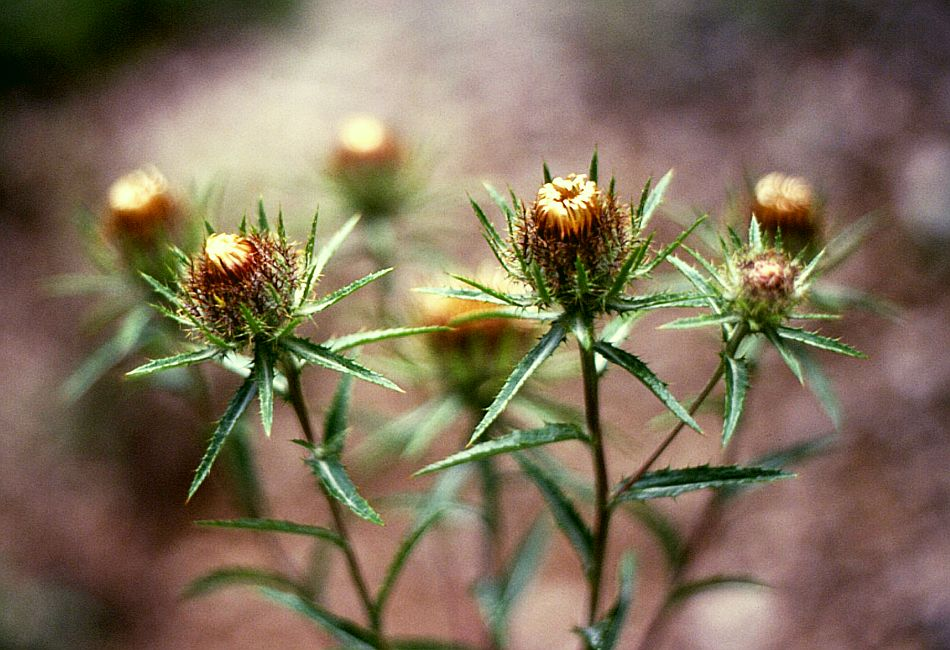
Carlina biebersteinii

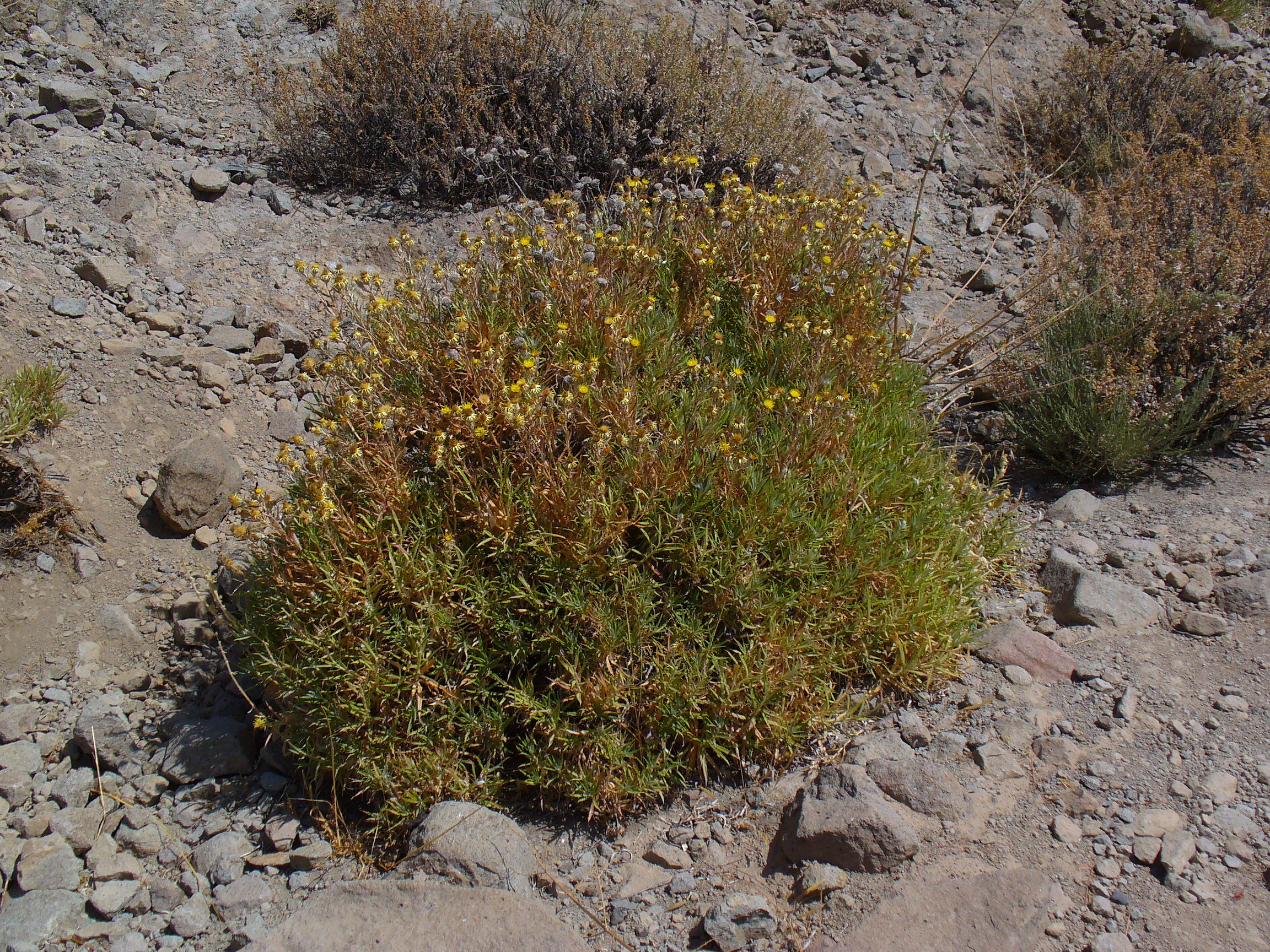
Carlina canariensis

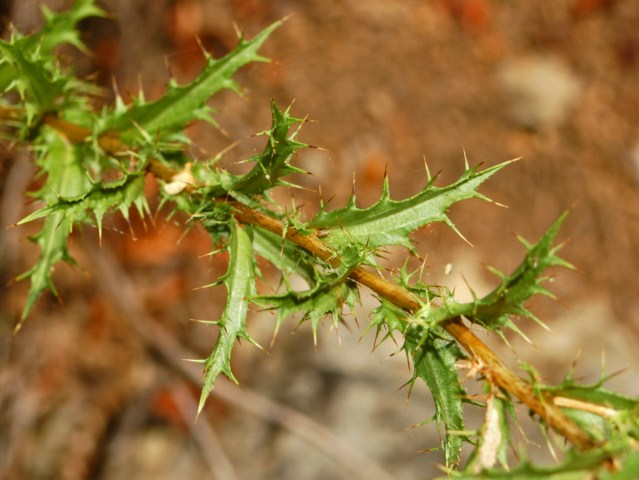
Carlina corymbosa

There are about 28 to 34 species in the genus.

- Carlina acanthifolia
- Carlina acaulis – stemless carline thistle
- Carlina atlantica
- Carlina balfouris
- Carlina barnebiana
- Carlina biebersteinii
- Carlina brachylepis
- Carlina canariensis
- Carlina comosa
- Carlina corymbosa (syn. C. curetum) – clustered carline thistle
- Carlina curetum
- Carlina diae
- Carlina frigida
- Carlina graeca
- Carlina guittonneaui
- Carlina gummifera – stemless atractylis
- Carlina hispanica
- Carlina involucrata
- Carlina kurdica
- Carlina lanata – wooly carline thistle
- Carlina libanotica
- Carlina macrocephala
- Carlina macrophylla
- Carlina nebrodensis
- Carlina oligocephala
- Carlina pygmaea
- Carlina racemosa
- Carlina salicifolia
- Carlina sicula – Sicilian carline thistle
- Carlina sitiensis
- Carlina tragacanthifolia
- Carlina vayredrae
- Carlina vulgaris – common carline thistle
- Carlina xeranthemoides

=== Etymology ===
The genus name honors Charlemagne (748–814). According to a legend, he was instructed by an angel to fire an arrow. The plant in which it landed would be a remedy for the bubonic plague. After shooting an arrow it landed in a specimen of Carlina acaulis.

== Uses ==
Carlina species have been used as herbal remedies in European systems of traditional medicine. C. acaulis root is known as Carlinae radix and is still used medicinally as a diuretic and a treatment for such conditions as skin lesions and rashes, catarrh, and toothache. Most commercial preparations of Carlinae radix are not C. acaulis, but are in fact adulterated with C. acanthifolia, a related species. The essential oil of both species is mostly composed of carlina oxide, an acetylene derivative. The compound has antimicrobial activity. The young flowerhead of C. acaulis is also eaten like an artichoke.
