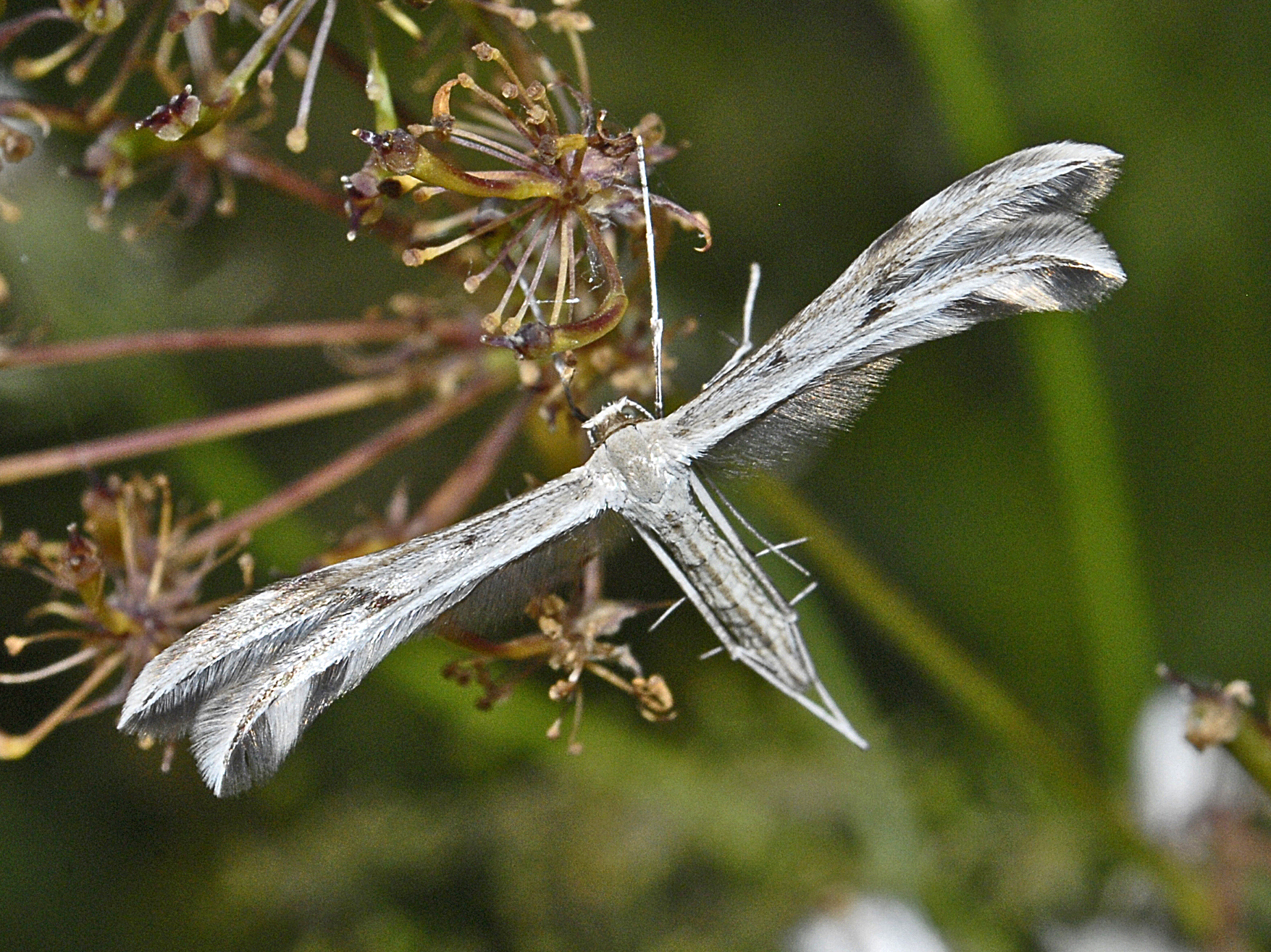

Scientific classification
- Kingdom: Animalia
- Phylum: Arthropoda
- Clade: Pancrustacea
- Class: Insecta
- Order: Lepidoptera
- Family: Pterophoridae
- Genus: Calyciphora
- Species: C. nephelodactyla

Binomial name
- Calyciphora nephelodactyla (Eversmann, 1844)

Synonyms
- Alucita nephelodactyla Eversmann, 1844; Aciptilia apollina Millière, 1883

= Calyciphora nephelodactyla =

Species of plume moth

Calyciphora nephelodactyla is a plume moth of the family Pterophoridae.

== Distribution ==
This species can be found in Spain, France, Switzerland, Italy, Austria, the Czech Republic, Slovakia, Poland, Hungary, Serbia and Montenegro, Bosnia and Herzegovina, Bulgaria, North Macedonia, Greece, Russia and Anatolia.

== Description ==
The wingspan is 21–24 mm.

== Biology ==
Adults fly on July and August. Larvae feed on Cirsium eriophorum.
