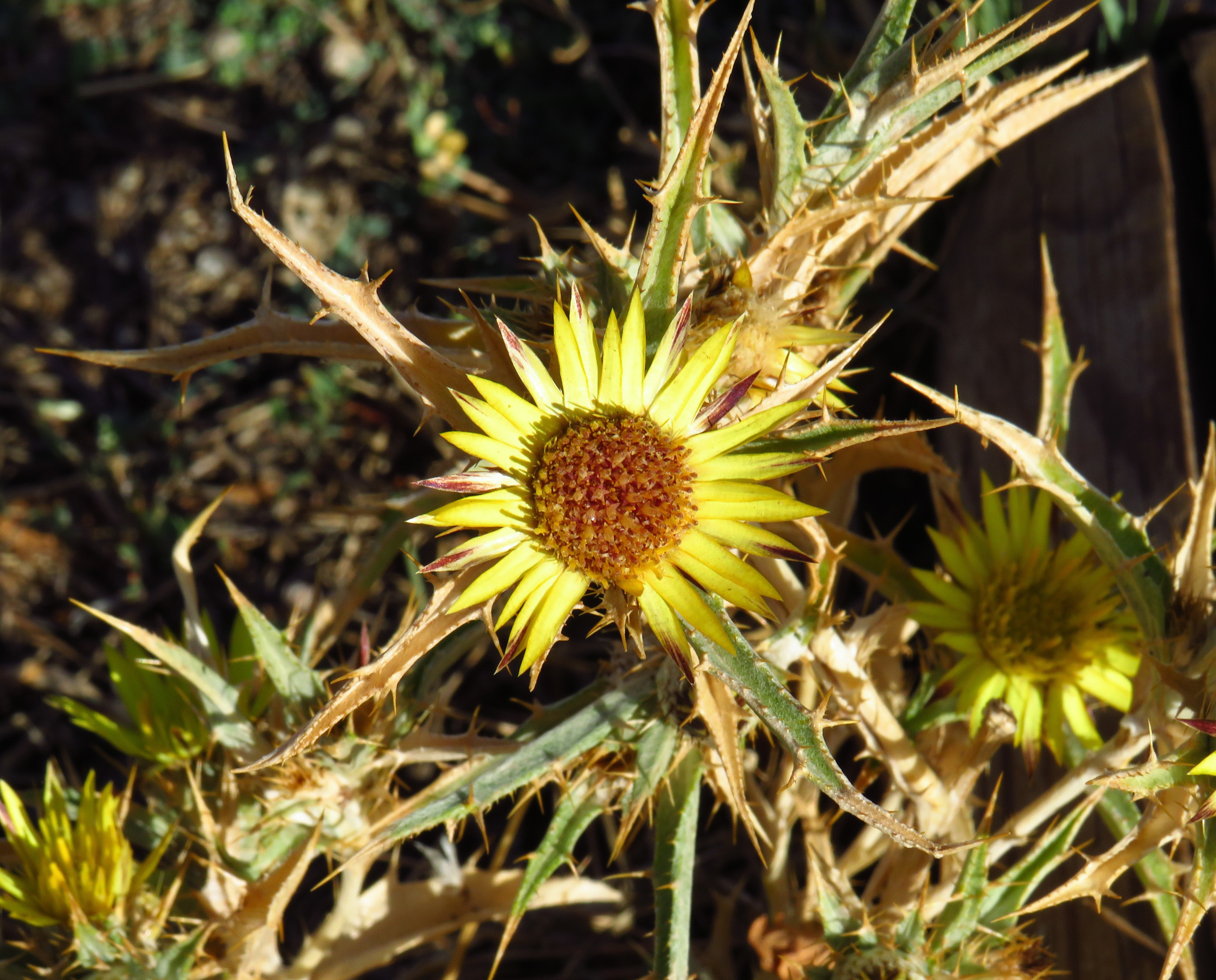

Scientific classification
- Kingdom: Plantae
- Clade: Tracheophytes
- Clade: Angiosperms
- Clade: Eudicots
- Clade: Asterids
- Order: Asterales
- Family: Asteraceae
- Genus: Carlina
- Species: C. racemosa

Binomial name
- Carlina racemosa L.

Synonyms
- Carlina reboudiana Pomel; Carlina subfusca Nyman; Carlina sulphurea Desf.; Mitina sulphurea (Desf.) Cass.

= Carlina racemosa =

Species of thistle

Carlina racemosa is a species of annual thistle in the family Asteraceae, found across the Mediterranean region. It occurs mainly in wetlands and grasslands (non-alpine, non-saline).

== Description ==
Carlina racemosa is a spiny, spindly plant with simple, broad leaves and achenes. It can grow up to 0.29 m.
