= Calyciphora acarnella =

Scientific classification
- Kingdom: Animalia
- Phylum: Arthropoda
- Class: Insecta
- Order: Lepidoptera
- Family: Pterophoridae
- Genus: Calyciphora
- Species: C. acarnella

Binomial name
- Calyciphora acarnella (Walsingham, 1898)

Synonyms
- Alucita acarnella Walsingham, 1898

Species of plume moth

Calyciphora acarnella is a moth of the family Pterophoridae. It is found on Corsica and Sardinia.

The wingspan is 21–24 mm. The forewings are pale brownish-grey and the hindwings are bronzy-brownish.

The larvae feed on Picnomon acarna and Ptilostemon casabonae. They are pale greenish, covered with long white hairs.
