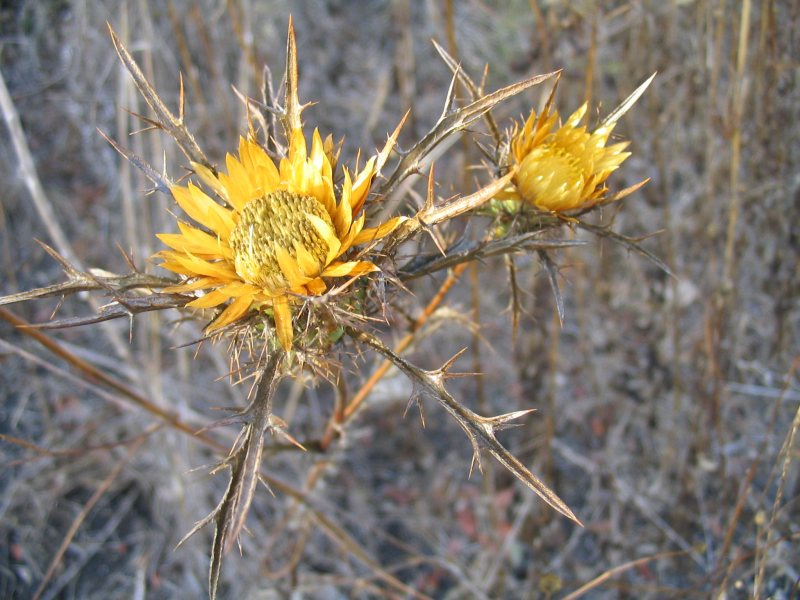

Scientific classification
- Kingdom: Plantae
- Clade: Tracheophytes
- Clade: Angiosperms
- Clade: Eudicots
- Clade: Asterids
- Order: Asterales
- Family: Asteraceae
- Genus: Carlina
- Species: C. curetum

Binomial name
- Carlina curetum Heldr. (1875)

Subspecies and varieties
- Carlina curetum subsp. curetum; Carlina curetum var. montana Meusel & A.Kástner; Carlina curetum subsp. orientalis Meusel & A.Kástner

= Carlina curetum =

Species of flowering plant

Carlina curetum is a species of the genus Carlina. It is also called carline thistle. It is native to the eastern Mediterranean, including Crete, the Levant, Israel and Egypt.

== Subspecies and varieties ==
Three subspecies and varieties are accepted.

- Carlina curetum subsp. curetum – Crete and Karpathos
- Carlina curetum var. montana Meusel & A.Kástner – Lebanon
- Carlina curetum subsp. orientalis Meusel & A.Kástner – Egypt, Israel and Palestine, Lebanon and Syria
