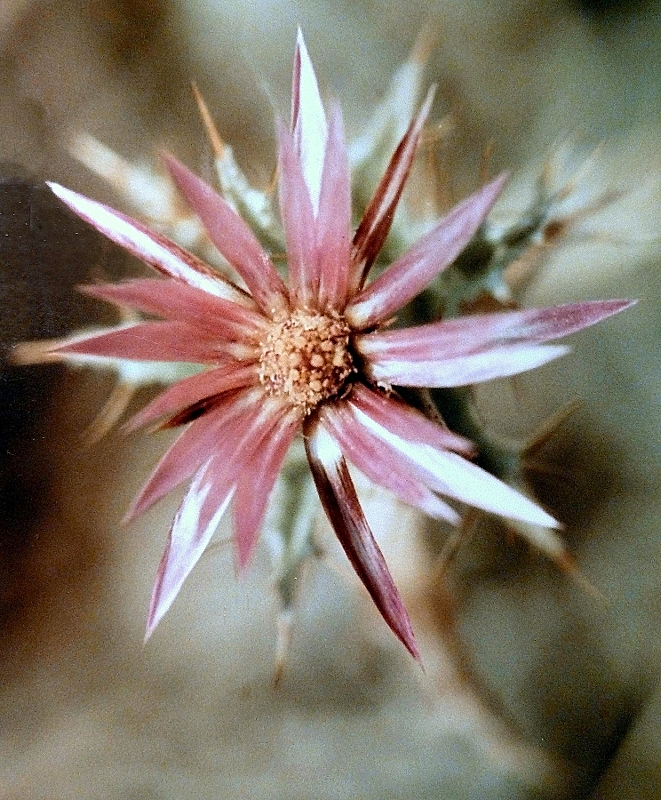
- In Greece

Scientific classification
- Kingdom: Plantae
- Clade: Embryophytes
- Clade: Tracheophytes
- Clade: Angiosperms
- Clade: Eudicots
- Clade: Asterids
- Order: Asterales
- Family: Asteraceae
- Genus: Carlina
- Species: C. lanata

Binomial name
- Carlina lanata L.

Synonyms
- Carlina pola Hacq.; Chromatolepis lanata Dulac; Mitina lanata Cass.

= Carlina lanata =

Species of plant

Carlina lanata is a species of plant in the family Asteraceae.

== Sources ==
This article incorporates text from a free content work. Licensed under CC0 (license statement/permission). Text taken from Carlina lanata. Encyclopedia of Life.
