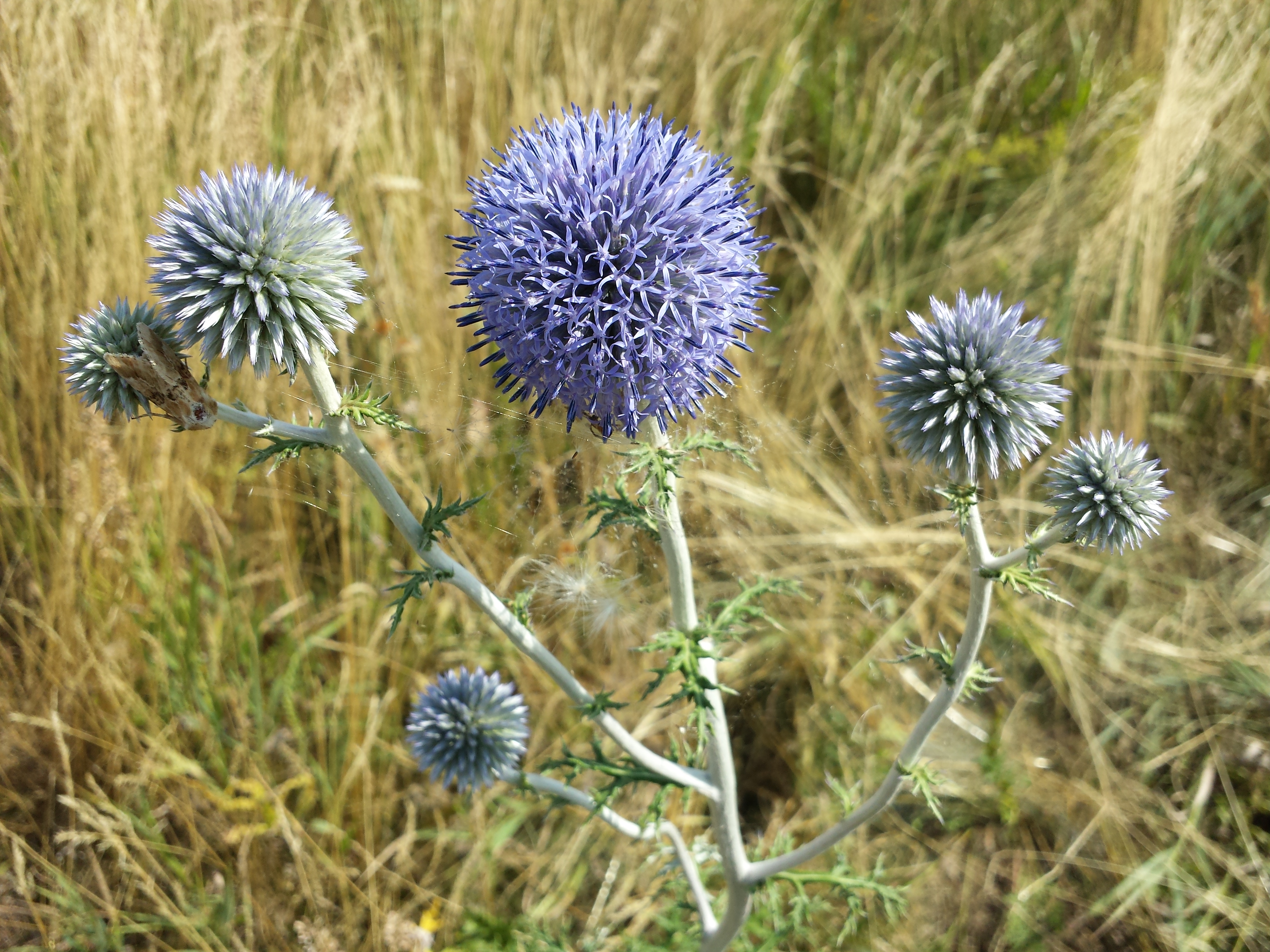

Scientific classification
- Kingdom: Plantae
- Clade: Tracheophytes
- Clade: Angiosperms
- Clade: Eudicots
- Clade: Asterids
- Order: Asterales
- Family: Asteraceae
- Genus: Echinops
- Species: E. ritro
- Subspecies: E. r. subsp. ruthenicus

Trinomial name
- Echinops ritro subsp. ruthenicus (M.Bieb.) Nyman

= Echinops ritro subsp. ruthenicus =

Subspecies of plant

Echinops ritro subsp. ruthenicus is a subspecies of Echinops ritro in the family Asteraceae.

== Description ==
It is a perennial plant up to 1 metre tall with thistle-like leaves. The stems are greyish-white, the leaves green above and pale grey-green to white below; the flowers are blue-violet, produced in a dense capitulum 3–4.5 cm diameter.

== Distribution ==
It is native to Central Europe, Baltic states, European Russia and Xinjiang. It is introduced into Germany, New York and Washington.

== Medical properties ==
This species may have been used in traditional medicine for its potential anti-inflammatory properties. This plant is not toxic to humans and pets.
