= Calyciphora adamas =

Scientific classification
- Kingdom: Animalia
- Phylum: Arthropoda
- Class: Insecta
- Order: Lepidoptera
- Family: Pterophoridae
- Genus: Calyciphora
- Species: C. adamas

Binomial name
- Calyciphora adamas (Constant, 1895)

Synonyms
- Aciptilia adamas Constant, 1895

Species of plume moth

Calyciphora adamas is a species of moth from the Pterophoridae family. It is found in Portugal, Spain, southern France and Italy.

The larvae feed on Staehelina dubia.
