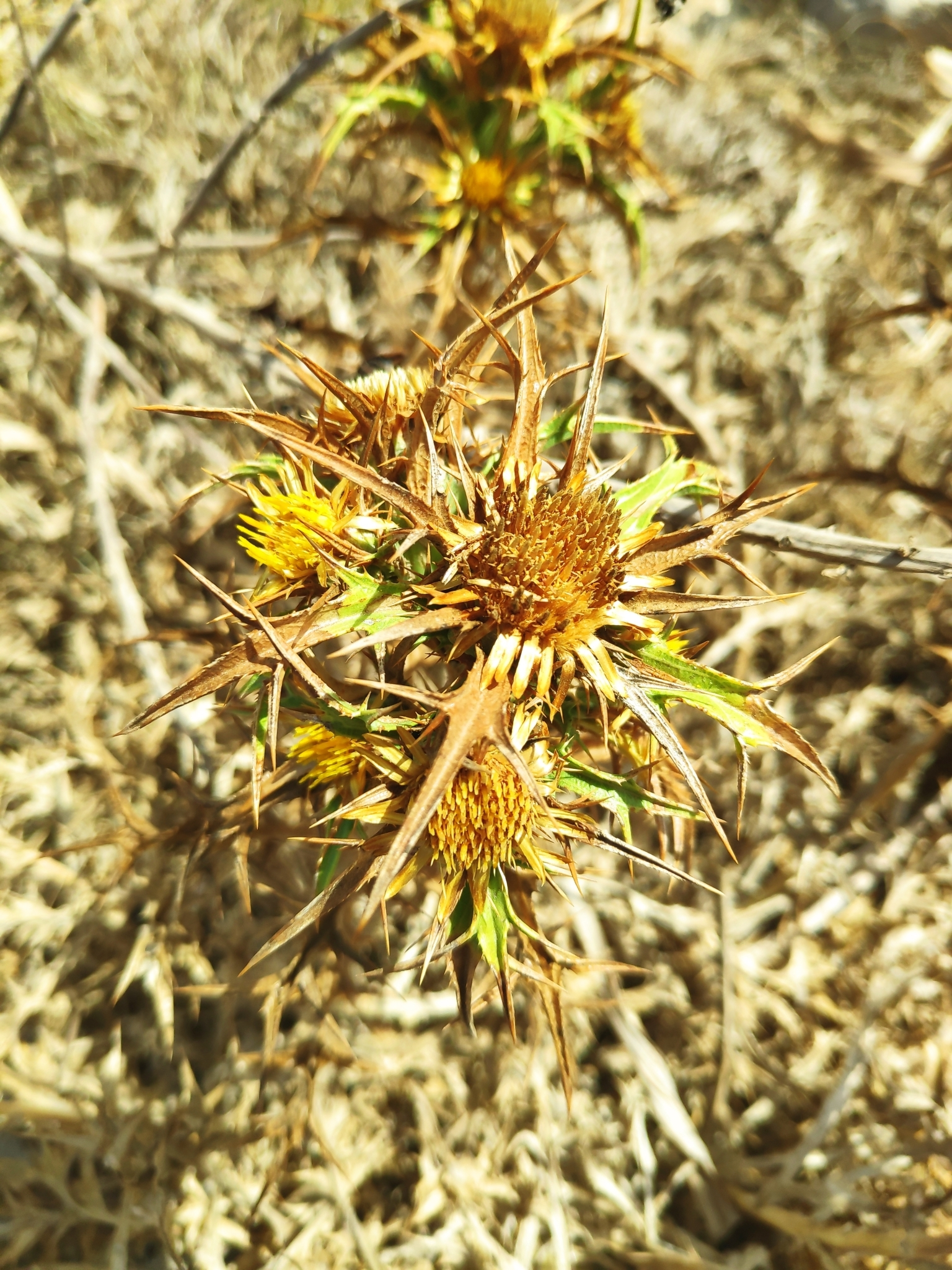

Scientific classification
- Kingdom: Plantae
- Clade: Tracheophytes
- Clade: Angiosperms
- Clade: Eudicots
- Clade: Asterids
- Order: Asterales
- Family: Asteraceae
- Genus: Carlina
- Species: C. involucrata

Binomial name
- Carlina involucrata Poir.

Synonyms
- Carlina corymbosa subsp. involucrata

= Carlina involucrata =

Species of plant

Carlina involucrata is a species of perennial herb in the family Asteraceae. They have a self-supporting growth form and broad leaves.

== Sources ==
This article incorporates text from a free content work. Licensed under CC0 (license statement/permission). Text taken from Carlina involucrata. Encyclopedia of Life.
