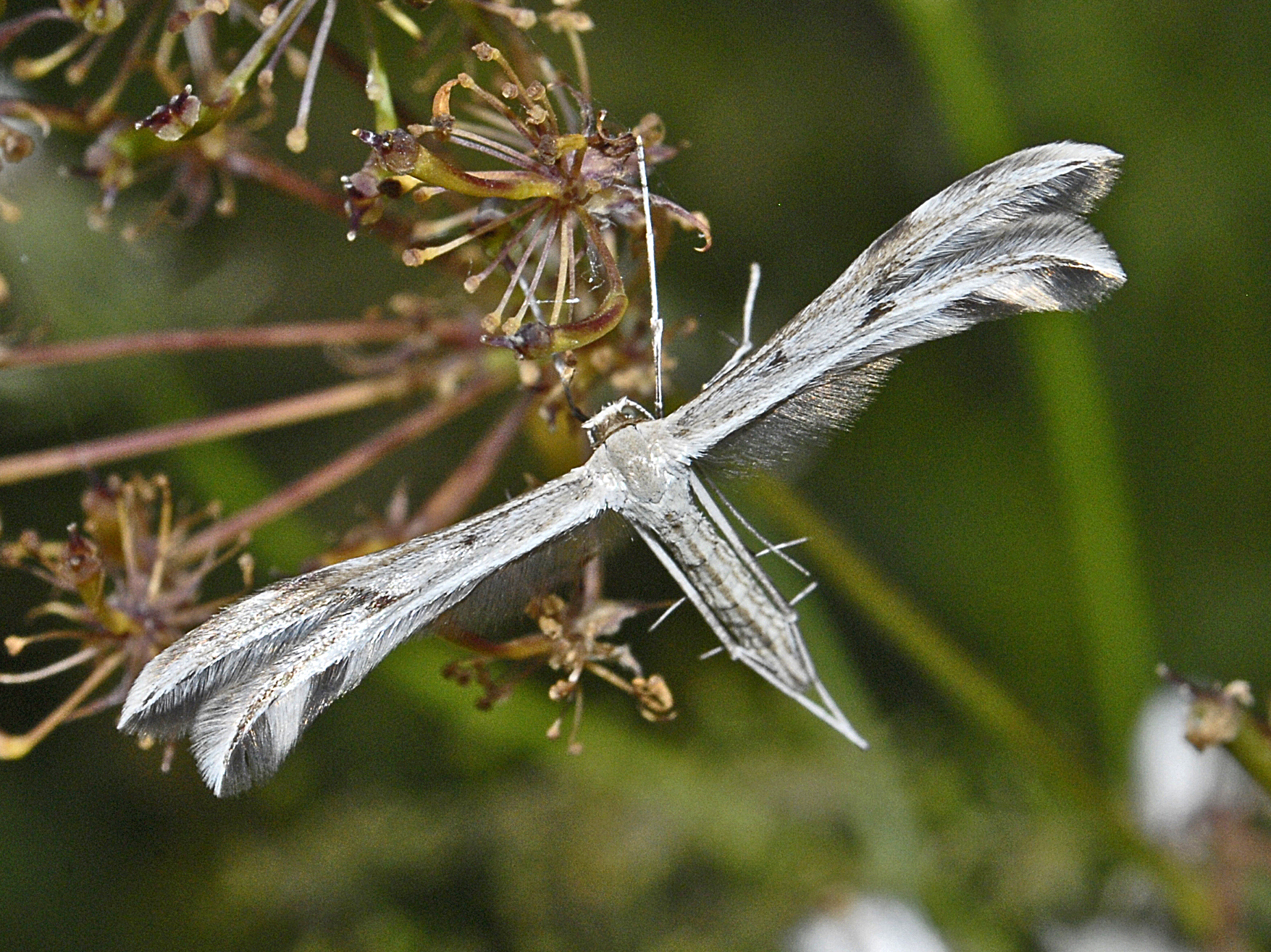
- Calyciphora nephelodactyla

Scientific classification
- Domain: Eukaryota
- Kingdom: Animalia
- Phylum: Arthropoda
- Class: Insecta
- Order: Lepidoptera
- Family: Pterophoridae
- Subfamily: Pterophorinae
- Tribe: Pterophorini
- Genus: Calyciphora; Kasy, 1960

= Calyciphora =

Plume moth genus

Calyciphora is a genus of moths in the family Pterophoridae, erected in 1960 by F. Kasy. It has a Palaearctic distribution, with species ranging from Western Europe to Russia, Kazakhstan and Kyrgyzstan.

== Species ==
As of version 1.1.23.125, the Catalogue of the Pterophoroidea of the World lists the following species for genus Calyciphora:

- Calyciphora acarnella (Walsingham, 1898)
- Calyciphora adamas (Constant, 1895)
- Calyciphora albodactylus (Fabricius, 1794)
- Calyciphora golestanica Alipanah & Ustjuzhanin, 2005
- Calyciphora homoiodactyla (Kasy, 1960)
- Calyciphora korbi Ustjuzhanin & Kovtunovich, 2020
- Calyciphora ludmilae Ustjuzhanin & Kovtunovick, 2011
- Calyciphora marashella Zagulajev, 1986
- Calyciphora nephelodactyla (Eversmann, 1844)
- Calyciphora xanthodactyla (Treitschke, 1833)
