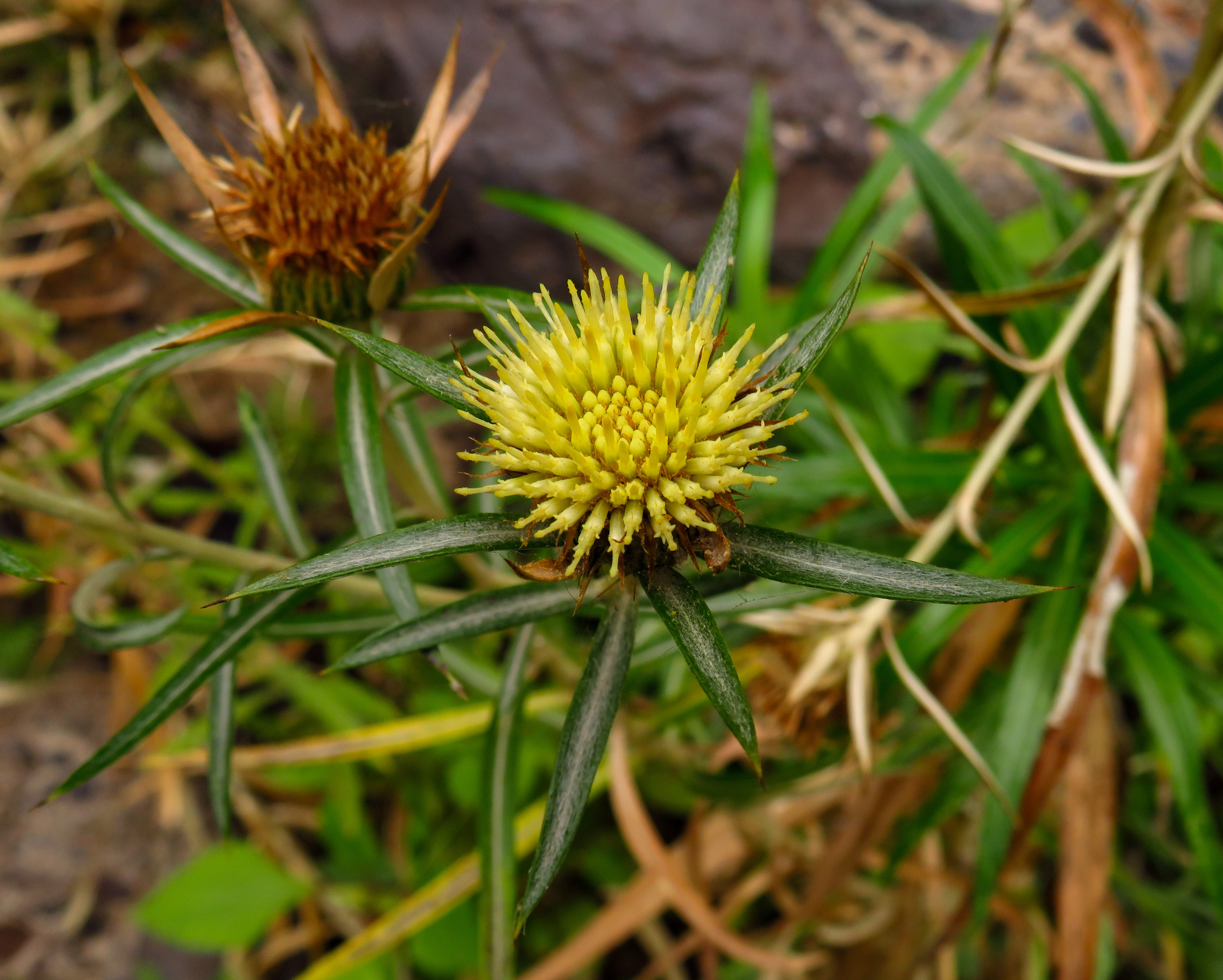

Scientific classification
- Kingdom: Plantae
- Clade: Tracheophytes
- Clade: Angiosperms
- Clade: Eudicots
- Clade: Asterids
- Order: Asterales
- Family: Asteraceae
- Genus: Carlina
- Species: C. salicifolia

Binomial name
- Carlina salicifolia (L.f.) Cav.

Synonyms
- Carthamus salicifolius L.f.

= Carlina salicifolia =

Species of flowering plant

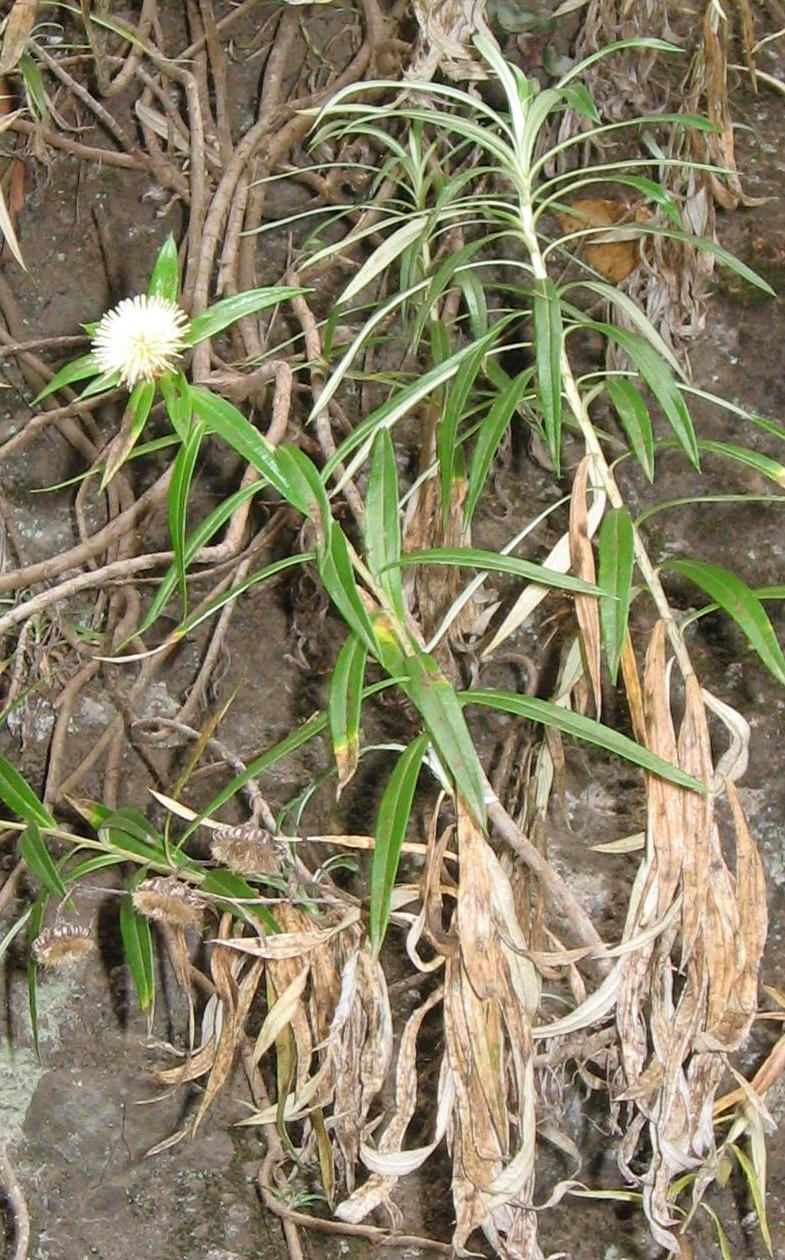

Carlina salicifolia is a species of thistle native to the Canary Islands and Madeira.

== Description ==
Low shrubby perennial to 1 m. Stems branched, white-tomentose in the upper parts and with prominent leaf-scars. Leaves alternate, entire, deciduous but long persistent after withering, crowded towards the ends of the branches, 6–10 cm x 6–15 mm, lanceolate, coriaceous, green and glabrescent above, densely white tomentose beneath, subsessile and with a few ciliate spines at the base. Capitulum 15–30 mm in diameter (excluding outer bracts), discoid to hemispherical on short peduncles solitary or in corymbs. Outer involucral bracts large, leafy of varying lengths, lanceolate to ovate, the inner scarious, shiny, stiff and spreading when dry. Inner involucral bracts shorter than the outer, scarious, recurved, spiny at the apex, blackish or purplish brown . Receptacle flat, scales persistent divided into linear segments, bristles also sometimes present, often tipped with red. Florets creamy yellow, hermaphrodite, all with a tubular 5-lobed corolla, ray florets absent. Achenes oblong 3 mm, pappus of 1 row of plumose, dense, appressed, caduceus, shiny brown hairs 2- to 3- branched and united at the base into clusters. Fl. V-VIII.

== Distribution ==
It ranges throughout much of the island of Madeira on cliffs and rocky slopes; also on Porto Santo and on the Desertas. It is native to all of the Canary Islands where it is common on cliffs in the upper xerophytic and forest zones 200–1600 m. It is very rare on Lanzarote found in the Famara mountain range and on Fuerteventura found in the Jandia area which covers the southwestern mountainous part of the island.

== Subdivisions ==
Four subdivisions are accepted.

- Carlina salicifolia f. excedens G.Kunkel – Canary Islands
- Carlina salicifolia var. gomerensis G.Kunkel – Canary Islands
- Carlina salicifolia subsp. lancerottensis G.Kunkel – Canary Islands (Lanzarote)
- Carlina salicifolia subsp. salicifolia – the Canary Islands and Madeira
