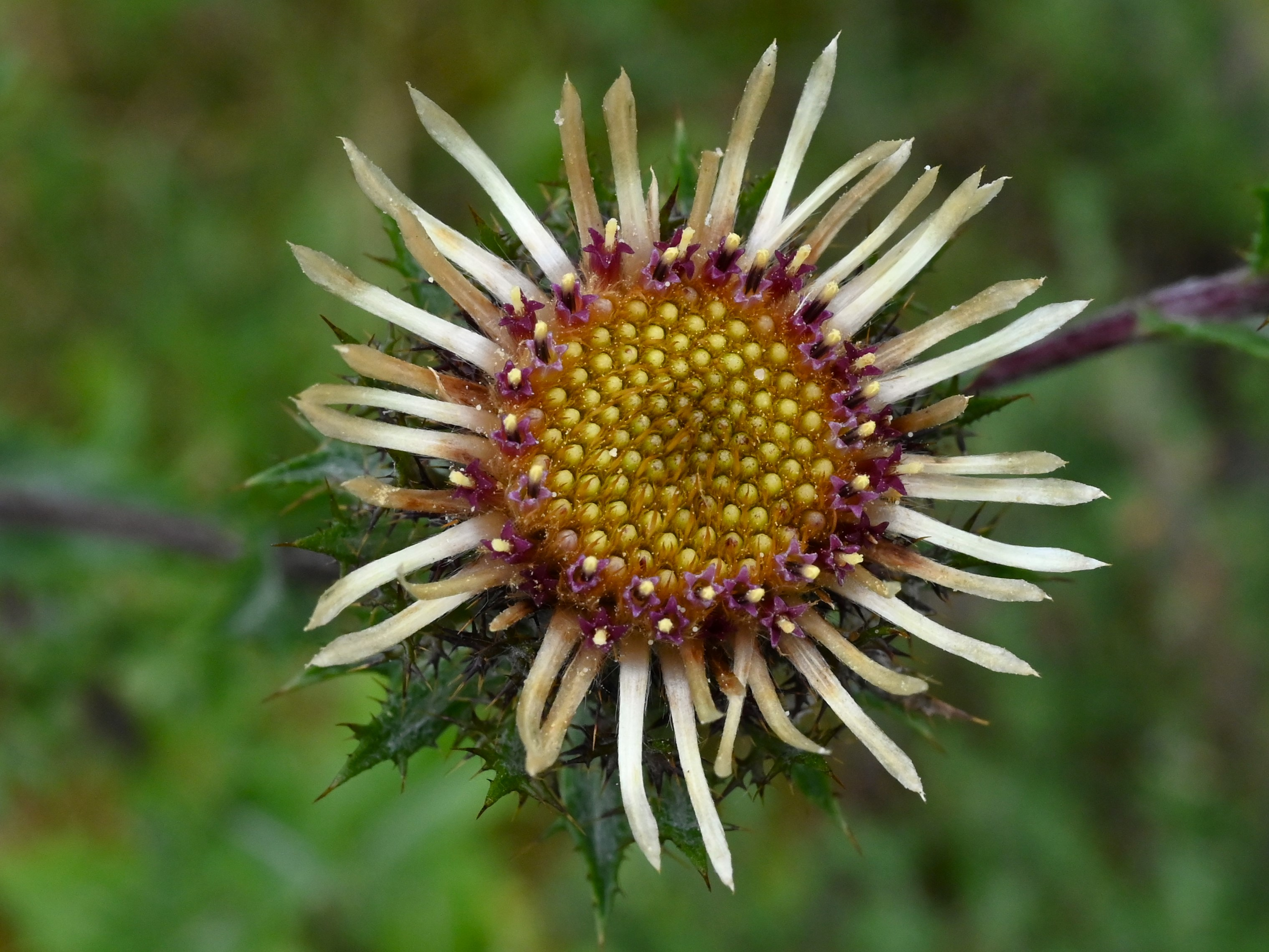

Scientific classification
- Kingdom: Plantae
- Clade: Tracheophytes
- Clade: Angiosperms
- Clade: Eudicots
- Clade: Asterids
- Order: Asterales
- Family: Asteraceae
- Genus: Carlina
- Species: C. vulgaris

Binomial name
- Carlina vulgaris L.

= Carlina vulgaris =

Species of flowering plant

Carlina vulgaris, the carline thistle, is a plant species of the genus Carlina.

It is a biennial that grows on limestone, chalky or other alkaline grasslands or dunes. The flowers are clusters of very small brown florets surrounded by brown-golden bracts. Both feel dry and spiky, so at first glance the plants appear to be dying when in full flower. The green leaves are spiny and may have hairs. Plants are often short but can reach 60 cm.

It originates from Europe, north Africa and Asia but is also found in other parts of the world such as North America. It is considered an invasive species in parts of its introduced range.
