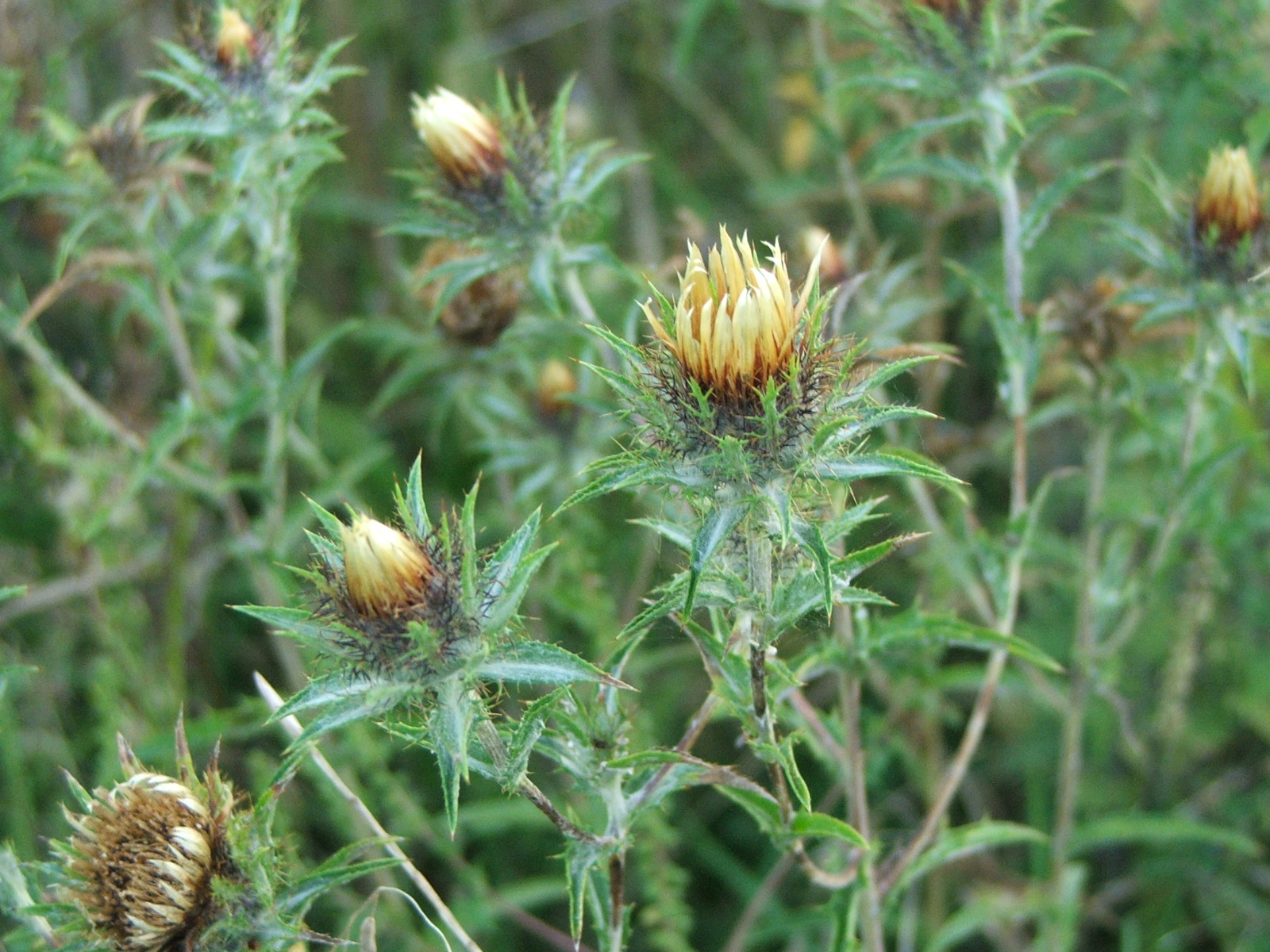

Scientific classification
- Kingdom: Plantae
- Clade: Tracheophytes
- Clade: Angiosperms
- Clade: Eudicots
- Clade: Asterids
- Order: Asterales
- Family: Asteraceae
- Genus: Carlina
- Species: C. biebersteinii

Binomial name
- Carlina biebersteinii Bernh. ex Hornem.

= Carlina biebersteinii =

Species of flowering plant

Carlina biebersteinii is a purple-flowered herb in the tribe Cardueae of the family Asteraceae. It is found in Europe, Russia, Kazakhstan and in the Xinjiang region of China. It grows in dry meadows and thickets.

Carlina biebersteinii Bernh. ex Hornem., Suppl. Hort. Bot. Hafn. 94. 1819.

Subspecies:

- Carlina biebersteinii var. fennica Meusel & Kästner (synonym: Carlina fennica (Meusel & Kästner) Tzvelev)

== Gallery ==
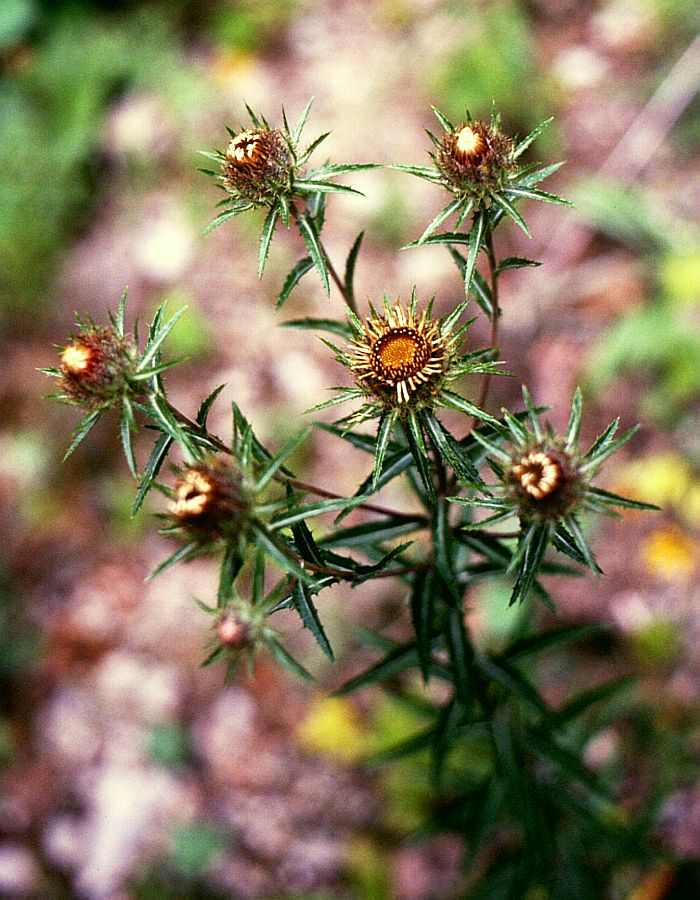

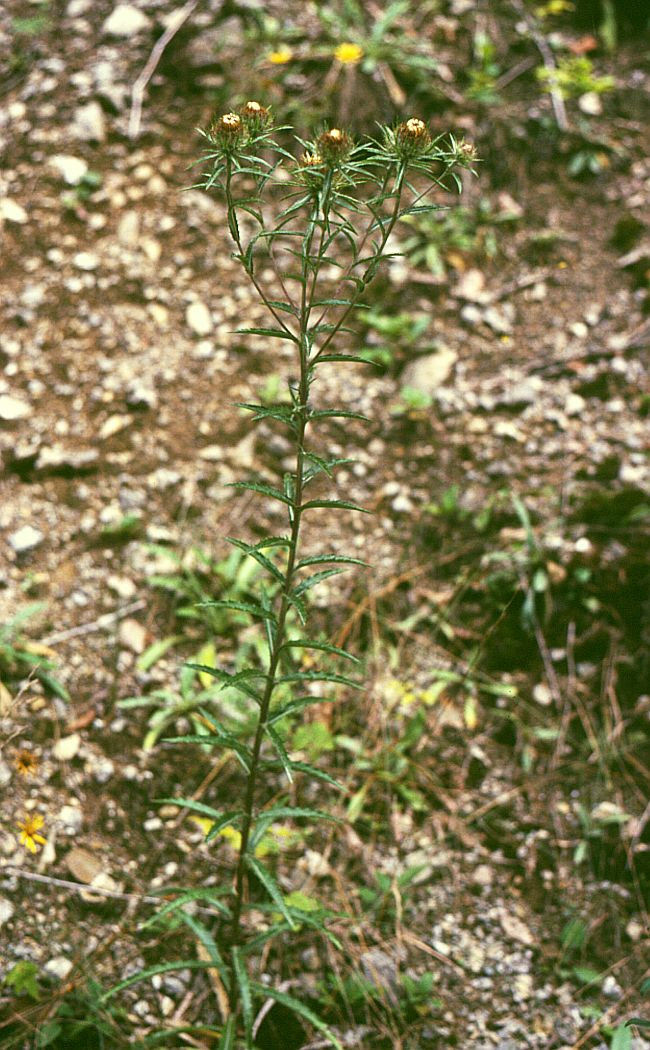

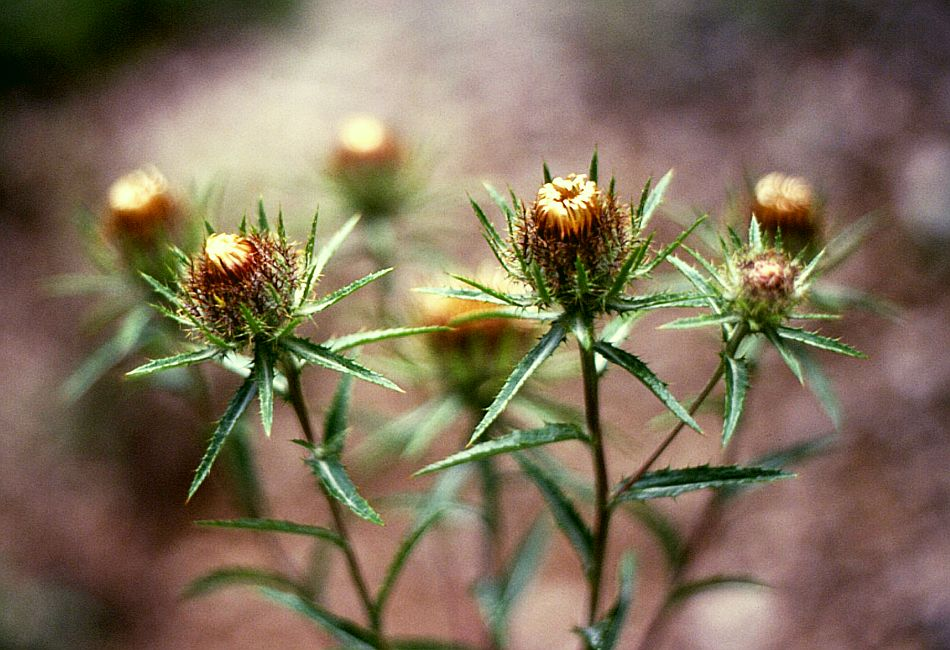
