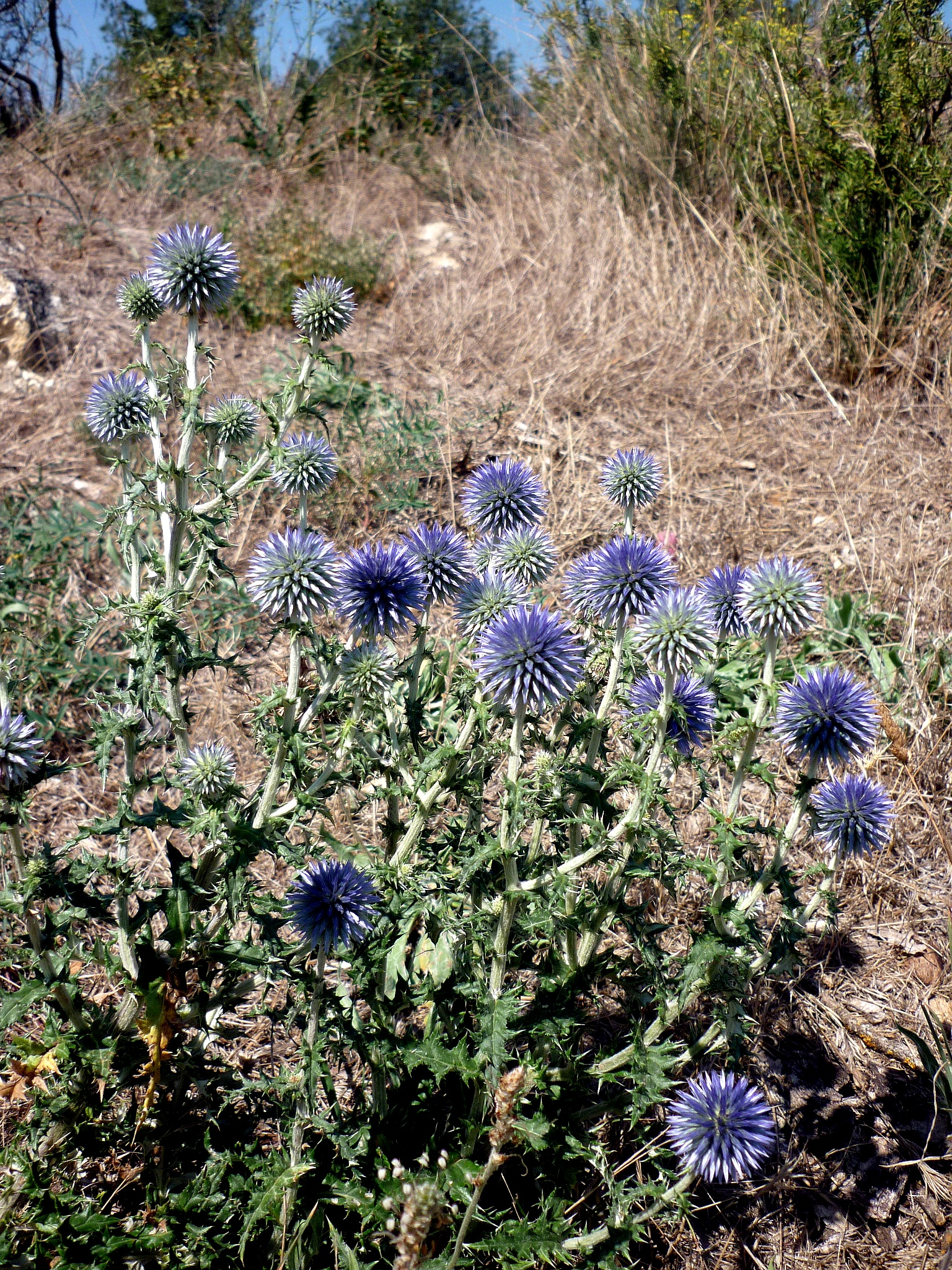
- Echinops ritro subsp. ritro in Torà, Segarra-Catalunya, Spain

Scientific classification
- Kingdom: Plantae
- Clade: Embryophytes
- Clade: Tracheophytes
- Clade: Spermatophytes
- Clade: Angiosperms
- Clade: Eudicots
- Clade: Asterids
- Order: Asterales
- Family: Asteraceae
- Genus: Echinops
- Species: E. ritro

Binomial name
- Echinops ritro L. 1753 not Georgi 1775

Synonyms
- Synonymy: Echinops tauricus Willd. ex Ledeb.; Echinops tenuifolius Fisch. ex Schkuhr; Echinops meyeri (DC.) Iljin, syn of subsp. meyeri; Echinops ruthenicus M.Bieb., syn of subsp. ruthenicus; Echinops virgatus Lam., syn of subsp. ruthenicus; Echinops sartorianus Boiss. & Heldr., syn of subsp. sartorianus; Echinops siculus Strobl, syn of subsp. siculus; Echinops thracicus Velen., syn of subsp. thracicus

= Echinops ritro =

Species of flowering plant in the daisy family

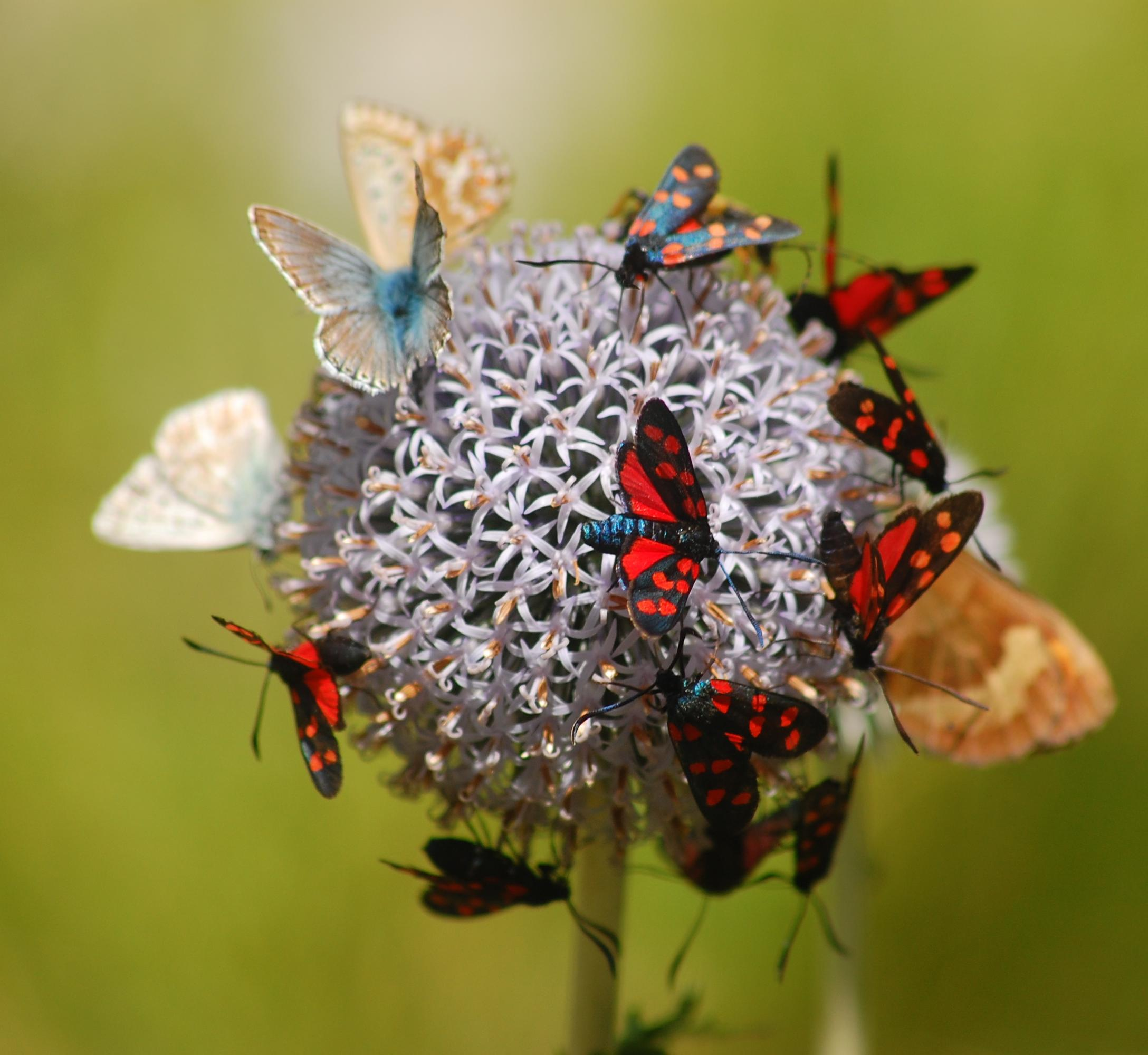
Various butterflies and moths on a flower of Echinops ritro subsp. ruthenicus, in the Juliana Alpine Botanical Garden, Trenta, Bovec, Slovenia

Echinops ritro, the southern globe thistle, is a species of flowering plant in the family Asteraceae, native to southern and eastern Europe, from Spain east to Turkey, Ukraine, and Belarus, and western and central Asia east to Mongolia. The species is also sparingly naturalised in scattered locations within North America.

== Description ==
It is a compact, bushy herbaceous perennial thistle, growing to 60 cm (24 in) tall, with broad prickly leaves and bearing globes of steel-blue flowers 2.5–4.5 cm (1.0–1.8 in) in diameter, in late summer.

== Taxonomy ==
Five subspecies are accepted by the Plants of the World Online database:

- Echinops ritro subsp. meyeri (DC.) Kožuharov
- Echinops ritro subsp. ritro
- Echinops ritro subsp. ruthenicus (M.Bieb.) Nyman
- Echinops ritro subsp. sartorianus (Boiss. & Heldr.) Kožuharov
- Echinops ritro subsp. thracicus (Velen.) Kožuharov

Additionally, one variety is accepted, but without specification as to which subspecies it belongs to:

- Echinops ritro var. elbursensis (Rech.f.) Parsa

== Cultivation ==
Echinops ritro and the subspecies E. ritro subsp. ruthenicus have gained the Royal Horticultural Society's Award of Garden Merit.

Plants previously reported as naturalised in Great Britain are mostly or all the related species Echinops bannaticus.
