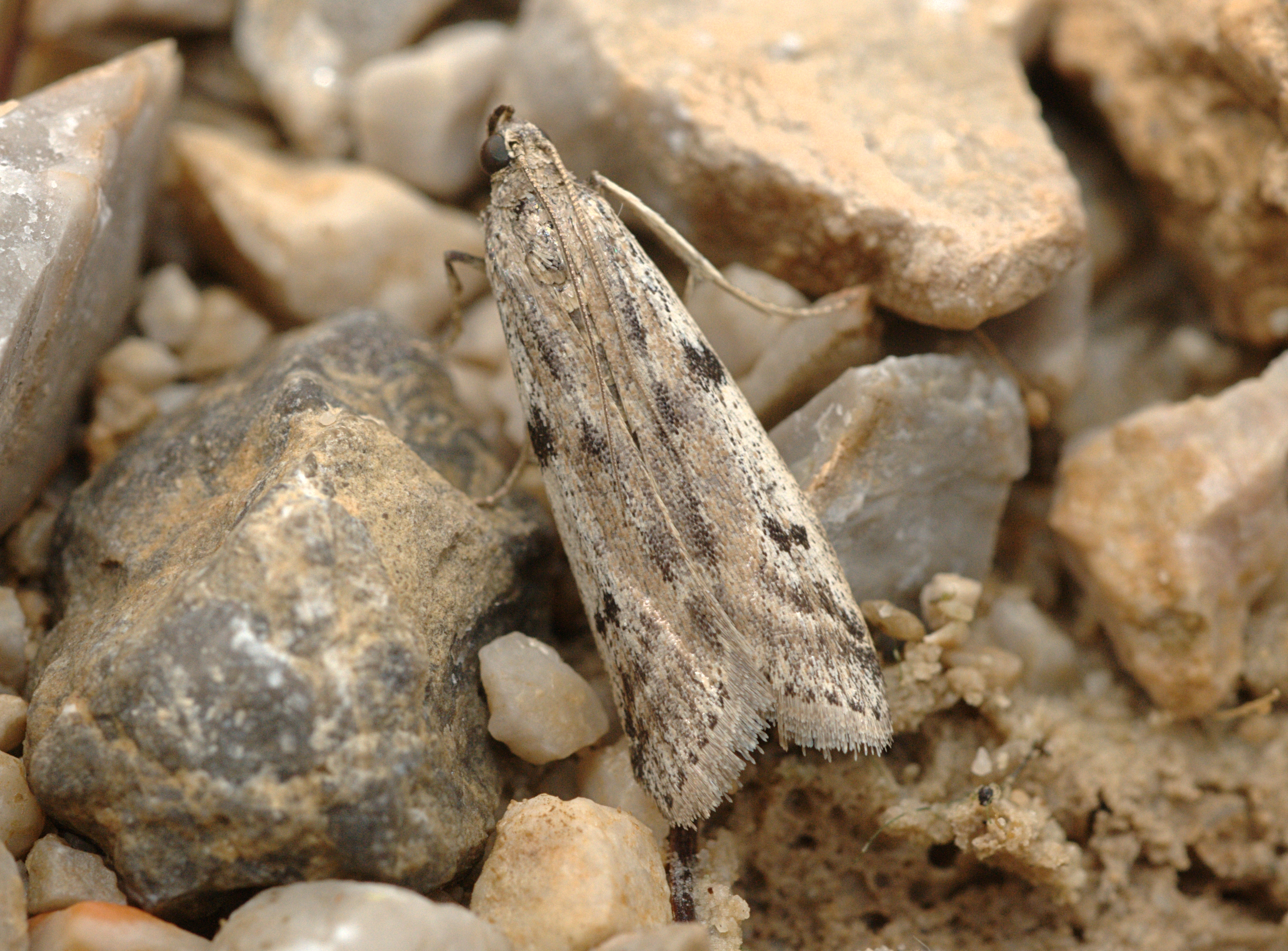
- Phycitodes binaevella

Scientific classification
- Kingdom: Animalia
- Phylum: Arthropoda
- Class: Insecta
- Order: Lepidoptera
- Family: Pyralidae
- Tribe: Phycitini
- Genus: Phycitodes; Hampson, 1917

Synonyms
- Rotruda Heinrich, 1956

= Phycitodes =

Genus of moths

Phycitodes is a genus of snout moths described by George Hampson in 1917.

== Species ==
- Phycitodes albatella (Ragonot, 1887)
- Phycitodes albistriata Hampson, 1917
- Phycitodes arenicola (Chrétien, 1911)
- Phycitodes binaevella (Hübner, 1813)
- Phycitodes delineata (T. P. Lucas, 1892)
- Phycitodes eliseannae P. Leraut, 2002
- Phycitodes gallicella P. Leraut, 2002
- Phycitodes inquinatella (Ragonot, 1887)
- Phycitodes lacteella (Rothschild, 1915)
- Phycitodes maritima (Tengström, 1848)
- Phycitodes melanosticta (Lower, 1903)
- Phycitodes mucidella (Ragonot, 1887)
- Phycitodes nigrilimbella (Ragonot, 1887)
- Phycitodes olivaceella (Ragonot, 1889)
- Phycitodes osteella (Ragonot, 1887)
- Phycitodes reliquellum (Dyar, 1904)
- Phycitodes saxicola (Vaughan, 1870)
- Phycitodes subcretacella (Ragonot, 1901)
