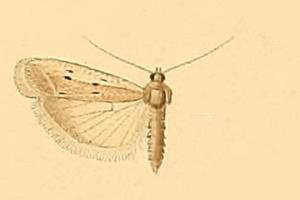

Scientific classification
- Domain: Eukaryota
- Kingdom: Animalia
- Phylum: Arthropoda
- Class: Insecta
- Order: Lepidoptera
- Family: Pyralidae
- Genus: Phycitodes
- Species: P. subcretacella

Binomial name
- Phycitodes subcretacella (Ragonot, 1901)

Synonyms
- Homoeosoma subcretacella Ragonot, 1901

= Phycitodes subcretacella =

Species of moth

Phycitodes subcretacella is a species of snout moth. It was described from Japan, but is also found in Spain and Russia.

The wingspan is 18–21 millimetres (0.71–0.83 in).
