= Phycitodes gallicella =

Scientific classification
- Domain: Eukaryota
- Kingdom: Animalia
- Phylum: Arthropoda
- Class: Insecta
- Order: Lepidoptera
- Family: Pyralidae
- Genus: Phycitodes
- Species: P. gallicella

Binomial name
- Phycitodes gallicella Leraut, 2002

Species of moth

Phycitodes gallicella is a species of snout moth which is endemic to France.
