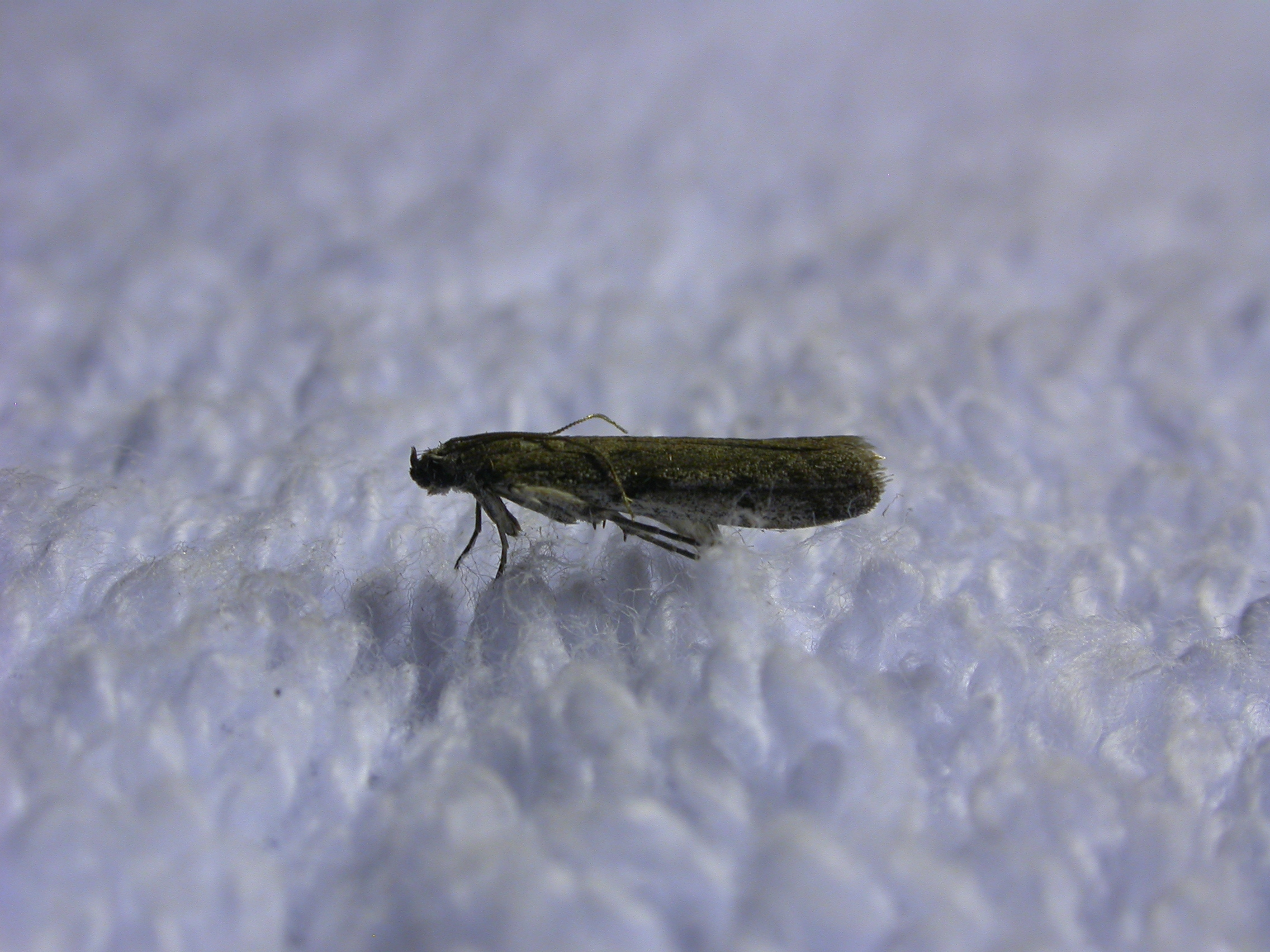

Scientific classification
- Domain: Eukaryota
- Kingdom: Animalia
- Phylum: Arthropoda
- Class: Insecta
- Order: Lepidoptera
- Family: Pyralidae
- Genus: Phycitodes
- Species: P. reliquella

Binomial name
- Phycitodes reliquella (Dyar, 1904)

Synonyms
- Homoeosoma reliquella Dyar, 1904; Phycitodes albatella reliquella

= Phycitodes reliquella =

Species of moth

Phycitodes reliquella is a moth of the family Pyralidae described by Harrison Gray Dyar Jr. in 1904. It is known from North America where it is widely distributed in the east, including Alabama, Arkansas, Connecticut, the District of Columbia, Florida, Georgia, Illinois, Louisiana, Massachusetts, Maryland, Maine, North Carolina, New Hampshire, New Jersey, New York, Ohio, Oklahoma, Pennsylvania, South Carolina, Virginia and Ontario.

The wingspan is less than 19 mm. Adults have been collected from May through September.
