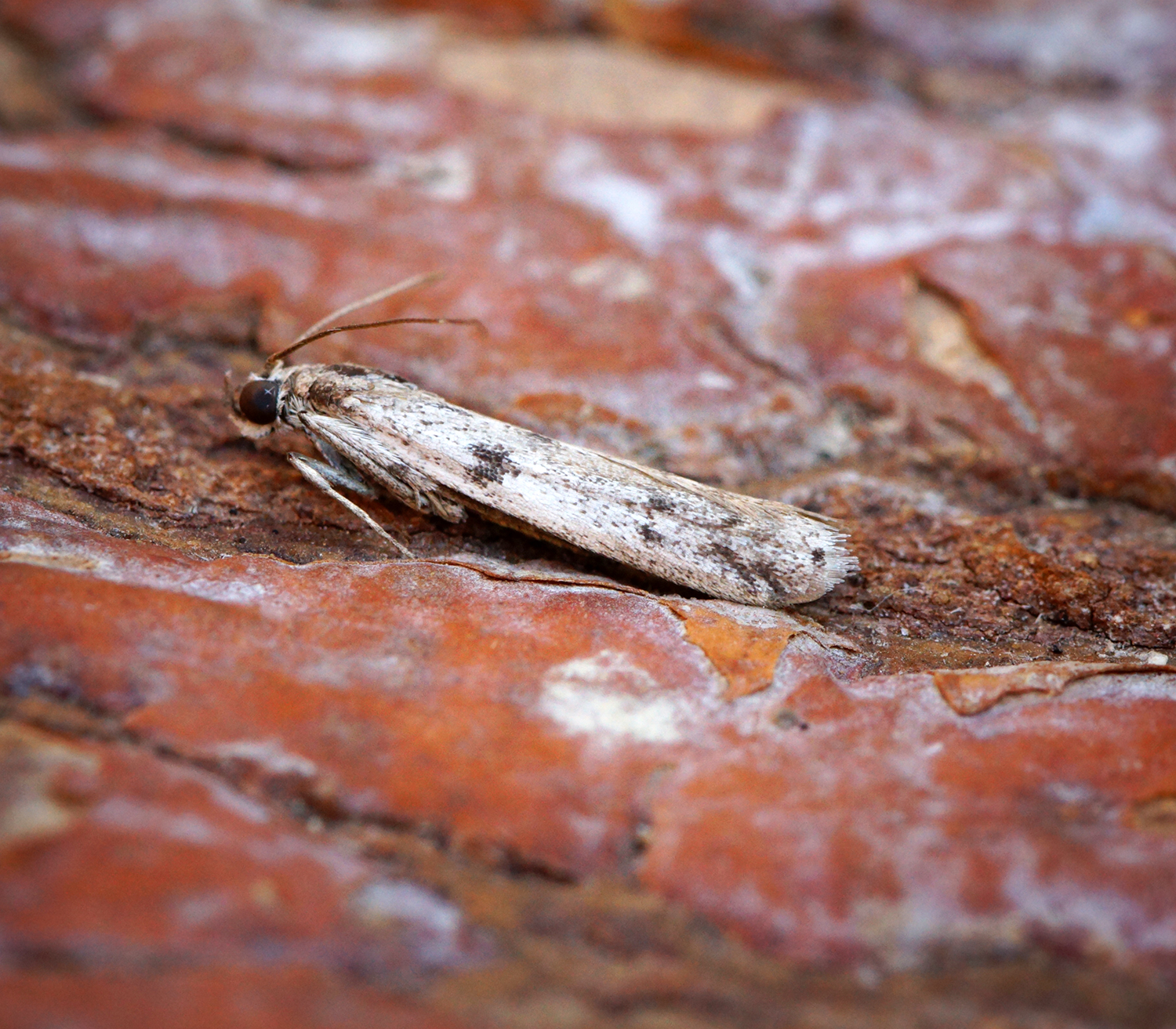

Scientific classification
- Domain: Eukaryota
- Kingdom: Animalia
- Phylum: Arthropoda
- Class: Insecta
- Order: Lepidoptera
- Family: Pyralidae
- Genus: Phycitodes
- Species: P. albatella

Binomial name
- Phycitodes albatella (Ragonot, 1887)

Synonyms
- Homoeosoma albatella Ragonot, 1887; Homoeosoma parvum Gerasimov, 1930; Homoeosoma pseudonimbella Bentinck, 1937; Rotruda albatella (Ragonot, 1887)

= Phycitodes albatella =

Species of moth

Phycitodes albatella is a species of snout moth. It is found in most of Europe (except Ireland, Great Britain, Slovenia, Croatia and Ukraine), Uzbekistan and North America.

The wingspan is 15–20 mm. There are three generations per year with adults on wing from April to September.

The larvae feed on Senecio, Crepis and Solidago species, as well as Sonchus arvensis. They initially live in the upper stem and leaf-axil of their host plant, but later on the flowers within a web. Larvae of the second generation hibernate within a cocoon. Pupation takes place in another cocoon.
