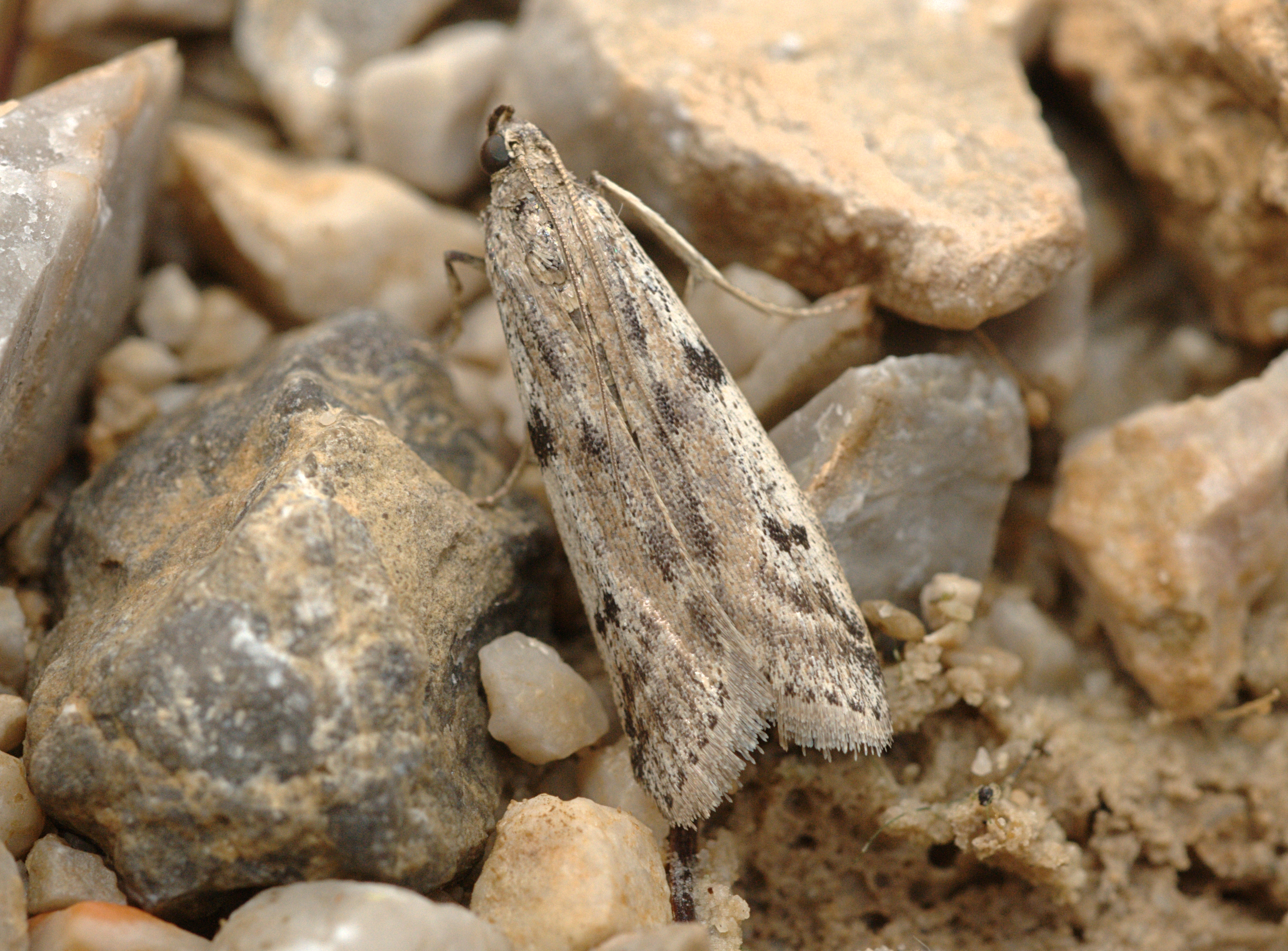

Scientific classification
- Domain: Eukaryota
- Kingdom: Animalia
- Phylum: Arthropoda
- Class: Insecta
- Order: Lepidoptera
- Family: Pyralidae
- Genus: Phycitodes
- Species: P. binaevella

Binomial name
- Phycitodes binaevella (Hübner, 1813)

Synonyms
- Tinea binaevella Hübner, 1813; Rotruda binaevella iranella Roesler, 1965; Homoeosoma binaevella var. petrella Herrich-Schäffer, 1849; Homoeosoma binaevella siciliella Zerny, 1914; Homoeosoma binaevella var. unitella Staudinger, 1879; Ephestia coarctella Ragonot, 1887; Homoeosoma binaevella var. ciliciella Caradja, 1910; Homoeosoma pinguinella Zerny, 1934

= Phycitodes binaevella =

Species of moth

Phycitodes binaevella is a species of snout moth described by Jacob Hübner in 1813. It is found in most of Europe (except Portugal), Asia Minor, Lebanon and the Palestinian Territories.

The wingspan is 18–27 millimetres (0.71–1.06 in). The forewings are distinctly dilated, pale brownish-ochreous, costal half suffused with white, with a few dark fuscous scales; first line indicated by a straight oblique series of three large dark fuscous dots; second pale, obscurely dark-edged; two large dark fuscous transversely placed discal dots. The hindwings arenlight fuscous. The larva is pale green; dorsal and subdorsal lines pink; spiracular pink, interrupted; head reddish-brown; plate of 2 posteriorly brownish: in flower-heads of .Cardwus lanceolatus.

There is one generation with adults on wing from July to August.

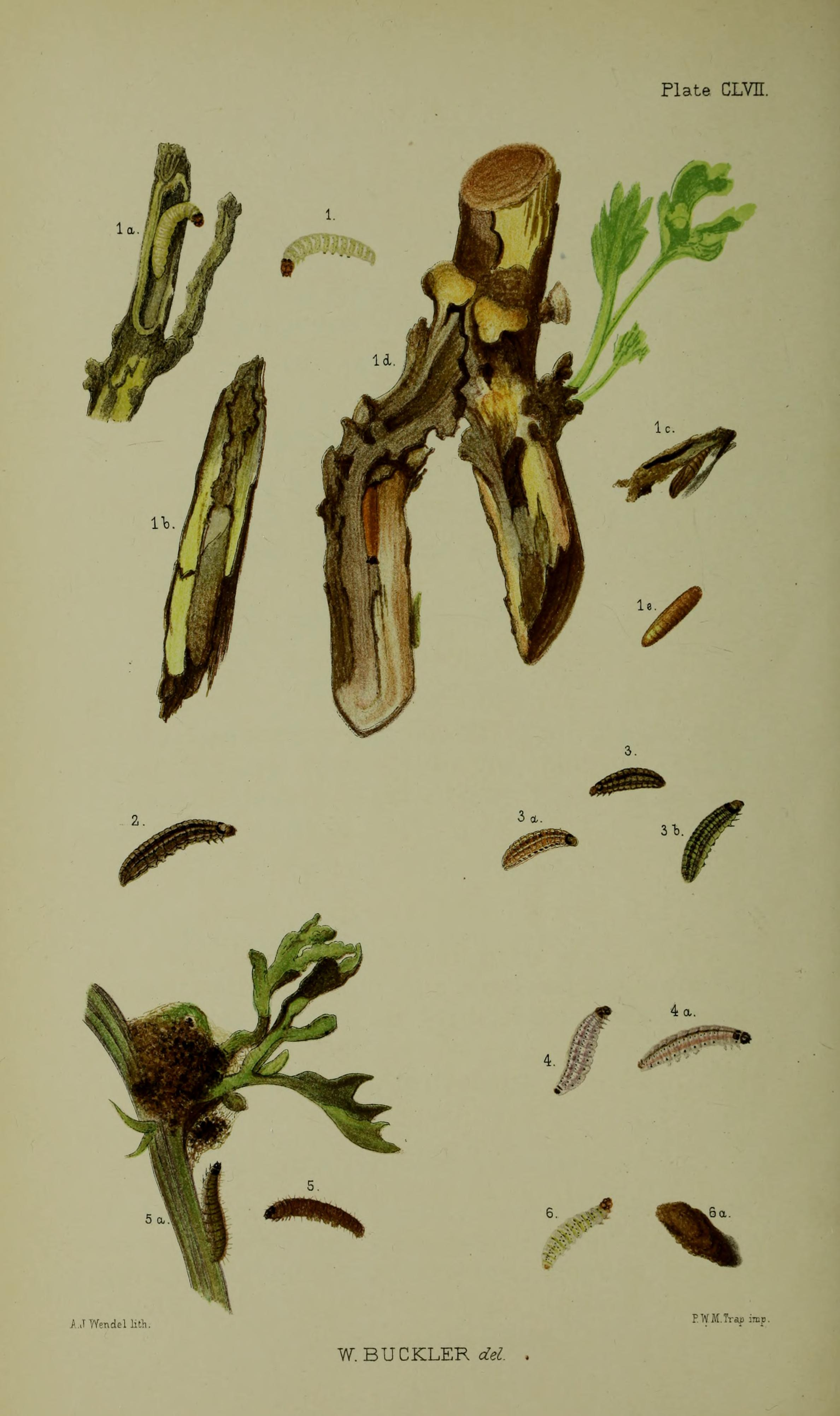
Figs. 4, 4a larva after final moult

The larvae feed on Cirsium vulgare, Carduus, Aster, Tanacetum vulgare and Artemisia vulgaris.
