= Phycitodes eliseannae =

Scientific classification
- Domain: Eukaryota
- Kingdom: Animalia
- Phylum: Arthropoda
- Class: Insecta
- Order: Lepidoptera
- Family: Pyralidae
- Genus: Phycitodes
- Species: P. eliseannae

Binomial name
- Phycitodes eliseannae Leraut, 2002

Species of moth

Phycitodes eliseannae is a species of snout moth. It is found in France and Spain.
