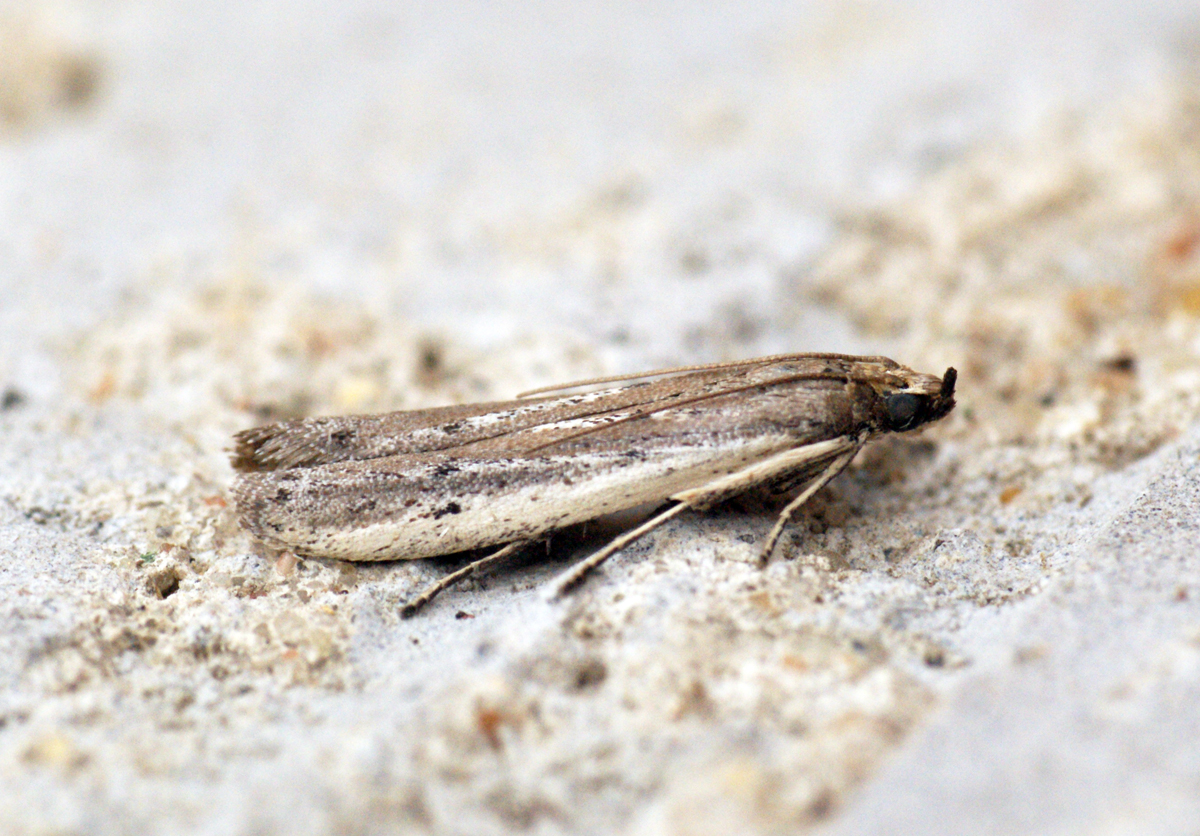

Scientific classification
- Kingdom: Animalia
- Phylum: Arthropoda
- Class: Insecta
- Order: Lepidoptera
- Family: Pyralidae
- Genus: Phycitodes
- Species: P. maritima

Binomial name
- Phycitodes maritima (Tengström, 1848)

Synonyms
- Phycidea nebulella var. maritima Tengström, 1848; Homoeosoma nimbella var. canuisella Ragonot, 1901; Homoeosoma carlinella Heinemann, 1865; Homoeosoma cretacella Rössler, 1866; Homoeosoma senecionis Vaughan, 1870

= Phycitodes maritima =

Species of moth

Phycitodes maritima is a species of snout moth. It is found in most of Europe (except Ireland, Lithuania, Ukraine and the western and southern part of the Balkan Peninsula. It may also be absent from the Iberian Peninsula).

The wingspan is 19–24 millimetres (0.75–0.94 in). Adults are on wing from April to May and from June to August. There are two generations per year.

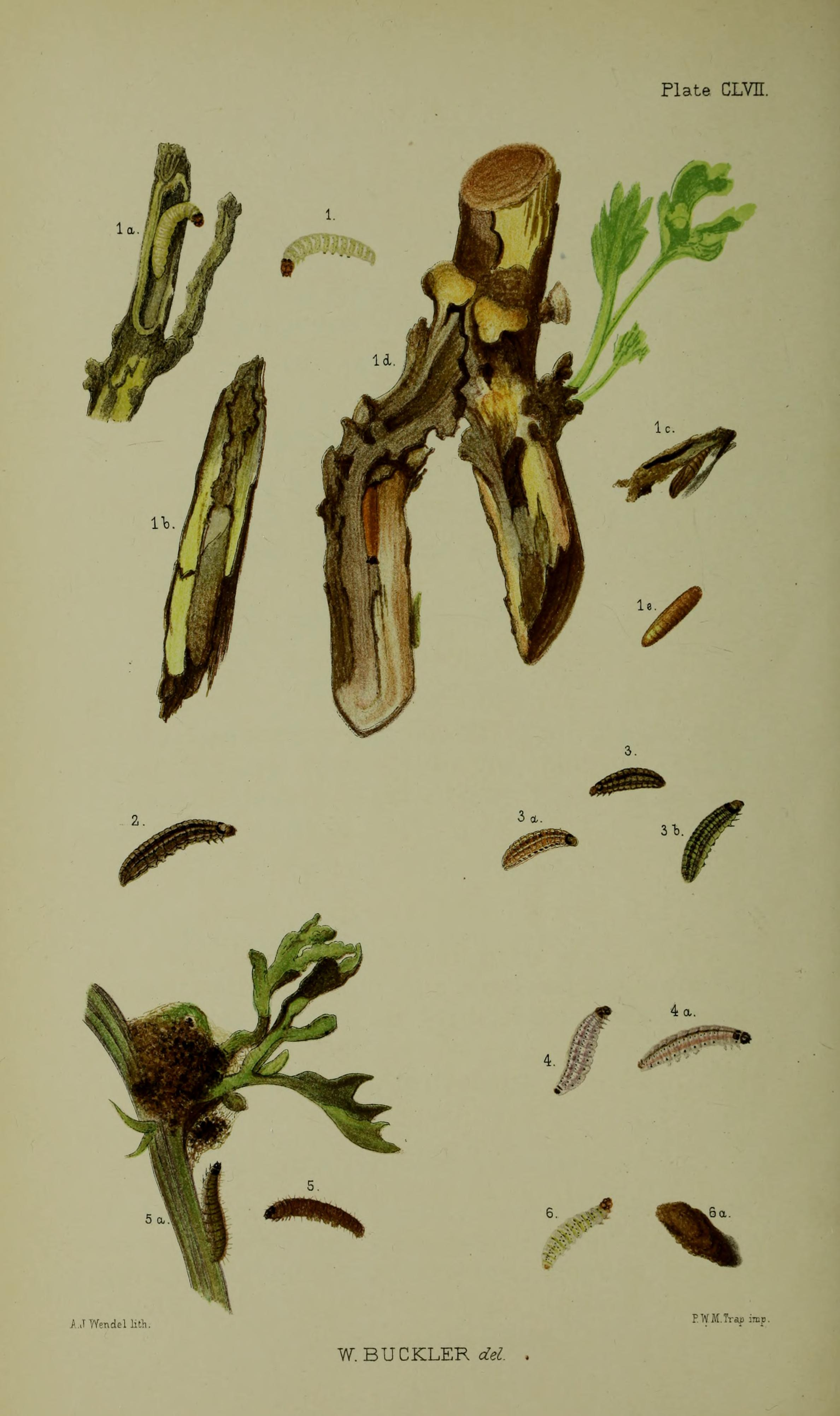
Figs. 5 larva after final moult 5a larva and frass covered web on ragwort

The larvae feed on Achillea millefolium, Tanacetum vulgare and Jacobaea vulgaris.
