= Phycitodes inquinatella =

Scientific classification
- Domain: Eukaryota
- Kingdom: Animalia
- Phylum: Arthropoda
- Class: Insecta
- Order: Lepidoptera
- Family: Pyralidae
- Genus: Phycitodes
- Species: P. inquinatella

Binomial name
- Phycitodes inquinatella (Ragonot, 1887)

Synonyms
- Homoeosoma inquinatella Ragonot, 1887; Rotruda inquinatella amseli Roesler, 1965; Phycitodes inquinatella canariella Rebel, 1892; Homoeosoma exustella Ragonot, 1888; Homoeosoma aixella D. Lucas, 1938; Homoeosoma inquinatella ravonella Pierce, 1937

Species of moth

Phycitodes inquinatella is a species of snout moth. It is found in most of Europe (except Ireland, Great Britain, Fennoscandia, the Baltic region, Ukraine, the Czech Republic, Slovenia, Croatia and Bulgaria), the Canary Islands, Turkey and the Palestinian Territories.

The wingspan is 15–18 millimetres (0.59–0.71 in).
