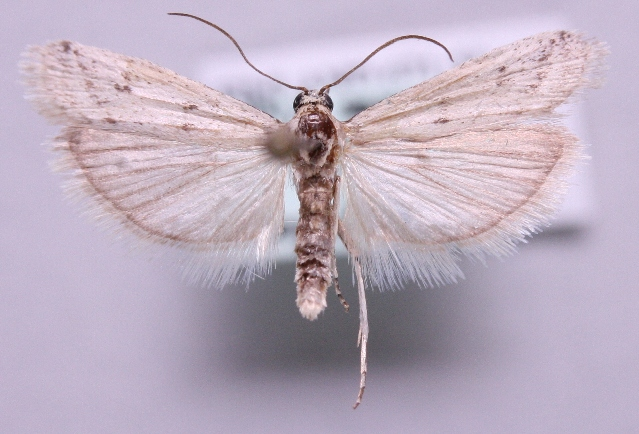

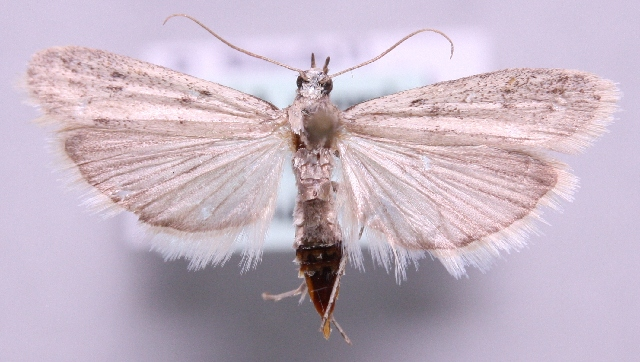

Scientific classification
- Domain: Eukaryota
- Kingdom: Animalia
- Phylum: Arthropoda
- Class: Insecta
- Order: Lepidoptera
- Family: Pyralidae
- Genus: Phycitodes
- Species: P. lacteella

Binomial name
- Phycitodes lacteella (Rothschild, 1915)

Synonyms
- Staudingeria lacteella Rothschild, 1915; Homoeosoma lacteella bentinckella Pierce, 1937; Rotruda bentinckella delattini Roesler, 1965; Rotruda bentinckella santoruella Roesler, 1965; Rotruda bentinckella viettella Roesler, 1965

= Phycitodes lacteella =

Species of moth

Phycitodes lacteella is a species of snout moth first described by Walter Rothschild in 1915. It is found in most of Europe (except Ireland, Great Britain, Norway, the Benelux, Switzerland, the Baltic region, Poland, the Czech Republic, Slovakia, Slovenia, Croatia and Ukraine), Algeria, Morocco and Turkey.

The wingspan is 17–19 millimetres (0.67–0.75 in). Adults are on wing in September.
