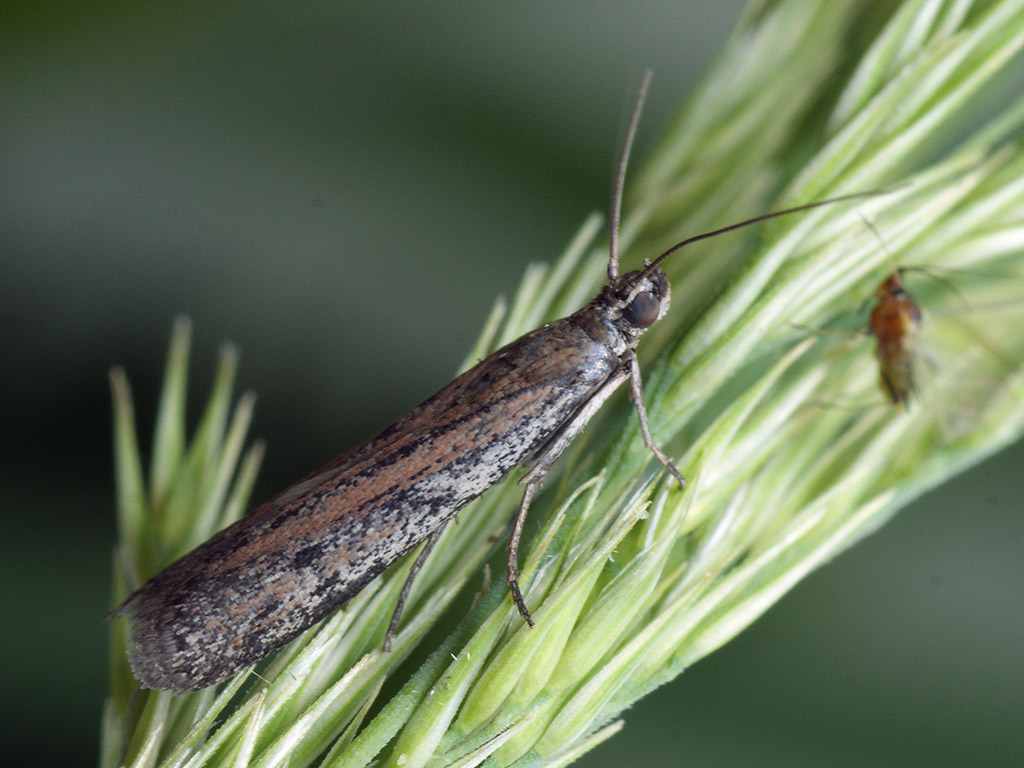
- Phycitodes saxicola Moscow Oblast

Scientific classification
- Domain: Eukaryota
- Kingdom: Animalia
- Phylum: Arthropoda
- Class: Insecta
- Order: Lepidoptera
- Family: Pyralidae
- Genus: Phycitodes
- Species: P. saxicola

Binomial name
- Phycitodes saxicola (Vaughan, 1870)

Synonyms
- Homoeosoma saxicola Vaughan, 1870; Homoeosoma comeella Amsel, 1961; Homoeosoma subbinaevella Ragonot, 1888; Homoeosoma vallettae Amsel, 1951; Rotruda saxicola teneriffella Roesler, 1965; Staudingeria griseopunctata D. Lucas, 1956

= Phycitodes saxicola =

Species of moth

Phycitodes saxicola, the small clouded knot-horn, is a species of snout moth described by Vaughan in 1870. It is found in most of Europe (except Poland, Ukraine and the western part of the Balkan Peninsula), as well as Iran, Morocco and the Canary Islands.

The wingspan is 12–19 mm. It is very similar to other Phycitodes. Certain identification is by microscopic examination of the genitalia.

Adults are on wing from June to August in one generation per year.

The larvae feed on the flower heads of various Asteraceae species, including Achillea millefolium, Senecio (such as Senecio jacobaea), Anthemis, Jasione and Tanacetum species.
