= Selagia fuscorubra =

Scientific classification
- Domain: Eukaryota
- Kingdom: Animalia
- Phylum: Arthropoda
- Class: Insecta
- Order: Lepidoptera
- Family: Pyralidae
- Genus: Selagia
- Species: S. fuscorubra

Binomial name
- Selagia fuscorubra Riel, 1928

Species of moth

Selagia fuscorubra is a species of snout moth. It is found in France.
