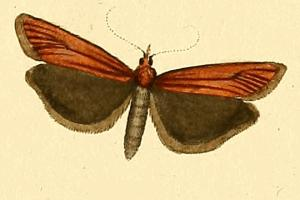

Scientific classification
- Kingdom: Animalia
- Phylum: Arthropoda
- Clade: Pancrustacea
- Class: Insecta
- Order: Lepidoptera
- Family: Pyralidae
- Tribe: Phycitini
- Genus: Selagia; Hübner, 1825

Synonyms
- Anacria Chrétien in Caradja, 1910

= Selagia =

Genus of moths

Selagia is a genus of snout moths described by Jacob Hübner in 1825.

== Species ==
- Selagia argyrella (Denis & Schiffermüller, 1775)
- Selagia disclusella Ragonot, 1887
- Selagia dissimilella Ragonot, 1887
- Selagia fuscorubra Riel, 1928
- Selagia griseolella Ragonot, 1887
- Selagia spadicella (Hübner, 1796)
- Selagia subochrella (Herrich-Schaffer, 1849)
- Selagia uralensis Rebel, 1910
- Selagia zernyi Toll, 1942
