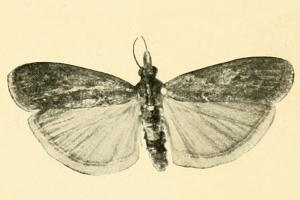

Scientific classification
- Domain: Eukaryota
- Kingdom: Animalia
- Phylum: Arthropoda
- Class: Insecta
- Order: Lepidoptera
- Family: Pyralidae
- Genus: Selagia
- Species: S. uralensis

Binomial name
- Selagia uralensis Rebel, 1910

= Selagia uralensis =

Species of moth

Selagia uralensis is a species of snout moth. It is found in Russia.

The wingspan is 13–14 mm.
