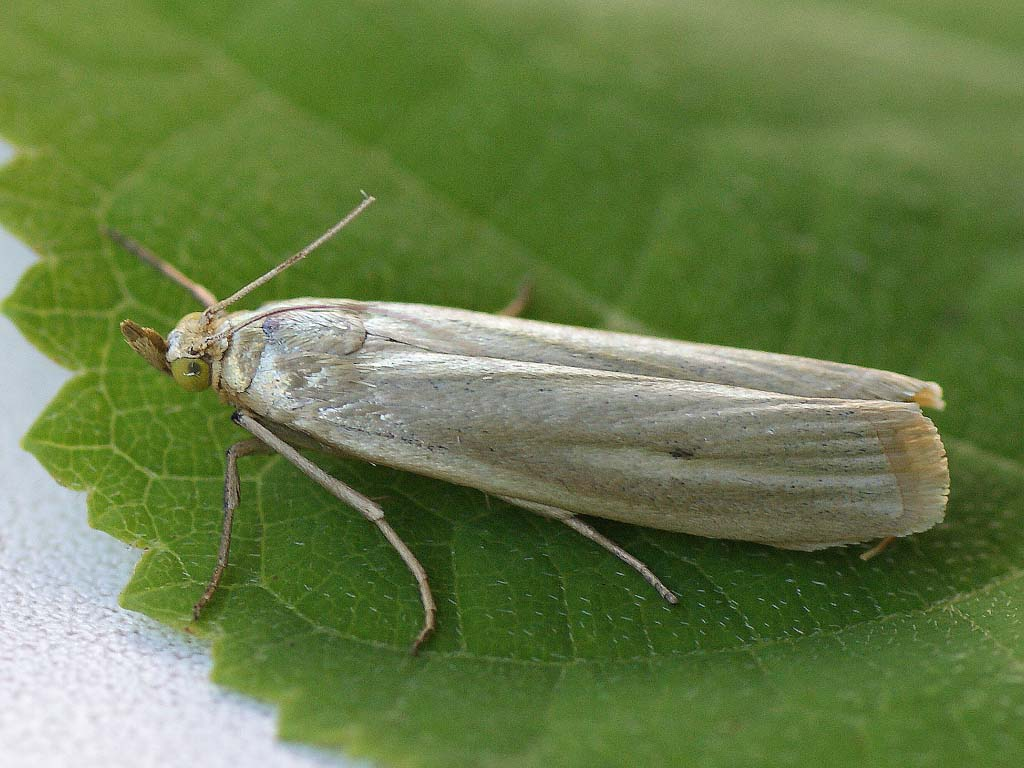

Scientific classification
- Kingdom: Animalia
- Phylum: Arthropoda
- Clade: Pancrustacea
- Class: Insecta
- Order: Lepidoptera
- Family: Pyralidae
- Genus: Selagia
- Species: S. argyrella

Binomial name
- Selagia argyrella (Denis & Schiffermuller, 1775)

Synonyms
- Tinea argyrella Denis & Schiffermüller, 1775

= Selagia argyrella =

Species of moth

Selagia argyrella is a species of snout moth. It is found in almost all of Europe, except Ireland, Norway, Finland, Estonia, Ukraine and Portugal. In the east, the range extends to Asia.

The wingspan is 22–28 mm.

The larvae feed on Calluna vulgaris, Helianthemum and Potentilla.
