= Agapeta largana =

Scientific classification
- Domain: Eukaryota
- Kingdom: Animalia
- Phylum: Arthropoda
- Class: Insecta
- Order: Lepidoptera
- Family: Tortricidae
- Genus: Agapeta
- Species: A. largana

Binomial name
- Agapeta largana (Rebel, 1906)

Synonyms
- Euxanthis hamana var. largana Rebel, 1906; Agapeta vicolana Capuse, 1964

Species of moth

Agapeta largana is a species of moth of the family Tortricidae. It is found on Crete and in France, Austria, Slovenia, Albania, Hungary, Bulgaria, Romania and Greece. It occurs in wet, sandy habitats.

The wingspan is 16–23 mm. Adults have been recorded on wing from May to July.
