= Metallosticha plumbeifasciella =

Scientific classification
- Kingdom: Animalia
- Phylum: Arthropoda
- Class: Insecta
- Order: Lepidoptera
- Family: Pyralidae
- Genus: Metallosticha
- Species: M. plumbeifasciella

Binomial name
- Metallosticha plumbeifasciella (Hampson, 1896)

Synonyms
- Euzophera plumbeifasciella Hampson, 1896

Species of moth

Metallosticha plumbeifasciella is a species of snout moth in the genus Metallosticha. It was described by George Hampson in 1896 and is known from India (including Kolkata, in West Bengal, the type location).
