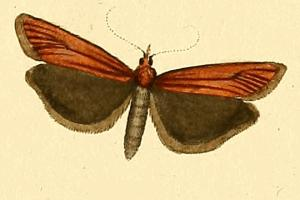

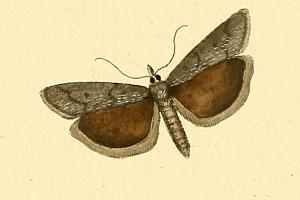

Scientific classification
- Kingdom: Animalia
- Phylum: Arthropoda
- Class: Insecta
- Order: Lepidoptera
- Family: Pyralidae
- Genus: Selagia
- Species: S. spadicella

Binomial name
- Selagia spadicella (Hubner, 1796)

Synonyms
- Tinea spadicella Hubner, 1796; Tinea janthinella Hubner, 1813; Nephopteryx janthinella var. saltuella Mann, 1862; Pterothrix brunneella D. Lucas, 1956; Selagia spadicella isabellella Zerny, 1935; Selagia spadicella declaratella Zerny, 1927

= Selagia spadicella =

Species of moth

Selagia spadicella is a species of snout moth. It is found in most of Europe (except Ireland, Great Britain, Portugal, Spain and Slovenia), as well as in Turkey and North Africa (including Morocco).

The wingspan is 23–28 mm. Adults are on wing from July to September.

The larvae feed on Calluna and Teucrium species.
