= Selagia subochrella =

Scientific classification
- Domain: Eukaryota
- Kingdom: Animalia
- Phylum: Arthropoda
- Class: Insecta
- Order: Lepidoptera
- Family: Pyralidae
- Genus: Selagia
- Species: S. subochrella

Binomial name
- Selagia subochrella (Herrich-Schaffer, 1849)

Synonyms
- Nephopterix subochrella Herrich-Schaffer, 1849

Species of moth

Selagia subochrella is a species of snout moth. It is found in Spain, Bosnia and Herzegovina, Bulgaria, North Macedonia, Greece and Russia.
