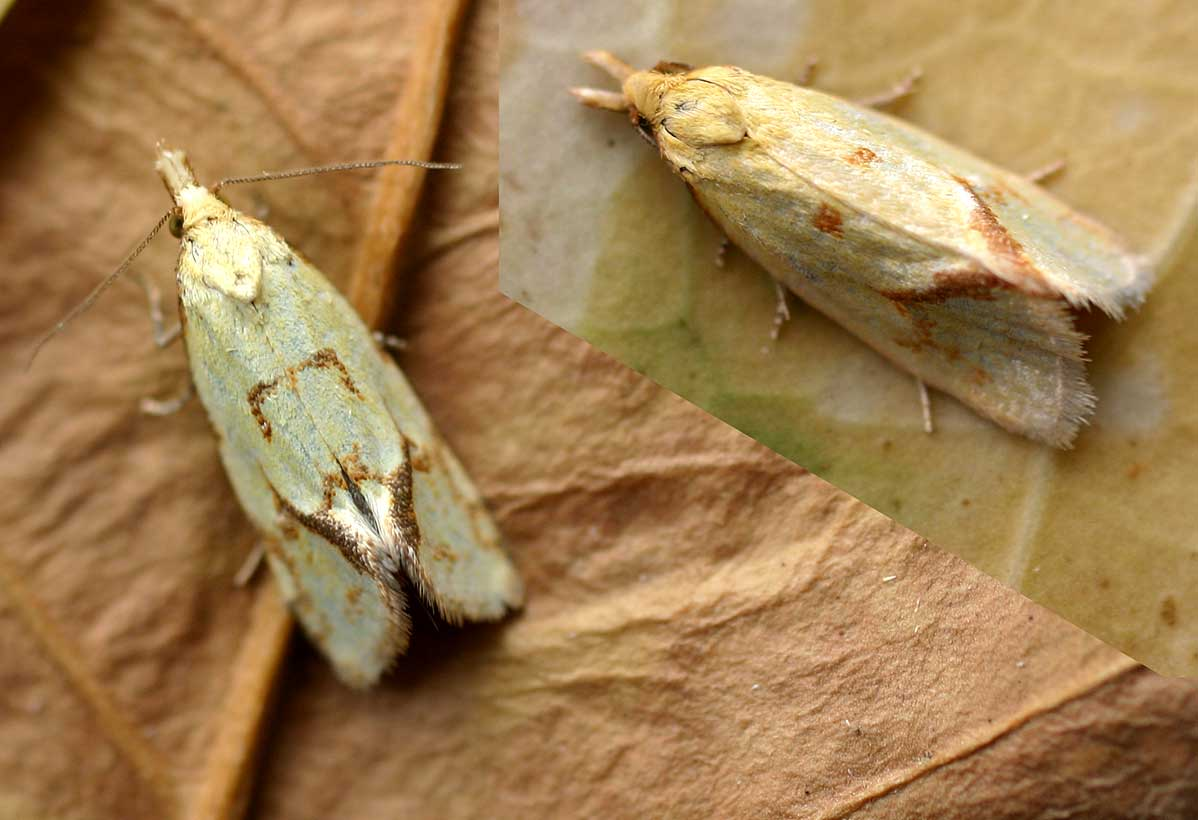

Scientific classification
- Kingdom: Animalia
- Phylum: Arthropoda
- Clade: Pancrustacea
- Class: Insecta
- Order: Lepidoptera
- Family: Tortricidae
- Genus: Agapeta
- Species: A. hamana

Binomial name
- Agapeta hamana (Linnaeus, 1758)

Synonyms
- Phalaena hamana Linnaeus, 1758; Euxanthis hamana ab. albana Dufrane, 1960; Euxanthis hamana ab. albana Schille, 1917; Euxanthis hamana ab. deficiens Dufrane, 1960; Euxanthis hamana ab. depuncta Obraztsov, 1943; Phalaena diversana Hubner, 1793; Euxanthis hamana ab. periphragmella Schawerda, 1911

= Agapeta hamana =

Species of moth

Agapeta hamana is a moth of the family Tortricidae. It is found in Europe (from the Iberian Peninsula to the Ural Mountains), the Caucasus, Transcaucasia, Asia Minor, Iran, Afghanistan, Central Asia, western and southern Siberia, Kazakhstan, Mongolia, western China and northern India.

The wingspan is 15–25 mm. The pale yellow forewing has the costa moderately arched. The base of the costa, and a streak from the disc to beyond the middle of the tornus are ferruginous-fuscous. Sometimes there are several irregular variable ferruginous marks towards the margins. The hindwings are rather dark grey. Julius von Kennel provides a full description.

The moth flies from June to August, from dusk.

The larvae feed on Carduus.
