= Metallosticha aigneri =

Scientific classification
- Kingdom: Animalia
- Phylum: Arthropoda
- Class: Insecta
- Order: Lepidoptera
- Family: Pyralidae
- Genus: Metallosticha
- Species: M. aigneri

Binomial name
- Metallosticha aigneri (Amsel, 1935)

Synonyms
- Ametallosticha aigneri Amsel, 1935

Species of moth

Metallosticha aigneri is a species of snout moth in the genus Metallosticha. It was described by Hans Georg Amsel in 1935 and is known from Israel.
