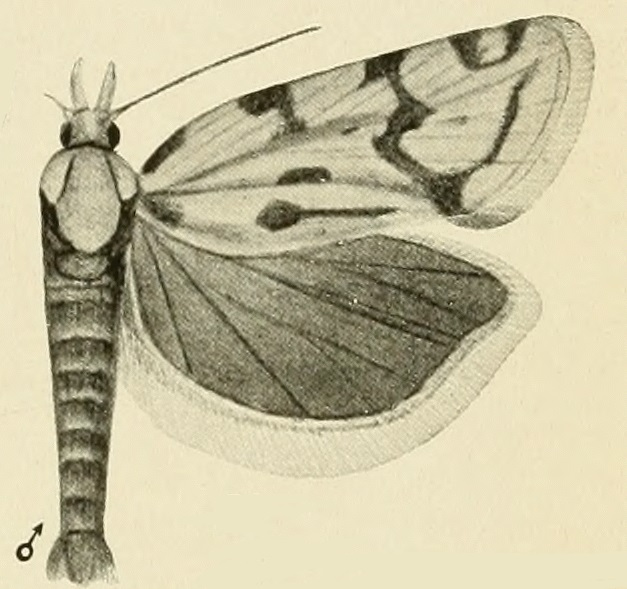

Scientific classification
- Domain: Eukaryota
- Kingdom: Animalia
- Phylum: Arthropoda
- Class: Insecta
- Order: Lepidoptera
- Family: Tortricidae
- Genus: Agapeta
- Species: A. angelana

Binomial name
- Agapeta angelana (Kennel, 1919)

Synonyms
- Euxanthis angelana Kennel, 1919

= Agapeta angelana =

Species of moth

Agapeta angelana is a species of moth of the family Tortricidae. It is found in Spain.

The wingspan is 23–25 mm. Adults have been recorded on wing from June to August.
