= Metallosticha =

Scientific classification
- Kingdom: Animalia
- Phylum: Arthropoda
- Class: Insecta
- Order: Lepidoptera
- Family: Pyralidae
- Tribe: Phycitini
- Genus: Metallosticha; Rebel in Staudinger & Rebel, 1901

Synonyms
- Metallosticha Hampson, 1901; Ametallosticha Amsel, 1935

Genus of moths

Metallosticha is a genus of snout moths described by Hans Rebel in 1901.

== Species ==
- Metallosticha aigneri (Amsel, 1935)
- Metallosticha argyrogrammos Zeller, 1847
- Metallosticha pamphaes (Turner, 1904)
- Metallosticha plumbeifasciella (Hampson, 1996)
