= Metallosticha argyrogrammos =

Scientific classification
- Kingdom: Animalia
- Phylum: Arthropoda
- Clade: Pancrustacea
- Class: Insecta
- Order: Lepidoptera
- Family: Pyralidae
- Genus: Metallosticha
- Species: M. argyrogrammos

Binomial name
- Metallosticha argyrogrammos (Zeller, 1847)

Synonyms
- Myelois argyrogrammos Zeller, 1847; Eurhodope ortneri Hartig, 1938

Species of moth

Metallosticha argyrogrammos is a species of snout moth. It is found in Italy, Greece, North Macedonia, Bulgaria and Romania.
