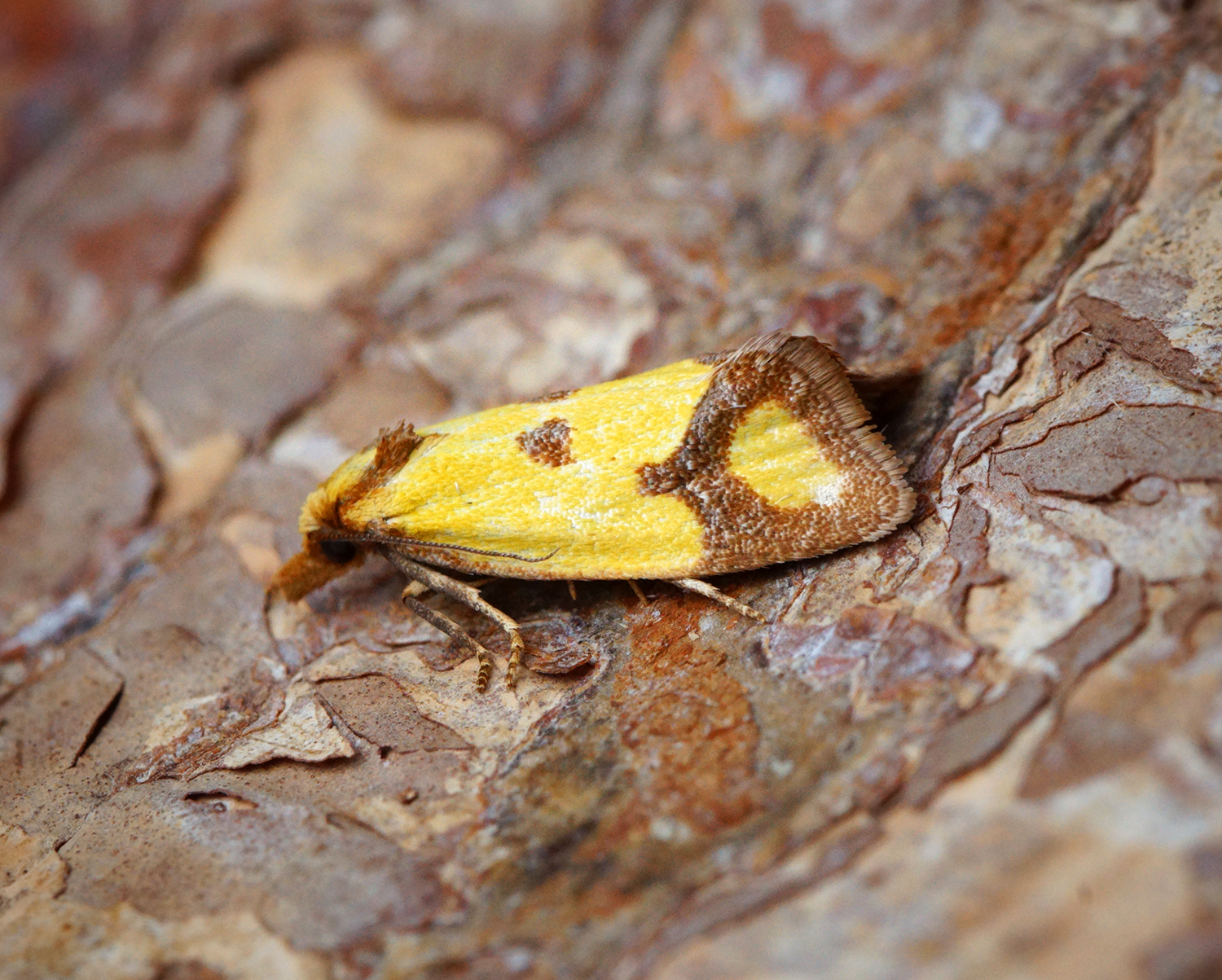
- Agapeta zoegana

Scientific classification
- Domain: Eukaryota
- Kingdom: Animalia
- Phylum: Arthropoda
- Class: Insecta
- Order: Lepidoptera
- Family: Tortricidae
- Tribe: Cochylini
- Genus: Agapeta; Hubner, 1822

Synonyms
- Aapeta [lapsus]; Agapete Hübner, 1825 [lapsus]; Apapeta Razowski, 1977 [lapsus]; Euxanthis Hübner, [1825] 1816; Xanthosetia Stephens, 1829

= Agapeta =

Genus of tortrix moths

Agapeta is a genus of moths belonging to the subfamily Tortricinae of the family Tortricidae.

== Species ==
- Agapeta angelana (Kennel, 1919)
- Agapeta hamana (Linnaeus, 1758)
- Agapeta largana (Rebel, 1906)
- Agapeta zoegana (Linnaeus, 1767) – knapweed root-borer moth

== See also ==
- List of Tortricidae genera
