= Metallosticha pamphaes =

Scientific classification
- Kingdom: Animalia
- Phylum: Arthropoda
- Class: Insecta
- Order: Lepidoptera
- Family: Pyralidae
- Genus: Metallosticha
- Species: M. pamphaes

Binomial name
- Metallosticha pamphaes (Turner, 1904)

Synonyms
- Hyphantidium pamphaes Turner, 1904; Metallosticha metallica Lower, 1905; Laspeyresia callilampetes Turner, 1946

Species of moth

Metallosticha pamphaes is a species of snout moth in the genus Metallosticha. It was described by Turner in 1904, and is known from Australia.
