= Mesciniadia otoptila =

Scientific classification
- Domain: Eukaryota
- Kingdom: Animalia
- Phylum: Arthropoda
- Class: Insecta
- Order: Lepidoptera
- Family: Pyralidae
- Subfamily: Phycitinae
- Tribe: Phycitini
- Genus: Mesciniadia
- Species: M. otoptila

Binomial name
- Mesciniadia otoptila ( Turner, 1913)

Synonyms
- Ecbletodes otoptila Turner, 1913

Species of moth

Mesciniadia otoptila is a species of snout moth in the genus Mesciniadia described by Alfred Jefferis Turner in 1913. It is found in Australia.
