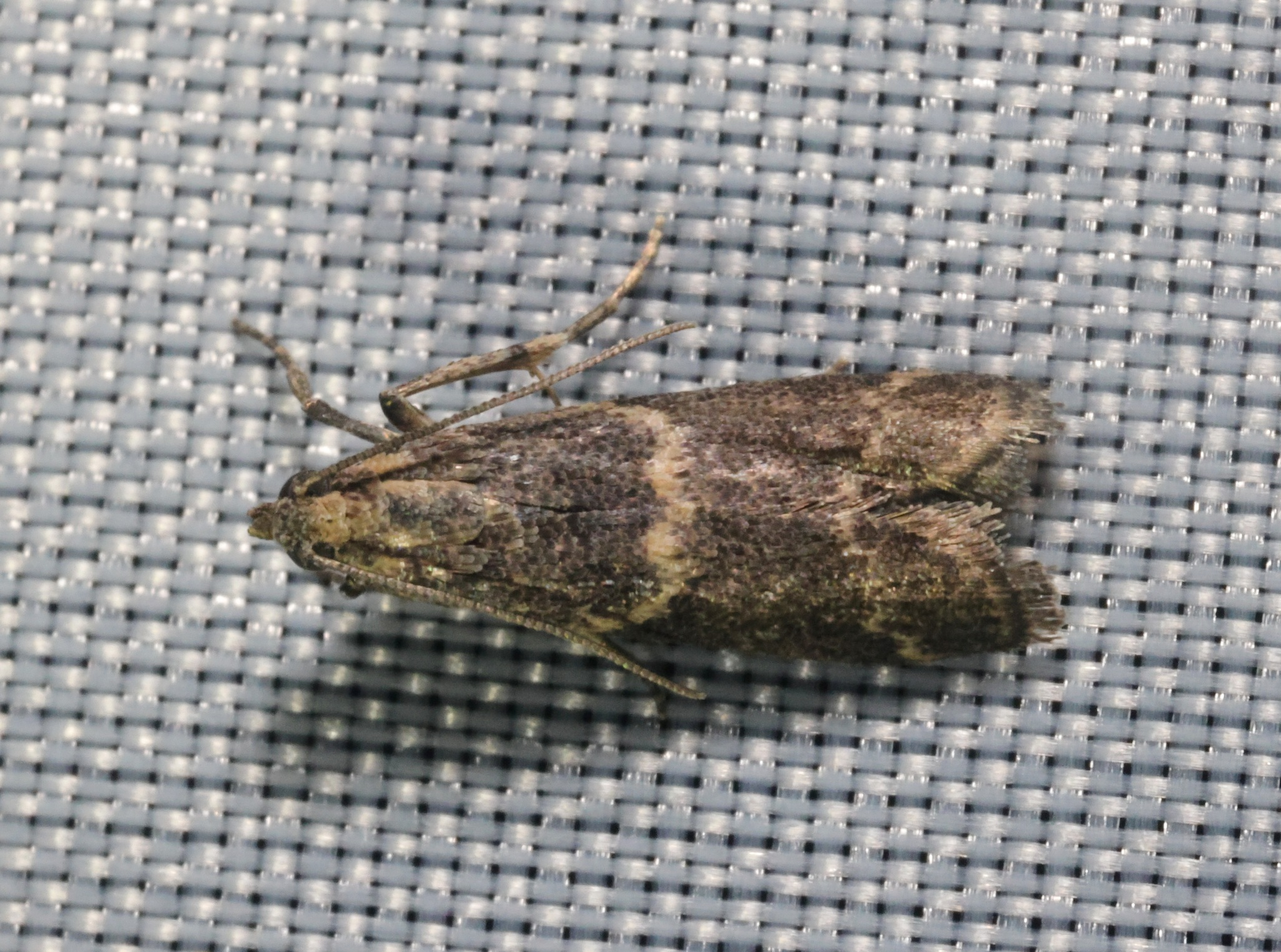
- Mesciniadia infractalis, China

Scientific classification
- Kingdom: Animalia
- Phylum: Arthropoda
- Class: Insecta
- Order: Lepidoptera
- Family: Pyralidae
- Subfamily: Phycitinae
- Tribe: Phycitini
- Genus: Mesciniadia
- Species: M. infractalis

Binomial name
- Mesciniadia infractalis ( Walker, 1864)

Synonyms
- Nephopteryx infractalis Walker, 1864

= Mesciniadia infractalis =

Species of moth

Mesciniadia infractalis is a species of snout moth in the genus Mesciniadia. It was described by Francis Walker in 1864. It is found in Australia, China, and Southeast Asia.
