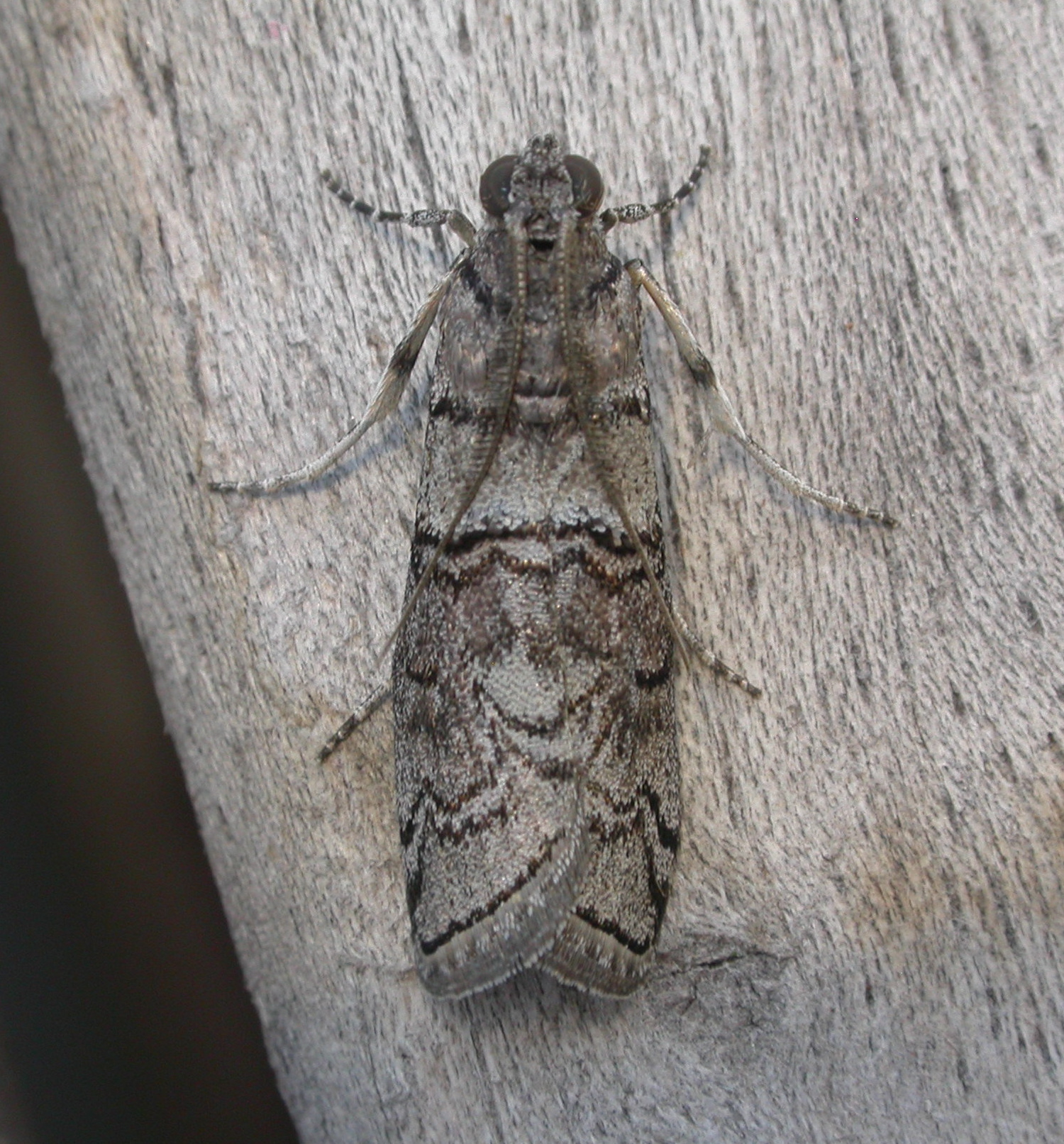
- Ctenomeristis almella imago

Scientific classification
- Kingdom: Animalia
- Phylum: Arthropoda
- Clade: Pancrustacea
- Class: Insecta
- Order: Lepidoptera
- Family: Pyralidae
- Tribe: Phycitini
- Genus: Ctenomeristis; Meyrick, 1929

Type species
- Ceroprepes almella Meyrick, 1879

= Ctenomeristis =

Genus of moths

Ctenomeristis is a genus of small moths belonging to the snout moth family (Pyralidae). They are part of the tribe Phycitini within the huge snout moth subfamily Phycitinae.

Moths of this genus can usually be distinguished from related moths by their forewing veins. They have 11 veins, with vein 7 missing altogether and veins 4 and 5 as well as 8, 9 and 10 being connected proximally.

== Species ==
Species of Ctenomeristis are:

- Ctenomeristis albata
- Ctenomeristis almella
- Ctenomeristis ebriola
- Ctenomeristis kaltenbachi
- Ctenomeristis ochrodepta Meyrick, 1929b (from Marquesas)
- Ctenomeristis paucicornuti
- Ctenomeristis sebasmia (mostly placed in Eremographa)
- Ctenomeristis shafferi
- Ctenomeristis subfuscella
- Ctenomeristis vojnitsi
