= Vinicia =

Vinicia may refer to:

- Vinicia (moth), a genus of moths in the family Pyralidae
- Vinicia (plant), a genus of plants in the family Asteraceae
