= Lasiosticha thermochroa =

Scientific classification
- Domain: Eukaryota
- Kingdom: Animalia
- Phylum: Arthropoda
- Class: Insecta
- Order: Lepidoptera
- Family: Pyralidae
- Genus: Lasiosticha
- Species: L. thermochroa

Binomial name
- Lasiosticha thermochroa (Lower, 1896)

Synonyms
- Euzophera thermochroa Lower, 1896

Species of moth

Lasiosticha thermochroa is a species of snout moth in the genus Lasiosticha. It was described by Oswald Bertram Lower in 1896 and is found in Australia.
