= Lasiosticha microcosma =

Scientific classification
- Domain: Eukaryota
- Kingdom: Animalia
- Phylum: Arthropoda
- Class: Insecta
- Order: Lepidoptera
- Family: Pyralidae
- Genus: Lasiosticha
- Species: L. microcosma

Binomial name
- Lasiosticha microcosma Lower, 1893

Species of moth

Lasiosticha microcosma is a species of snout moth in the genus Lasiosticha. It was described by Oswald Bertram Lower in 1893 and is found in Australia.
