= Ctenomeristis subfuscella =

Scientific classification
- Kingdom: Animalia
- Phylum: Arthropoda
- Class: Insecta
- Order: Lepidoptera
- Family: Pyralidae
- Genus: Ctenomeristis
- Species: C. subfuscella

Binomial name
- Ctenomeristis subfuscella (Hampson in Ragonot, 1901)

Synonyms
- Odontarthria subfuscella Hampson in Ragonot, 1901

Species of moth

Ctenomeristis subfuscella is a species of snout moth in the genus Ctenomeristis. It was described by George Hampson in 1901 and is known from Queensland, Australia.
