= Thospia =

Scientific classification
- Domain: Eukaryota
- Kingdom: Animalia
- Phylum: Arthropoda
- Class: Insecta
- Order: Lepidoptera
- Family: Pyralidae
- Subfamily: Phycitinae
- Tribe: Phycitini
- Genus: Thospia; Ragonot, 1888

Genus of moths

Thospia is a genus of snout moths. It was described by Ragonot in 1888.

== Species ==
- Thospia crassipalpella Ragonot, 1888
- Thospia feminella Roesler, 1973
- Thospia permixtella Ragonot, 1888
- Thospia trifasciella (Ragonot, 1887)
- Thospia tshetverikovi Kuznetzov, 1908
