= Lymphia =

Scientific classification
- Kingdom: Animalia
- Phylum: Arthropoda
- Class: Insecta
- Order: Lepidoptera
- Family: Pyralidae
- Tribe: Phycitini
- Genus: Lymphia; Rebel, 1901
- Species: L. chalybella

Binomial name
- Lymphia chalybella (Eversmann, 1844)

Synonyms
- Phycis chalybella Eversmann, 1844

Genus of moths

Lymphia is a genus of snout moths. It was described by Rebel in 1901. It contains only one species, Lymphia chalybella, which is found in France and Russia.
