= Ecnomoneura =

Scientific classification
- Kingdom: Animalia
- Phylum: Arthropoda
- Class: Insecta
- Order: Lepidoptera
- Family: Pyralidae
- Tribe: Phycitini
- Genus: Ecnomoneura; Turner, 1942
- Species: E. sphaerotropha

Binomial name
- Ecnomoneura sphaerotropha Turner, 1942

Genus of moths

Ecnomoneura is a monotypic snout moth genus that was described by Alfred Jefferis Turner in 1942. Its single species, described in the same publication, Ecnomoneura sphaerotropha, is found in Australia.
