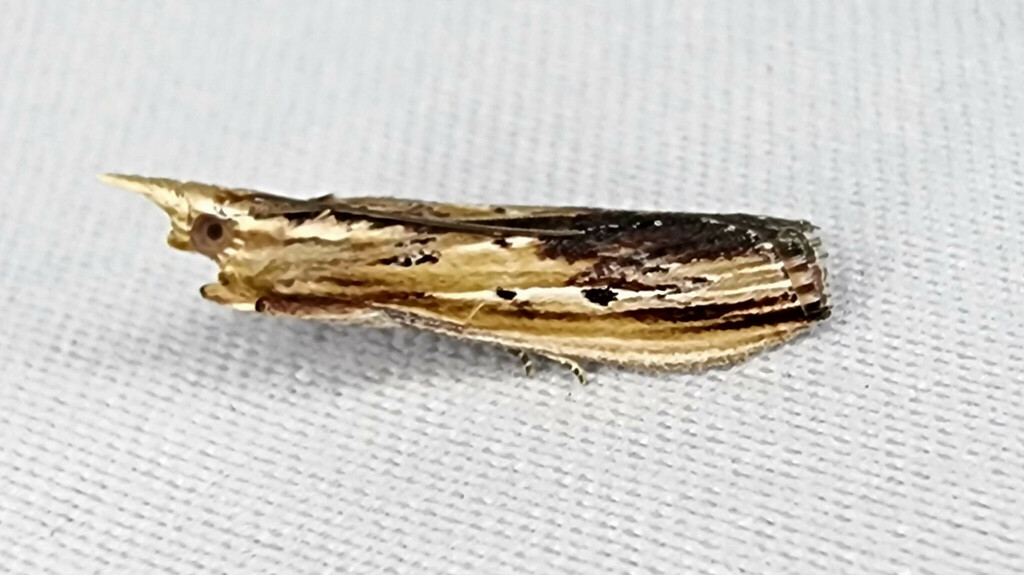

Scientific classification
- Kingdom: Animalia
- Phylum: Arthropoda
- Class: Insecta
- Order: Lepidoptera
- Family: Pyralidae
- Tribe: Phycitini
- Genus: Ancylostomia; Ragonot, 1893
- Species: A. stercorea

Binomial name
- Ancylostomia stercorea (Zeller, 1848)

Synonyms
- Myelois stercorea Zeller, 1848; Pempelia diffissella Zeller, 1881; Anerastia ignobilis Butler, 1878

= Ancylostomia =

Genus of moths

Ancylostomia is a monotypic snout moth genus described by Émile Louis Ragonot in 1893. Its one species, Ancylostomia stercorea, the pigeonpea pod borer, was described by Philipp Christoph Zeller in 1848. It is found in southern Florida, southern Texas, Cuba, Haiti, the Dominican Republic, the Virgin Islands, Jamaica, the Bahamas, Grenada, St. Kitts, Trinidad, Mexico, Guatemala, Costa Rica, Panama, Colombia, French Guiana, Brazil, Guyana, Dominica, Montserrat and Antigua.

Adults are on wing year round.

The larvae feed on Cajanus cajan, Cicer and Dolichos species. They bore into the seed cavity of their host plant.
