= Asartodes zapateri =

Scientific classification
- Domain: Eukaryota
- Kingdom: Animalia
- Phylum: Arthropoda
- Class: Insecta
- Order: Lepidoptera
- Family: Pyralidae
- Genus: Asartodes
- Species: A. zapateri

Binomial name
- Asartodes zapateri (Ragonot, 1882)

Synonyms
- Asarta zapateri Ragonot, 1882; Asarta nigrella Hampson, 1903; Asarta firusella Amsel, 1961

Species of moth

Asartodes zapateri is a species of snout moth in the genus Asartodes. It was described by Ragonot, in 1882, and is known from the Iberian Peninsula and France.
