= Ptyomaxia =

Scientific classification
- Kingdom: Animalia
- Phylum: Arthropoda
- Class: Insecta
- Order: Lepidoptera
- Family: Pyralidae
- Subfamily: Phycitinae
- Tribe: Phycitini
- Genus: Ptyomaxia; Hampson, 1903

Synonyms
- Palibothra Ragonot, 1890

Genus of moths

Ptyomaxia is a genus of snout moths. It was described by George Hampson in 1903.

== Species ==
- Ptyomaxia amaura (Lower, 1902)
- Ptyomaxia fuscogrisella Ragonot, 1890
- Ptyomaxia metasarca (Lower, 1903)
- Ptyomaxia syntaractis (Turner, 1904)
- Ptyomaxia trigonifera Hampson, 1903
- Ptyomaxia trigonogramma (Turner, 1947)
