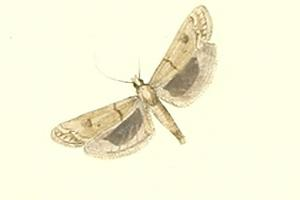
- Tephris cyriella

Scientific classification
- Domain: Eukaryota
- Kingdom: Animalia
- Phylum: Arthropoda
- Class: Insecta
- Order: Lepidoptera
- Family: Pyralidae
- Subfamily: Phycitinae
- Tribe: Phycitini
- Genus: Tephris; Ragonot, 1890

Synonyms
- Aphyletes Ragonot, 1893

= Tephris =

Genus of moths

Tephris is a genus of snout moths described by Émile Louis Ragonot in 1890.

== Species ==
- Tephris cyriella (Erschoff, 1874)
- Tephris melanochreella (Ragonot, 1887)
- Tephris nigrisparsella (Ragonot, 1887)
- Tephris ochreella Ragonot, 1893
- Tephris verruculella (Ragonot, 1887)
