= Ctenomeristis paucicornuti =

Scientific classification
- Domain: Eukaryota
- Kingdom: Animalia
- Phylum: Arthropoda
- Class: Insecta
- Order: Lepidoptera
- Family: Pyralidae
- Genus: Ctenomeristis
- Species: C. paucicornuti

Binomial name
- Ctenomeristis paucicornuti Horak, 1998

Species of moth

Ctenomeristis paucicornuti is a species of snout moth in the genus Ctenomeristis. It was described by Marianne Horak in 1998 and is known from western Australia.
