= Barbifrontia =

Scientific classification
- Kingdom: Animalia
- Phylum: Arthropoda
- Class: Insecta
- Order: Lepidoptera
- Family: Pyralidae
- Tribe: Phycitini
- Genus: Barbifrontia; Hampson in Ragonot, 1901
- Species: B. hemileucella

Binomial name
- Barbifrontia hemileucella Hampson in Ragonot, 1901

Synonyms
- Genus: Sthenobela Turner, 1904; Species: Sthenobela niphostibes Turner, 1904

Genus of moths

Barbifrontia is a monotypic snout moth genus. It was described by George Hampson in 1901 and contains the species Barbifrontia hemileucella, described in the same publication. It is found in Australia.
