= Ratasa =

Scientific classification
- Domain: Eukaryota
- Kingdom: Animalia
- Phylum: Arthropoda
- Class: Insecta
- Order: Lepidoptera
- Family: Pyralidae
- Tribe: Phycitini
- Genus: Ratasa; Herrich-Schäffer, 1849
- Species: R. alienalis

Binomial name
- Ratasa alienalis (Eversmann, 1844)

Synonyms
- Pyralis alienalis Eversmann, 1844; Pyralis noctualis Eversmann, 1842 (preocc.)

Genus of moths

Ratasa is a monotypic snout moth genus described by Gottlieb August Wilhelm Herrich-Schäffer in 1849. It contains only one species, Ratasa alienalis, described by Eduard Friedrich Eversmann in 1844, which is found in Russia.
