= Ctenomeristis vojnitsi =

Scientific classification
- Domain: Eukaryota
- Kingdom: Animalia
- Phylum: Arthropoda
- Class: Insecta
- Order: Lepidoptera
- Family: Pyralidae
- Genus: Ctenomeristis
- Species: C. vojnitsi

Binomial name
- Ctenomeristis vojnitsi Roesler, 1983

Species of moth

Ctenomeristis vojnitsi is a species of snout moth in the genus Ctenomeristis. It was described by Roesler, in 1983, and is known from Indonesia (Sumatra).
