= Ctenomeristis ebriola =

Scientific classification
- Kingdom: Animalia
- Phylum: Arthropoda
- Class: Insecta
- Order: Lepidoptera
- Family: Pyralidae
- Genus: Ctenomeristis
- Species: C. ebriola

Binomial name
- Ctenomeristis ebriola Meyrick, 1934

Species of moth

Ctenomeristis ebriola is a species of snout moth in the genus Ctenomeristis. It was described by Edward Meyrick in 1934 and is known from Sri Lanka.
