= Cryptomyelois glaucobasis =

Scientific classification
- Kingdom: Animalia
- Phylum: Arthropoda
- Class: Insecta
- Order: Lepidoptera
- Family: Pyralidae
- Genus: Cryptomyelois
- Species: C. glaucobasis

Binomial name
- Cryptomyelois glaucobasis (Lower, 1903)

Synonyms
- Tephris glaucobasis Lower, 1903

Species of moth

Cryptomyelois glaucobasis is a species of snout moth in the genus Cryptomyelois. It was described by Oswald Bertram Lower and is found in Australia.
