= Asartodes =

Scientific classification
- Domain: Eukaryota
- Kingdom: Animalia
- Phylum: Arthropoda
- Class: Insecta
- Order: Lepidoptera
- Family: Pyralidae
- Subfamily: Phycitinae
- Tribe: Phycitini
- Genus: Asartodes; Ragonot, 1893

Synonyms
- Compsoteles Meyrick, 1935

Genus of moths

Asartodes is a genus of snout moths. It was described by Émile Louis Ragonot in 1893 and is known from France and Spain.

== Species ==
- Asartodes monspesulalis
- Asartodes zapateri
