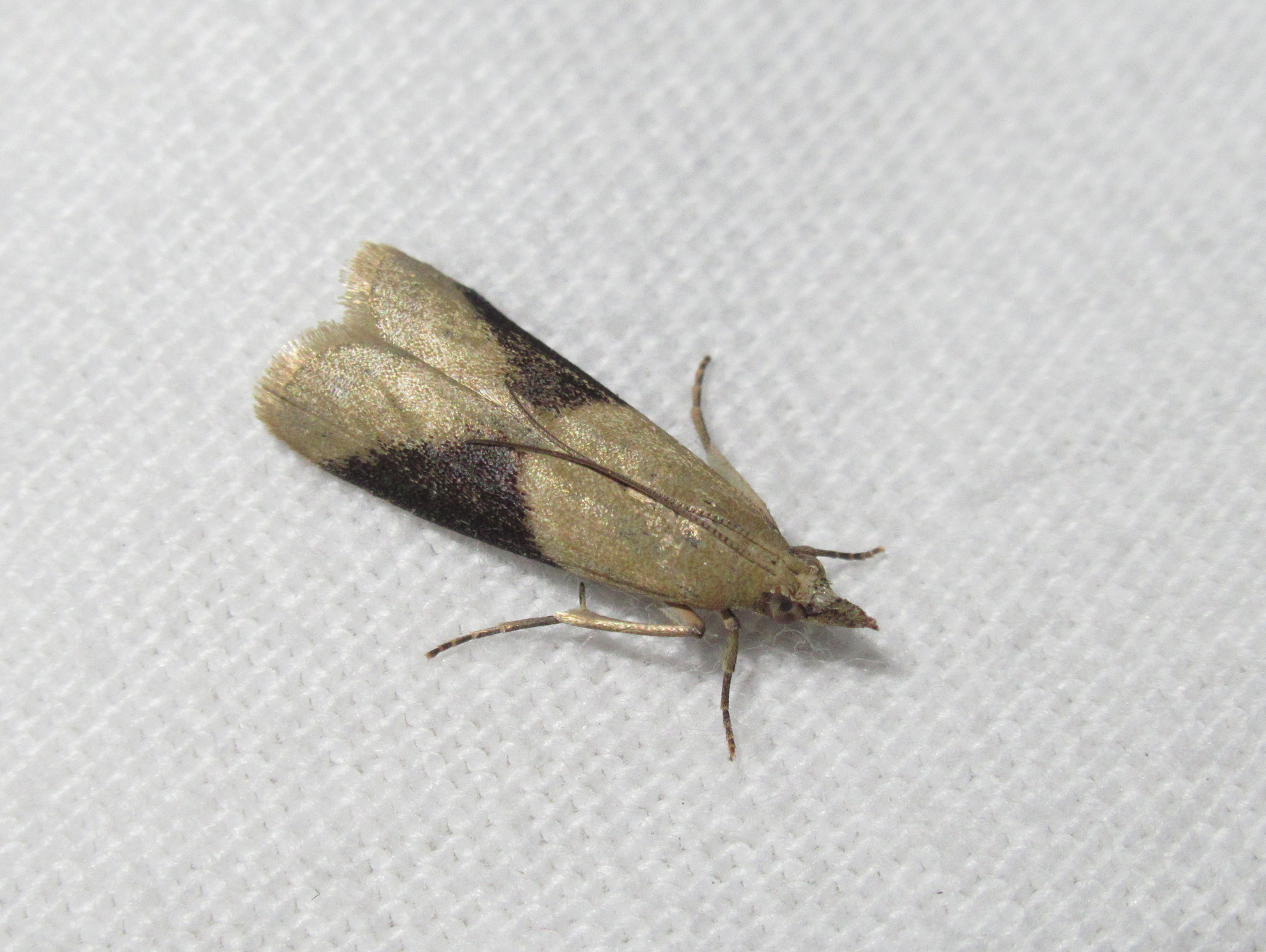

Scientific classification
- Kingdom: Animalia
- Phylum: Arthropoda
- Clade: Pancrustacea
- Class: Insecta
- Order: Lepidoptera
- Family: Pyralidae
- Genus: Ptyomaxia
- Species: P. trigonogramma

Binomial name
- Ptyomaxia trigonogramma (Turner, 1947)

Synonyms
- Carposina trigonogramma Turner, 1947

= Ptyomaxia trigonogramma =

Species of moth

Ptyomaxia trigonogramma is a moth of the family Pyralidae first described by Alfred Jefferis Turner in 1947. It is known from Australia and New Zealand.
