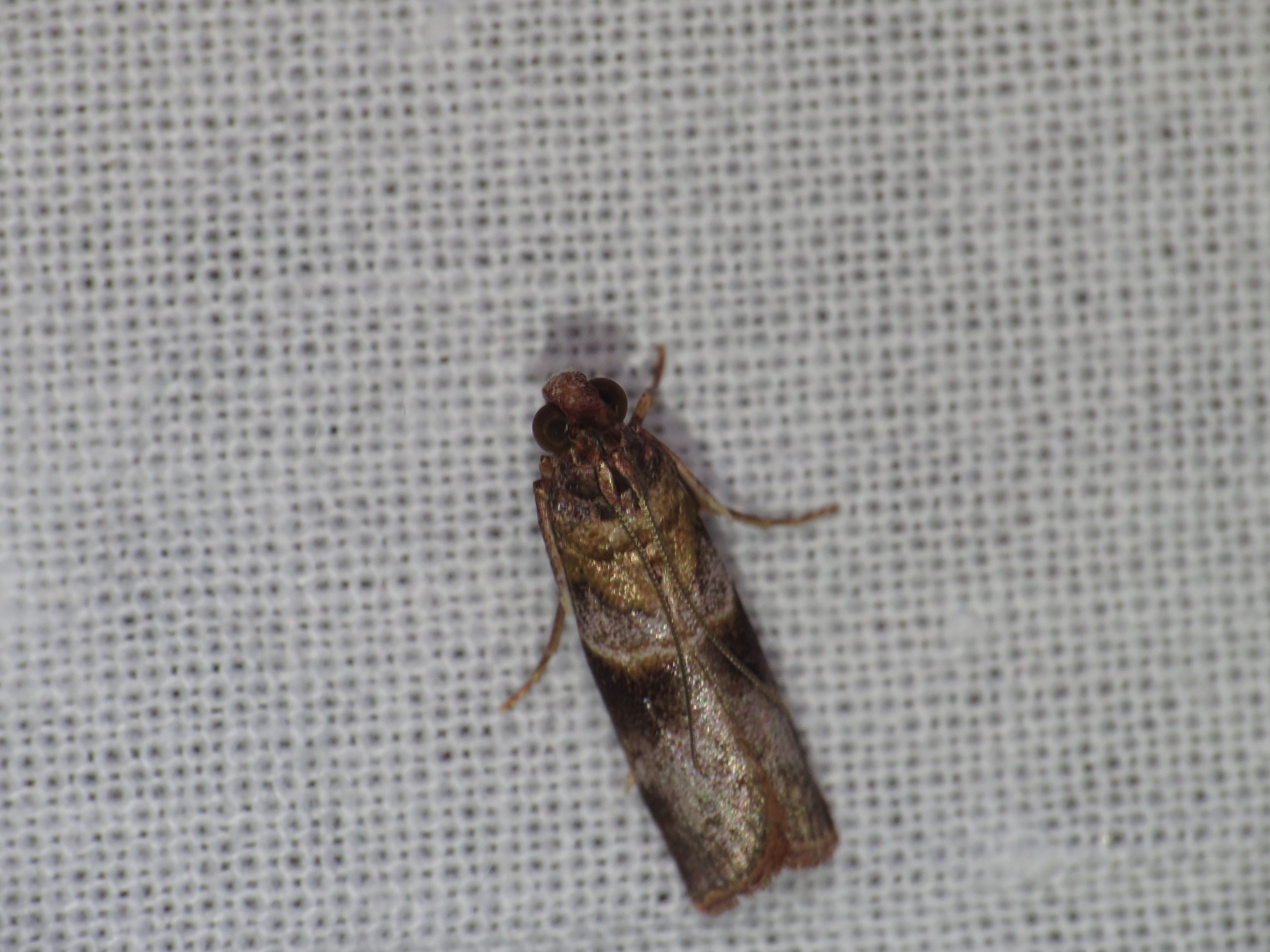
- Calguia defiguralis

Scientific classification
- Kingdom: Animalia
- Phylum: Arthropoda
- Class: Insecta
- Order: Lepidoptera
- Family: Pyralidae
- Subfamily: Phycitinae
- Tribe: Phycitini
- Genus: Calguia; Walker, 1863

Type species
- Calguia defiguralis Walker, 1863

Synonyms
- Cabragus Moore, 1886; Sigmarthria Ragonot, 1888

= Calguia =

Genus of moths

Calguia is a genus of snout moths. It was erected by Walker, in 1863, and is known from Japan.

== Species ==
- Calguia defiguralis Walker, 1863
- Calguia deltophora (Lower, 1903)
- Calguia rufobrunnealis Yamanaka, 2006
