= Thospia feminella =

Scientific classification
- Domain: Eukaryota
- Kingdom: Animalia
- Phylum: Arthropoda
- Class: Insecta
- Order: Lepidoptera
- Family: Pyralidae
- Genus: Thospia
- Species: T. feminella

Binomial name
- Thospia feminella Roesler, 1973

Species of moth

Thospia feminella is a species of snout moth in the genus Thospia. It was described by Roesler in 1973. It is found in Afghanistan.
