= Lasiosticha antelia =

Scientific classification
- Kingdom: Animalia
- Phylum: Arthropoda
- Class: Insecta
- Order: Lepidoptera
- Family: Pyralidae
- Genus: Lasiosticha
- Species: L. antelia

Binomial name
- Lasiosticha antelia (Meyrick, 1885)

Synonyms
- Lasiocera antelia Meyrick, 1885

Species of moth

Lasiosticha antelia is a species of snout moth in the genus Lasiosticha. It was described by Edward Meyrick in 1885. It is found in Australia.
