= Asartodes monspesulalis =

Scientific classification
- Domain: Eukaryota
- Kingdom: Animalia
- Phylum: Arthropoda
- Class: Insecta
- Order: Lepidoptera
- Family: Pyralidae
- Genus: Asartodes
- Species: A. monspesulalis

Binomial name
- Asartodes monspesulalis (Duponchel, 1833)

Synonyms
- Ennichia monspesulalis Duponchel, 1833; Asarta aethiopella var. monspessulella Herrich-Schäffer, 1849; Asarta pyrenaica Hampson, 1929; Chionea culminella Guenée, 1845; Chionea frigidella Guenée, 1845; Asarta monspesulalis rubricosella Staudinger, 1863; Asarta korbi Caradja, 1910; Compsoteles heliochyta Meyrick, 1935

Species of moth

Asartodes monspesulalis is a species of snout moth in the genus Asartodes. It was described by Philogène Auguste Joseph Duponchel in 1833 and is known from France and the Iberian Peninsula.

The wingspan is 14–19 mm. Adults are brownish grey. The hindwings are dark brownish grey with whitish striations in males.
