= Pseudacrobasis =

Scientific classification
- Domain: Eukaryota
- Kingdom: Animalia
- Phylum: Arthropoda
- Class: Insecta
- Order: Lepidoptera
- Family: Pyralidae
- Tribe: Phycitini; Roesler, 1975
- Genus: Pseudacrobasis

Genus of moths

Pseudacrobasis is a genus of snout moths.

== Species ==
- Pseudacrobasis dilatata Ren & Li, 2016 (from China)
- Pseudacrobasis tergestella (Ragonot, 1901) (jr.syn. Pseudacrobasis nankingella Roesler, 1975) (from Europe, Japan, China, Korea, Russia)
