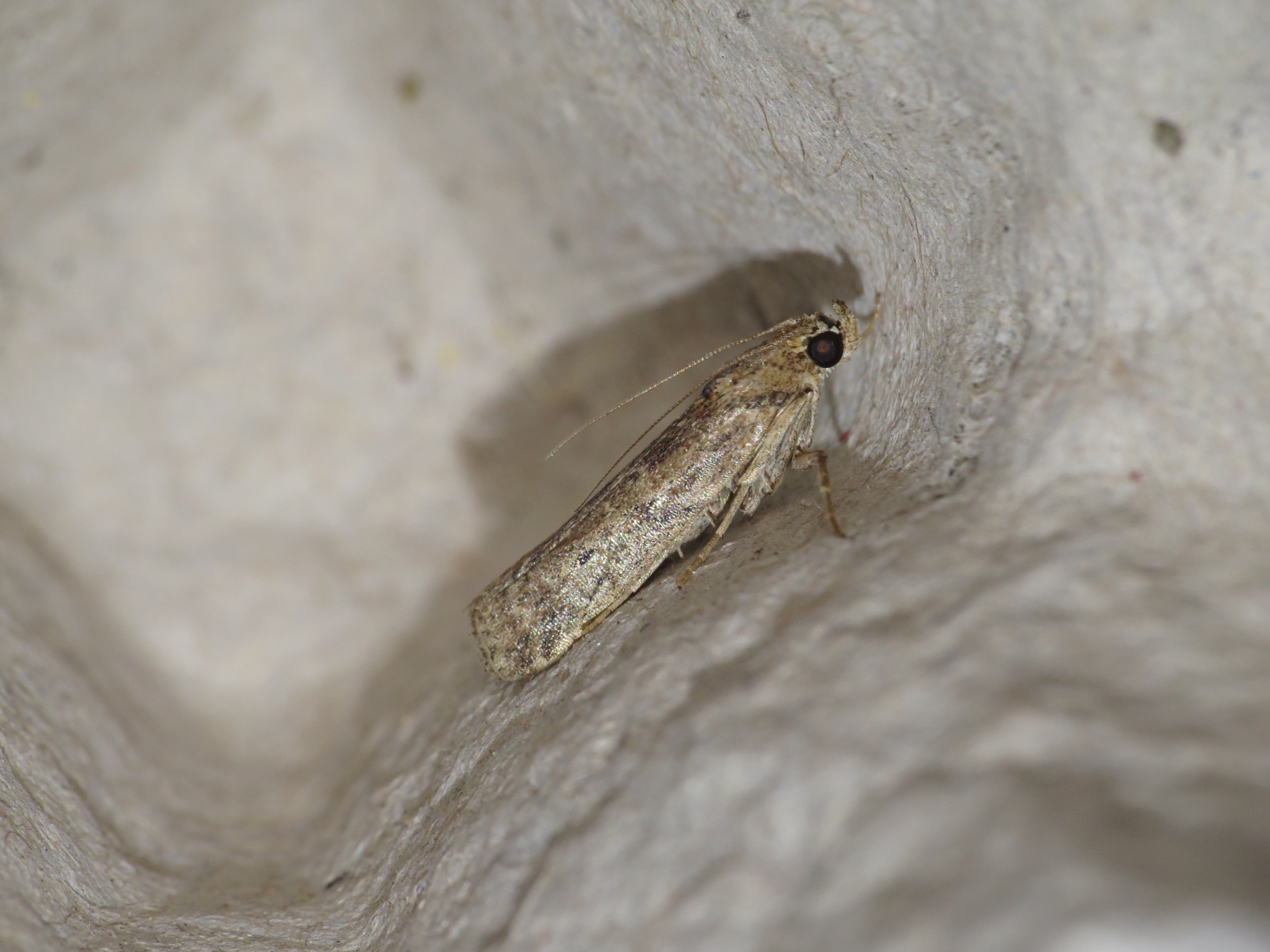
- Meyrickiella homosema

Scientific classification
- Kingdom: Animalia
- Phylum: Arthropoda
- Class: Insecta
- Order: Lepidoptera
- Family: Pyralidae
- Tribe: Phycitini
- Genus: Meyrickiella; Hampson in Ragonot, 1901
- Species: M. homosema

Binomial name
- Meyrickiella homosema (Meyrick, 1887)

Synonyms
- Genus: Meyrickialis Hampson 1930; Species: Hypophana homosema Meyrick, 1887

= Meyrickiella =

Genus of moths

Meyrickiella is a monotypic snout moth genus described by George Hampson in 1901. Its single species, Meyrickiella homosema, was described by Edward Meyrick in 1887. It is found in Australia.
