= Ctenomeristis ochrodepta =

Scientific classification
- Kingdom: Animalia
- Phylum: Arthropoda
- Class: Insecta
- Order: Lepidoptera
- Family: Pyralidae
- Genus: Ctenomeristis
- Species: C. ochrodepta

Binomial name
- Ctenomeristis ochrodepta Meyrick, 1929

Species of moth

Ctenomeristis ochrodepta is a species of snout moth in the genus Ctenomeristis. It was described by Edward Meyrick in 1929, and is known from the Marquesas islands and Sumatra (Indonesia). This species has a wingspan of 15–17 mm.
