= Tephris ochreella =

Scientific classification
- Domain: Eukaryota
- Kingdom: Animalia
- Phylum: Arthropoda
- Class: Insecta
- Order: Lepidoptera
- Family: Pyralidae
- Genus: Tephris
- Species: T. ochreella

Binomial name
- Tephris ochreella Ragonot, 1893

Synonyms
- Tephris ochreella perlucidella Ragonot, 1893; Tephris diversella Amsel, 1951; Tephris joannisella D. Lucas, 1909; Tephris veruculella aridiella Rothschild, 1913

Species of moth

Tephris ochreella is a species of moth in the family Pyralidae. It was described by Ragonot in 1893. It is found in Algeria, Tunisia, the Palestinian Territories, Iran and Pakistan.
