= Tephris nigrisparsella =

Scientific classification
- Domain: Eukaryota
- Kingdom: Animalia
- Phylum: Arthropoda
- Class: Insecta
- Order: Lepidoptera
- Family: Pyralidae
- Genus: Tephris
- Species: T. nigrisparsella

Binomial name
- Tephris nigrisparsella (Ragonot, 1887)

Synonyms
- Salebria nigrisparsella Ragonot, 1887; Aphyletes nigrisparsella

Species of moth

Tephris nigrisparsella is a species of moth in the family Pyralidae. It was described by Ragonot in 1887. It is found in Russia and Kazakhstan.
