= Michaeliodes =

Scientific classification
- Kingdom: Animalia
- Phylum: Arthropoda
- Class: Insecta
- Order: Lepidoptera
- Family: Pyralidae
- Tribe: Phycitini
- Genus: Michaeliodes; Roesler, 1969
- Species: M. friesei

Binomial name
- Michaeliodes friesei Roesler, 1969

Genus of moths

Michaeliodes is a genus of snout moths. It was described by Roesler in 1969. It contains only one species, Michaeliodes friesei, which is found in Albania and Greece.
