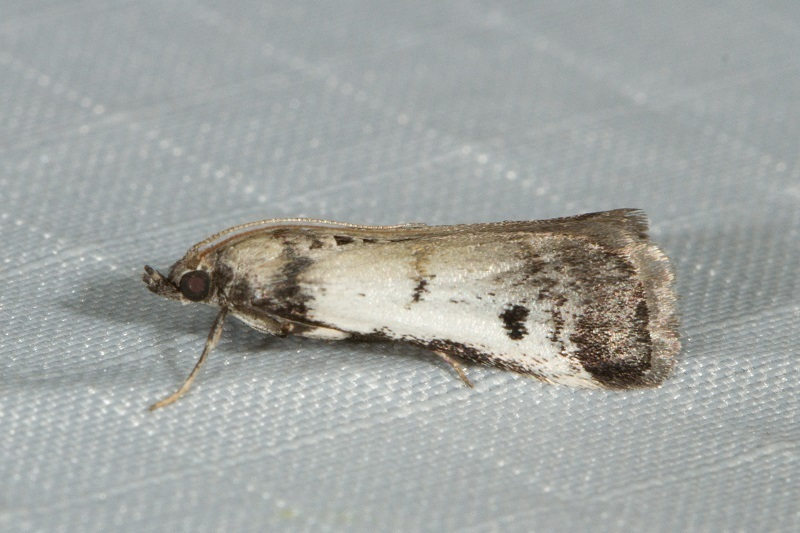

Scientific classification
- Domain: Eukaryota
- Kingdom: Animalia
- Phylum: Arthropoda
- Class: Insecta
- Order: Lepidoptera
- Family: Pyralidae
- Genus: Creobota
- Species: C. grossipunctella

Binomial name
- Creobota grossipunctella (Ragonot, 1888)

Synonyms
- Myelois grossipunctella Ragonot, 1888; Creobota coccophthora Turner, 1931

= Creobota grossipunctella =

Species of moth

Creobota grossipunctella is a species of snout moth in the genus Creobota. It was described by Émile Louis Ragonot in 1888 and is known from Australia.
