= Asclerobia sinensis =

Scientific classification
- Kingdom: Animalia
- Phylum: Arthropoda
- Class: Insecta
- Order: Lepidoptera
- Family: Pyralidae
- Genus: Asclerobia
- Species: A. sinensis

Binomial name
- Asclerobia sinensis (Caradja & Meyrick, 1937)

Synonyms
- Sclerobia sinensis Caradja & Meyrick, 1937

Species of moth

Asclerobia sinensis is a species of snout moth in the genus Asclerobia. It was described by Aristide Caradja and Edward Meyrick in 1937 and is known to be found in China.
