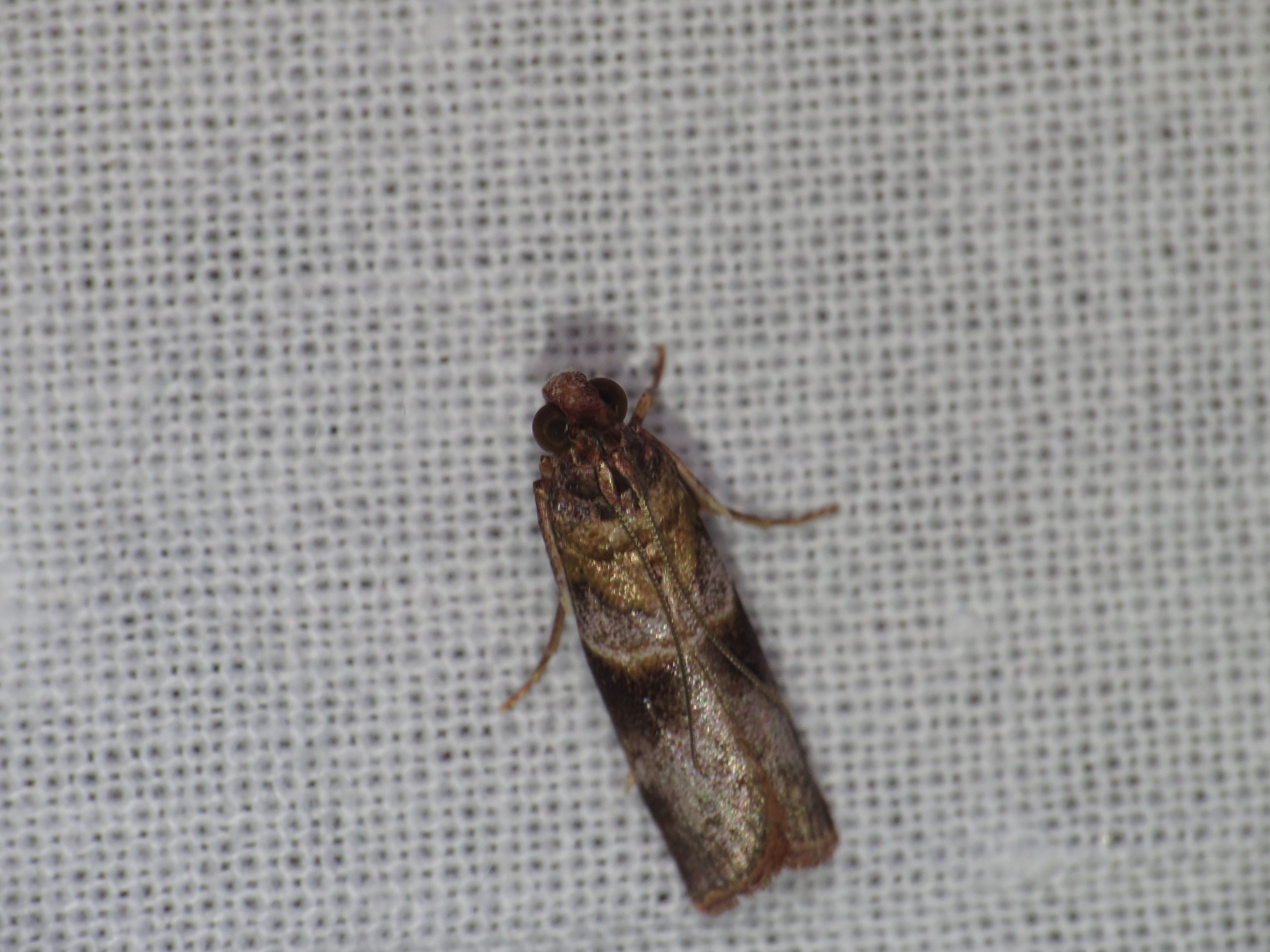

Scientific classification
- Kingdom: Animalia
- Phylum: Arthropoda
- Class: Insecta
- Order: Lepidoptera
- Family: Pyralidae
- Genus: Calguia
- Species: C. defiguralis

Binomial name
- Calguia defiguralis Walker, 1863

Synonyms
- Cabragus auritipalpus Moore, [1886]; Sigmarthria palpella Ragonot, 1888; Nephopteryx bistriella Pagenstecher, 1900; Salebria crocogastra Meyrick, 1934

= Calguia defiguralis =

Species of moth

Calguia defiguralis is a species of snout moth in the genus Calguia. It was described by Francis Walker in 1863. It is found in Borneo and Guangdong, China. It has also been recorded from Australia, Sri Lanka and Taiwan.
