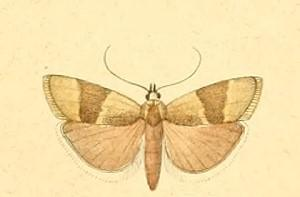

Scientific classification
- Domain: Eukaryota
- Kingdom: Animalia
- Phylum: Arthropoda
- Class: Insecta
- Order: Lepidoptera
- Family: Pyralidae
- Tribe: Phycitini
- Genus: Pterothrixidia; Amsel, 1954
- Species: P. rufella

Binomial name
- Pterothrixidia rufella (Duponchel, 1836)

Synonyms
- Genus: Pterothrix Ragonot, 1888; Species: Phycis rufella Duponchel, 1836; Myelois crudella Zeller, 1848; Myelois infuscatella Herrich-Schäffer, 1849; Myelois lucidatella Zeller, 1848; Myelois luridatella Herrich-Schäffer, 1847; Myelois lucidatella Zeller, 1848; Oncocera luridella Guenée, 1845; Phycis impurella Duponchel, 1837; Pterothrix corsicella Ragonot, 1893; Phycis rufella squalidella Eversmann, 1842; Myelois xanthocephala Staudinger, 1870; Myelois contectella Zeller, 1848; Myelois crudella var. tauricella Wocke, 1971; Myelois fimbriatella Zeller, 1848; Pterothrix caucasiella Ragonot, 1888; Pterothrix melanoptera Rebel, 1910; Pterothrix orientella Ragonot, 1893; Pterothrixidia ancyrensis Amsel, 1954; Pterothrixidia fordi Amsel, 1954; Pterothrixidia fordi rava Amsel, 1954; Pterothrixidia osmanella Amsel, 1954; Pterothrixidia impurella; Pterothrixidia contectella; Pterothrixidia caucasiella

= Pterothrixidia =

Genus of moths

Pterothrixidia is a monotypic snout moth genus described by Hans Georg Amsel in 1954. Its one species, described by Philogène Auguste Joseph Duponchel in 1836, is Pterothrixidia rufella. It is found in France, Spain, Switzerland, Italy, the Balkan Peninsula, Ukraine, Russia, Kazakhstan, Turkey and Iran.

The wingspan is about 27–28 mm.
