= Sudaniola =

Scientific classification
- Kingdom: Animalia
- Phylum: Arthropoda
- Class: Insecta
- Order: Lepidoptera
- Family: Pyralidae
- Tribe: Phycitini
- Genus: Sudaniola; Roesler, 1973
- Species: S. remanella

Binomial name
- Sudaniola remanella Roesler, 1973

Genus of moths

Sudaniola is a genus of snout moths. It was described by Roesler in 1973. It contains only one species Sudaniola remanella, which is found in Spain and Sudan.
