= Ammatucha piti =

Scientific classification
- Domain: Eukaryota
- Kingdom: Animalia
- Phylum: Arthropoda
- Class: Insecta
- Order: Lepidoptera
- Family: Pyralidae
- Genus: Ammatucha
- Species: A. piti

Binomial name
- Ammatucha piti Roesler, 1983

Species of moth

Ammatucha piti is a species of snout moth in the genus Ammatucha. It was described by Roesler, in 1983, and is known from Sumatra.
