= Paramaxillaria =

Scientific classification
- Kingdom: Animalia
- Phylum: Arthropoda
- Clade: Pancrustacea
- Class: Insecta
- Order: Lepidoptera
- Family: Pyralidae
- Tribe: Phycitini
- Genus: Paramaxillaria; H. Inoue, 1955

Synonyms
- Maxillaria Staudinger, 1879

Genus of moths

Paramaxillaria is a genus of moths of the family Pyralidae erected by H. Inoue in 1955.

== Species ==
- Paramaxillaria amatrix (Zerny, 1927)
- Paramaxillaria meretrix (Staudinger, 1879)
