= Anonaepestis tamsi =

Scientific classification
- Domain: Eukaryota
- Kingdom: Animalia
- Phylum: Arthropoda
- Class: Insecta
- Order: Lepidoptera
- Family: Pyralidae
- Genus: Anonaepestis
- Species: A. tamsi

Binomial name
- Anonaepestis tamsi Bradley, 1965

Species of moth

Anonaepestis tamsi is a species of snout moth in the genus Anonaepestis. It was described by John David Bradley in 1965 and is known from Cameroon and the Central African Republic.

The larvae feed on Piper nigrum. They bore the stem of their host plant.
