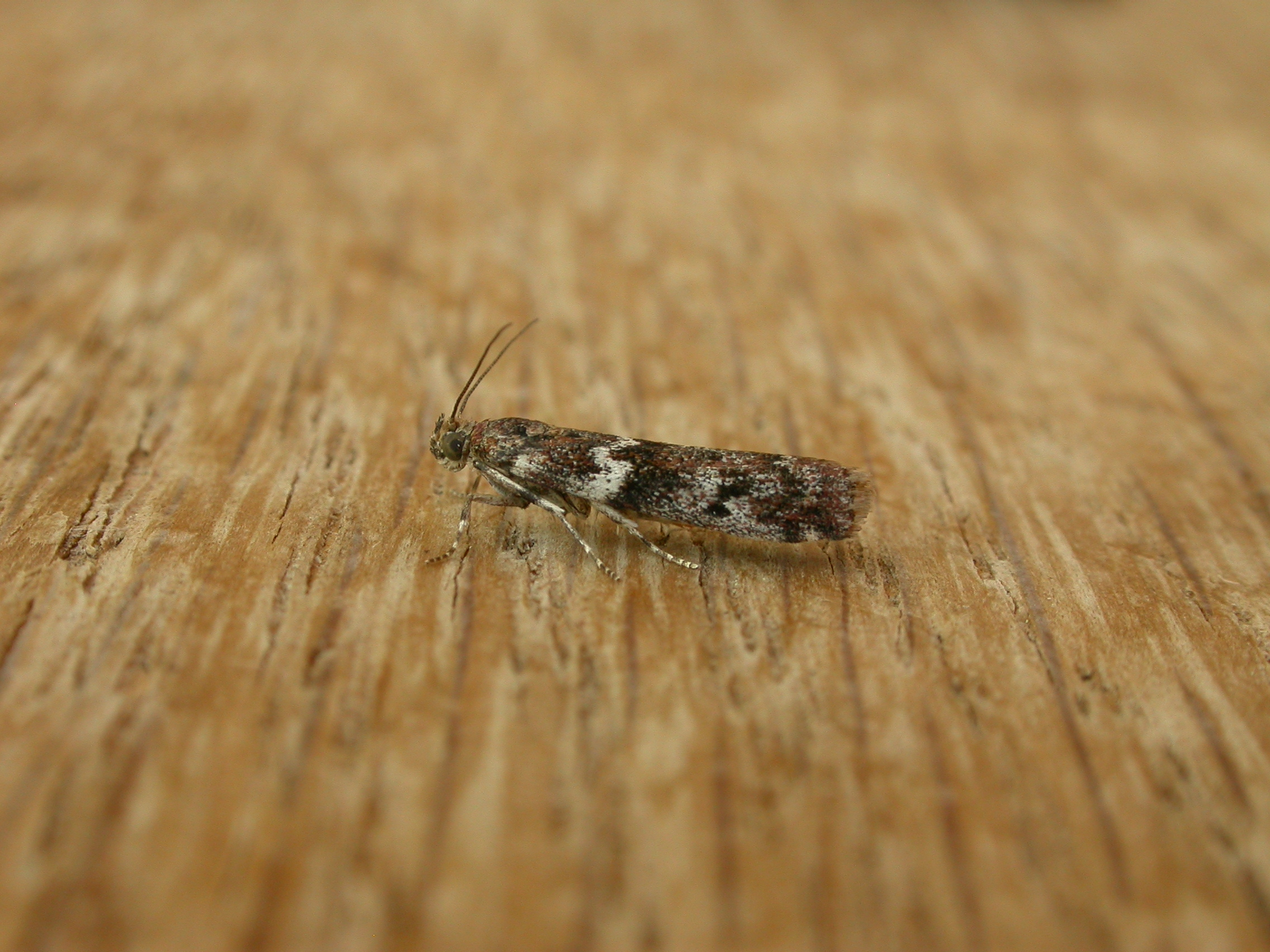

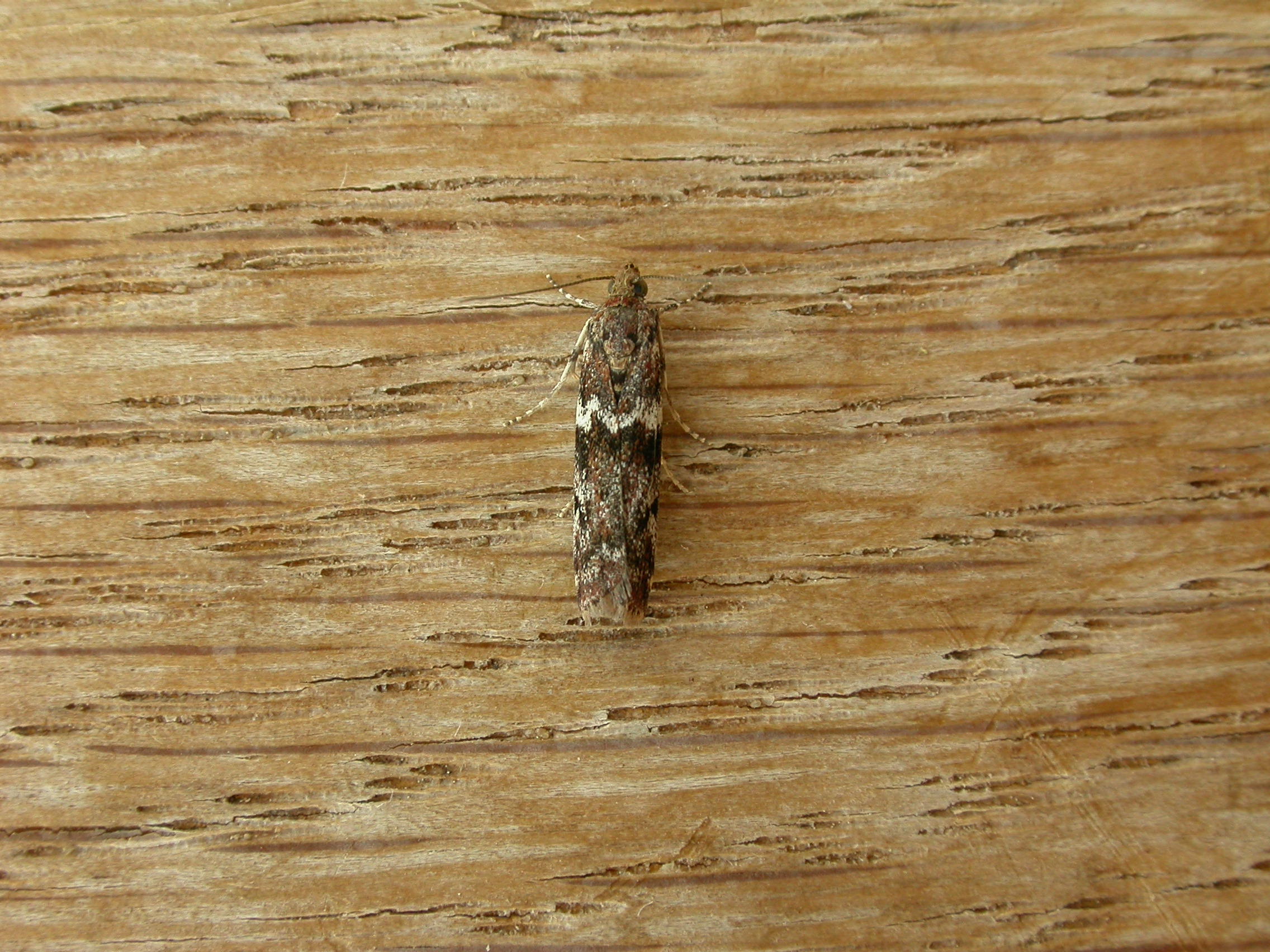

Scientific classification
- Kingdom: Animalia
- Phylum: Arthropoda
- Class: Insecta
- Order: Lepidoptera
- Family: Pyralidae
- Tribe: Phycitini
- Genus: Ephestiopsis; Ragonot, 1893
- Species: E. oenobarella

Binomial name
- Ephestiopsis oenobarella (Meyrick, 1879)

Synonyms
- Myelois oenobarella Meyrick, 1879

= Ephestiopsis =

Species of moth

Ephestiopsis oenobarella is a moth of the family Pyralidae. It is known from Australia. It has also been introduced into New Zealand.
