= Ammatucha =

Scientific classification
- Domain: Eukaryota
- Kingdom: Animalia
- Phylum: Arthropoda
- Class: Insecta
- Order: Lepidoptera
- Family: Pyralidae
- Tribe: Phycitini
- Genus: Ammatucha; Turner, 1922

Synonyms
- Sumatraphycis Roesler & Küppers, 1979

Genus of moths

Ammatucha is a genus of snout moths. It was erected by Turner, in 1922, and is known from Australia, China, Sumatra, Bhutan and Nágas.

== Species ==
- Ammatucha brevilepigera Ren & Li, 2006
- Ammatucha flavipalpa Ren & Li, 2006
- Ammatucha longilepigera Ren & Li, 2006
- Ammatucha piti Roesler, 1983
- Ammatucha porisada (Roesler & Küppers, 1979)
- Ammatucha semiirrorella (Hampson, 1896)
