= Anonaepestis =

Scientific classification
- Domain: Eukaryota
- Kingdom: Animalia
- Phylum: Arthropoda
- Class: Insecta
- Order: Lepidoptera
- Family: Pyralidae
- Tribe: Phycitini
- Genus: Anonaepestis; Ragonot, 1894

Genus of moths

Anonaepestis is a genus of snout moths. It was erected by Émile Louis Ragonot in 1894.

== Species ==
- Anonaepestis bengalella Ragonot, 1894 (from India to Australia)
- Anonaepestis tamsi Bradley, 1965 (from Cameroon and the Central African Republic)
