= Hansreisseria =

Scientific classification
- Kingdom: Animalia
- Phylum: Arthropoda
- Clade: Pancrustacea
- Class: Insecta
- Order: Lepidoptera
- Family: Pyralidae
- Tribe: Phycitini
- Genus: Hansreisseria; Roesler, 1973
- Species: H. gilvescens

Binomial name
- Hansreisseria gilvescens (Rebel, 1917)

Synonyms
- Scoparia gilvescens Rebel, 1917

Genus of moths

Hansreisseria is a genus of snout moths. It was described by Roesler in 1973. It contains only one species Hansreisseria gilvescens, which is found on the Canary Islands.
