= Echinocereta =

Scientific classification
- Kingdom: Animalia
- Phylum: Arthropoda
- Class: Insecta
- Order: Lepidoptera
- Family: Pyralidae
- Tribe: Phycitini
- Genus: Echinocereta; Neunzig, 1997
- Species: E. strigalis

Binomial name
- Echinocereta strigalis (Barnes & McDunnough, 1912)

Synonyms
- Euzophera strigalis Barnes & McDunnough, 1912; Zophodia strigalis; Cactobrosis strigalis

Genus of moths

Echinocereta is a monotypic snout moth genus described by Herbert H. Neunzig in 1997. The genus contains only one species, Echinocereta strigalis, described by William Barnes and James Halliday McDunnough in 1912, which is found in the US states of Arizona, California, Texas, Utah and in Mexico.

The wingspan is 30–43 mm for males and 33–44 mm for females.

The larvae feed on Echinocereus species, including Echinocereus pectinatus.
