= Cathyalia nishizawai =

Scientific classification
- Kingdom: Animalia
- Phylum: Arthropoda
- Class: Insecta
- Order: Lepidoptera
- Family: Pyralidae
- Genus: Cathyalia
- Species: C. nishizawai

Binomial name
- Cathyalia nishizawai Yamanaka, 2004

Species of moth

Cathyalia nishizawai is a species of snout moth in the genus Cathyalia. It was described by Hiroshi Yamanaka in 2004 and is known from Japan.
