= Exguiana postflavida =

Scientific classification
- Kingdom: Animalia
- Phylum: Arthropoda
- Class: Insecta
- Order: Lepidoptera
- Family: Pyralidae
- Genus: Exguiana
- Species: E. postflavida

Binomial name
- Exguiana postflavida Dyar, 1923

Synonyms
- Euzophera postflavida Dyar, 1923

Species of moth

Exguiana postflavida is a species of snout moth in the genus Exguiana. It was described by Harrison Gray Dyar Jr. in 1923, and is known from French Guiana.
