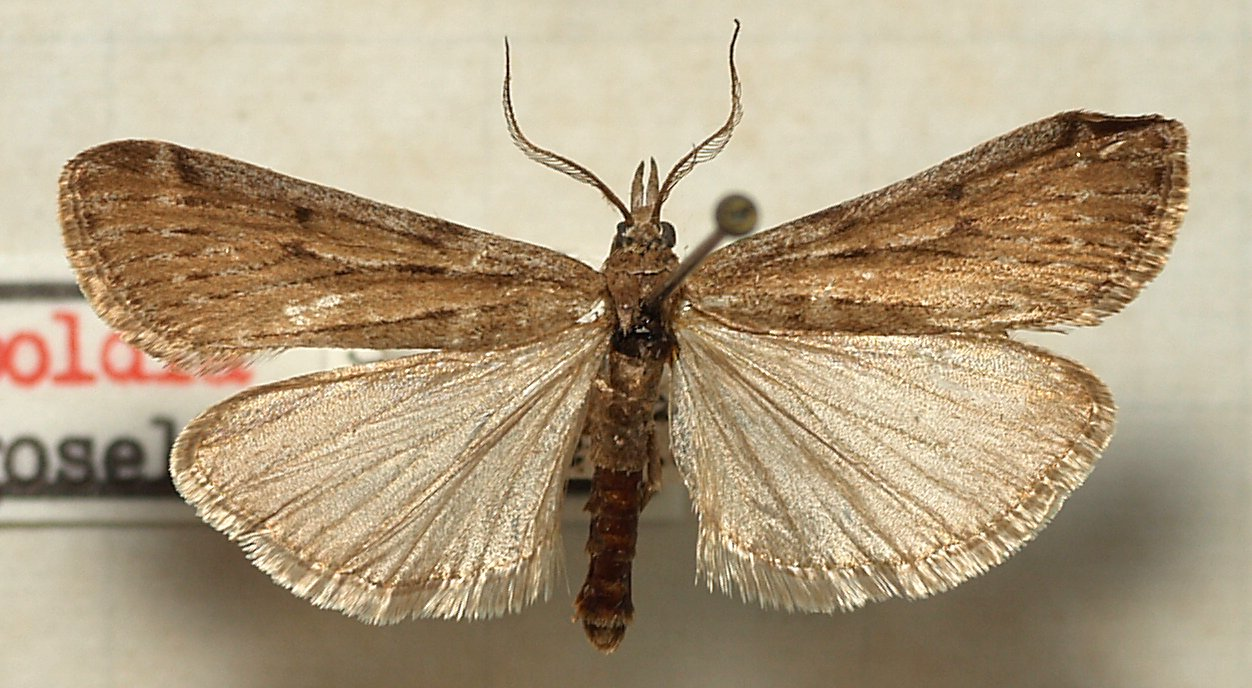

Scientific classification
- Domain: Eukaryota
- Kingdom: Animalia
- Phylum: Arthropoda
- Class: Insecta
- Order: Lepidoptera
- Family: Pyralidae
- Tribe: Phycitini
- Genus: Seeboldia; Ragonot, 1887
- Species: S. korgosella

Binomial name
- Seeboldia korgosella Ragonot, 1887

Synonyms
- Seeboldia korgosella var. uralskella Caradja, 1910; Seeboldia occidentella Zerny, 1927; Selagia jolanella Schmidt, 1933

= Seeboldia =

Seeboldia korgosella

Genus of moths

Seeboldia is a genus of moths. Its only member is Seeboldia korgosella, a moth of the family Pyralidae. It is found in Europe, including France, Spain, Albania and Russia.
