= Paramaxillaria amatrix =

Scientific classification
- Domain: Eukaryota
- Kingdom: Animalia
- Phylum: Arthropoda
- Class: Insecta
- Order: Lepidoptera
- Family: Pyralidae
- Genus: Paramaxillaria
- Species: P. amatrix

Binomial name
- Paramaxillaria amatrix (Zerny, 1927)

Synonyms
- Maxillaria amatrix Zerny, 1927

Species of moth

Paramaxillaria amatrix is a species of snout moth described by Hans Zerny in 1927. It is found in Spain.
