= Cathyalia =

Scientific classification
- Domain: Eukaryota
- Kingdom: Animalia
- Phylum: Arthropoda
- Class: Insecta
- Order: Lepidoptera
- Family: Pyralidae
- Tribe: Phycitini
- Genus: Cathyalia; Ragonot, 1888

Genus of moths

Cathyalia is a genus of snout moths. It was erected by Émile Louis Ragonot in 1888.

== Species ==
- Cathyalia edidiehlia Roesler & Küppers, 1981 (Sumatra)
- Cathyalia fulvella Ragonot, 1888 (India, Sri Lanka, Birma, Australia)
- Cathyalia gisela Roesler & Küppers, 1981 (Sumatra)
- Cathyalia nishizawai Yamanaka, 2004
- Cathyalia okinawana Yamanaka, 2003
- Cathyalia pallicostalis Roesler & Küppers, 1981 (Sumatra)
- Cathyalia pulchrotinctella Leraut, 2019 (Madagascar)
