= Lophothoracia orthozona =

Scientific classification
- Domain: Eukaryota
- Kingdom: Animalia
- Phylum: Arthropoda
- Class: Insecta
- Order: Lepidoptera
- Family: Pyralidae
- Genus: Lophothoracia
- Species: L. orthozona

Binomial name
- Lophothoracia orthozona (Lower 1903)

Synonyms
- Nephopteryx orthozona Lower, 1903

Species of moth

Lophothoracia orthozona is a species of snout moth in the genus Lophothoracia. It was described by Oswald Bertram Lower in 1903. It is found in Australia, including Queensland.

The forewings are grey mixed with whitish with a very few scattered blackish scales and a fine outwardly curved blackish line. The hindwings are whitish with a greyish tinged termen.
