= Hyporatasa =

Scientific classification
- Kingdom: Animalia
- Phylum: Arthropoda
- Clade: Pancrustacea
- Class: Insecta
- Order: Lepidoptera
- Family: Pyralidae
- Tribe: Phycitini
- Genus: Hyporatasa; Rebel, 1901
- Species: H. allotriella

Binomial name
- Hyporatasa allotriella (Herrich-Schäffer, 1855)

Synonyms
- Genus: Hyporatasa Ragonot, 1901; Species: Ratasa allotriella Herrich-Schäffer, 1855

Genus of moths

Hyporatasa is a genus of snout moths. It was described by Hans Rebel in 1901 and contains the species Hyporatasa allotriella described by Gottlieb August Wilhelm Herrich-Schäffer in 1855. It is known from Hungary, Romania, Ukraine and Russia.
