= Oxydisia =

Scientific classification
- Kingdom: Animalia
- Phylum: Arthropoda
- Class: Insecta
- Order: Lepidoptera
- Family: Pyralidae
- Tribe: Phycitini
- Genus: Oxydisia; Hampson, 1901
- Species: O. hyperythrella

Binomial name
- Oxydisia hyperythrella Hampson, 1901

Genus of moths

Oxydisia is a monotypic snout moth genus described by George Hampson in 1901. Its single species, Oxydisia hyperythrella, described by the same author, is known from Australia.
