= Calguia rufobrunnealis =

Scientific classification
- Domain: Eukaryota
- Kingdom: Animalia
- Phylum: Arthropoda
- Class: Insecta
- Order: Lepidoptera
- Family: Pyralidae
- Genus: Calguia
- Species: C. rufobrunnealis

Binomial name
- Calguia rufobrunnealis Yamanaka, 2006

Species of moth

Calguia rufobrunnealis is a species of snout moth in the genus Calguia. It was described by Hiroshi Yamanaka in 2006. It is found in Japan (it was described from Okinawa).

The wingspan is 8–11 millimetres (0.31–0.43 in).

== Bibliography ==
- Yamanaka, H. (2006). "Descriptions of four new species of the subfamily Phycitinae (Pyralidae) from Japan". Tinea. 19 (3): 180–187.
