= Archiephestia =

Scientific classification
- Kingdom: Animalia
- Phylum: Arthropoda
- Class: Insecta
- Order: Lepidoptera
- Family: Pyralidae
- Tribe: Phycitini
- Genus: Archiephestia; Amsel, 1955
- Species: A. adpiscinella

Binomial name
- Archiephestia adpiscinella (Chrétien, 1911)

Synonyms
- Genus: Bignathosia Amsel, 1955; Species: Euzopherodes adpiscinella Chrétien, 1911; Bignathosia adpiscinella; Archiephestia murciella Amsel, 1955

Genus of moths

Archiephestia is a monotypic snout moth genus described by Hans Georg Amsel in 1955. Its single species, Archiephestia adpiscinella, was described by Pierre Chrétien in 1911. It was described from North Africa but is also known from Spain.

The wingspan is 6.5-10.5 mm.
