= Lophothoracia omphalella =

Scientific classification
- Kingdom: Animalia
- Phylum: Arthropoda
- Class: Insecta
- Order: Lepidoptera
- Family: Pyralidae
- Genus: Lophothoracia
- Species: L. omphalella

Binomial name
- Lophothoracia omphalella Hampson, 1901

Species of moth

Lophothoracia omphalella is a species of snout moth in the genus Lophothoracia. It was described by George Hampson in 1901, and it is known from Australia (it was described from Peak Downs and Coomoo in Queensland).
