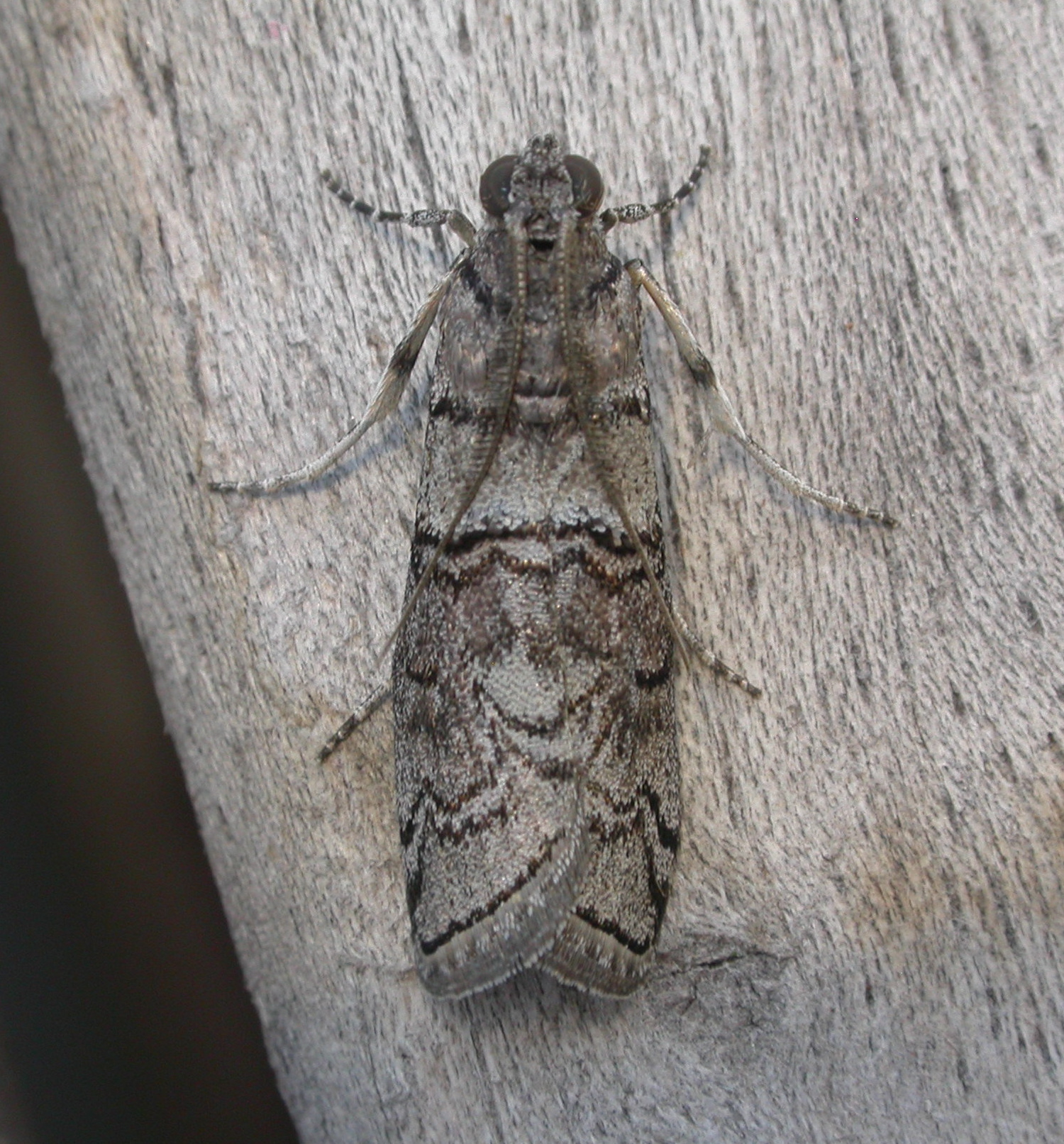

Scientific classification
- Kingdom: Animalia
- Phylum: Arthropoda
- Class: Insecta
- Order: Lepidoptera
- Family: Pyralidae
- Genus: Ctenomeristis
- Species: C. almella

Binomial name
- Ctenomeristis almella (Meyrick, 1879)

Synonyms
- Ceroprepes almella Meyrick, 1879

= Ctenomeristis almella =

Species of moth

Ctenomeristis almella is a species of moth of the family Pyralidae. It is found in Australia.
