= Creobota =

Scientific classification
- Kingdom: Animalia
- Phylum: Arthropoda
- Class: Insecta
- Order: Lepidoptera
- Family: Pyralidae
- Tribe: Phycitini
- Genus: Creobota; Turner, 1931

Genus of moths

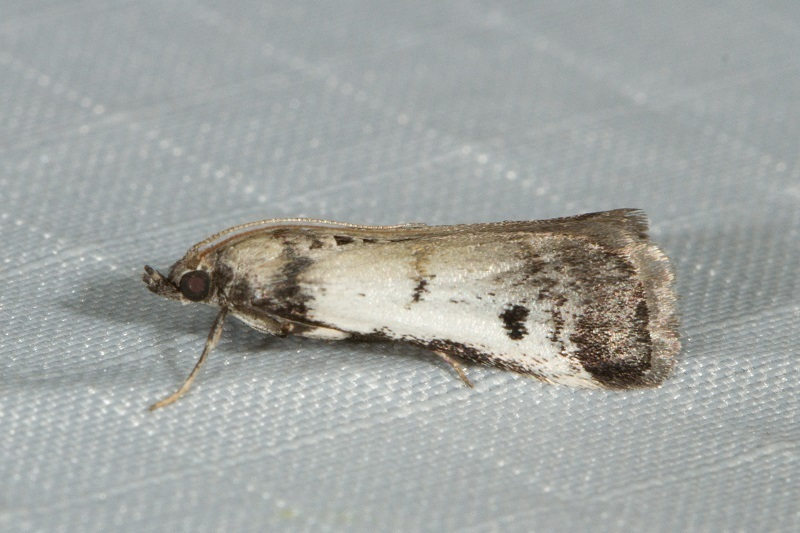
A Creobota grossipunctella moth.

Creobota is a genus of snout moths. It was described by Turner in 1931, and is known from Australia.

== Species ==
- Creobota apodectum
- Creobota grossipunctella (Ragonot, 1888)
