= Lophothoracia =

Scientific classification
- Kingdom: Animalia
- Phylum: Arthropoda
- Class: Insecta
- Order: Lepidoptera
- Family: Pyralidae
- Subfamily: Phycitinae
- Tribe: Phycitini
- Genus: Lophothoracia; Hampson, 1901

Genus of moths

Lophothoracia is a genus of snout moths. It was described by George Hampson in 1901.

== Species ==
- Lophothoracia omphalella Hampson, 1901
- Lophothoracia orthozona (Lower 1903)
