= Ctenomeristis kaltenbachi =

Scientific classification
- Domain: Eukaryota
- Kingdom: Animalia
- Phylum: Arthropoda
- Class: Insecta
- Order: Lepidoptera
- Family: Pyralidae
- Genus: Ctenomeristis
- Species: C. kaltenbachi

Binomial name
- Ctenomeristis kaltenbachi Roesler, 1983

Species of moth

Ctenomeristis kaltenbachi is a species of snout moth in the genus Ctenomeristis. It was described by Rolf-Ulrich Roesler in 1983 and is known from Sumatra, Indonesia.
