= Cryptarthria =

Scientific classification
- Kingdom: Animalia
- Phylum: Arthropoda
- Class: Insecta
- Order: Lepidoptera
- Family: Pyralidae
- Tribe: Phycitini
- Genus: Cryptarthria; Roesler, 1981
- Species: C. pseudolivalis

Binomial name
- Cryptarthria pseudolivalis Roesler, 1981

Genus of moths

Cryptarthria is a genus of snout moths. It was described by Roesler in 1981, and contains the species C. pseudolivalis. It is found in Papua New Guinea.
