= Asclerobia =

Scientific classification
- Domain: Eukaryota
- Kingdom: Animalia
- Phylum: Arthropoda
- Class: Insecta
- Order: Lepidoptera
- Family: Pyralidae
- Subfamily: Phycitinae
- Tribe: Phycitini
- Genus: Asclerobia; Roesler, 1969

Genus of moths

Asclerobia is a genus of snout moths described by Rolf-Ulrich Roesler in 1969 that lives in China and Japan.

== Species ==
- Asclerobia flavitinctella (Ragonot, 1893)
- Asclerobia gilvaria Yamanaka, 2006
- Asclerobia sinensis (Caradja & Meyrick, 1937)
