= Thospia crassipalpella =

Scientific classification
- Domain: Eukaryota
- Kingdom: Animalia
- Phylum: Arthropoda
- Class: Insecta
- Order: Lepidoptera
- Family: Pyralidae
- Genus: Thospia
- Species: T. crassipalpella

Binomial name
- Thospia crassipalpella Ragonot, 1888

Species of moth

Thospia crassipalpella is a species of snout moth in the genus Thospia. It was described by Ragonot in 1888. It is found in Iran.
