= Thospia permixtella =

Scientific classification
- Domain: Eukaryota
- Kingdom: Animalia
- Phylum: Arthropoda
- Class: Insecta
- Order: Lepidoptera
- Family: Pyralidae
- Genus: Thospia
- Species: T. permixtella

Binomial name
- Thospia permixtella Ragonot, 1888

Species of moth

Thospia permixtella is a species of snout moth in the genus Thospia. It was described by Ragonot in 1888. It is found in Russia and Turkmenistan.
