= Cryptomyelois =

Scientific classification
- Kingdom: Animalia
- Phylum: Arthropoda
- Class: Insecta
- Order: Lepidoptera
- Family: Pyralidae
- Tribe: Phycitini
- Genus: Cryptomyelois; Roesler & Küppers, 1979

Genus of moths

Cryptomyelois is a genus of snout moths. It was described by Roesler and Küppers, in 1979, and is known from Sumatra.

== Species ==
- Cryptomyelois glaucobasis
- Cryptomyelois irmhilda Roesler & Küppers, 1979
