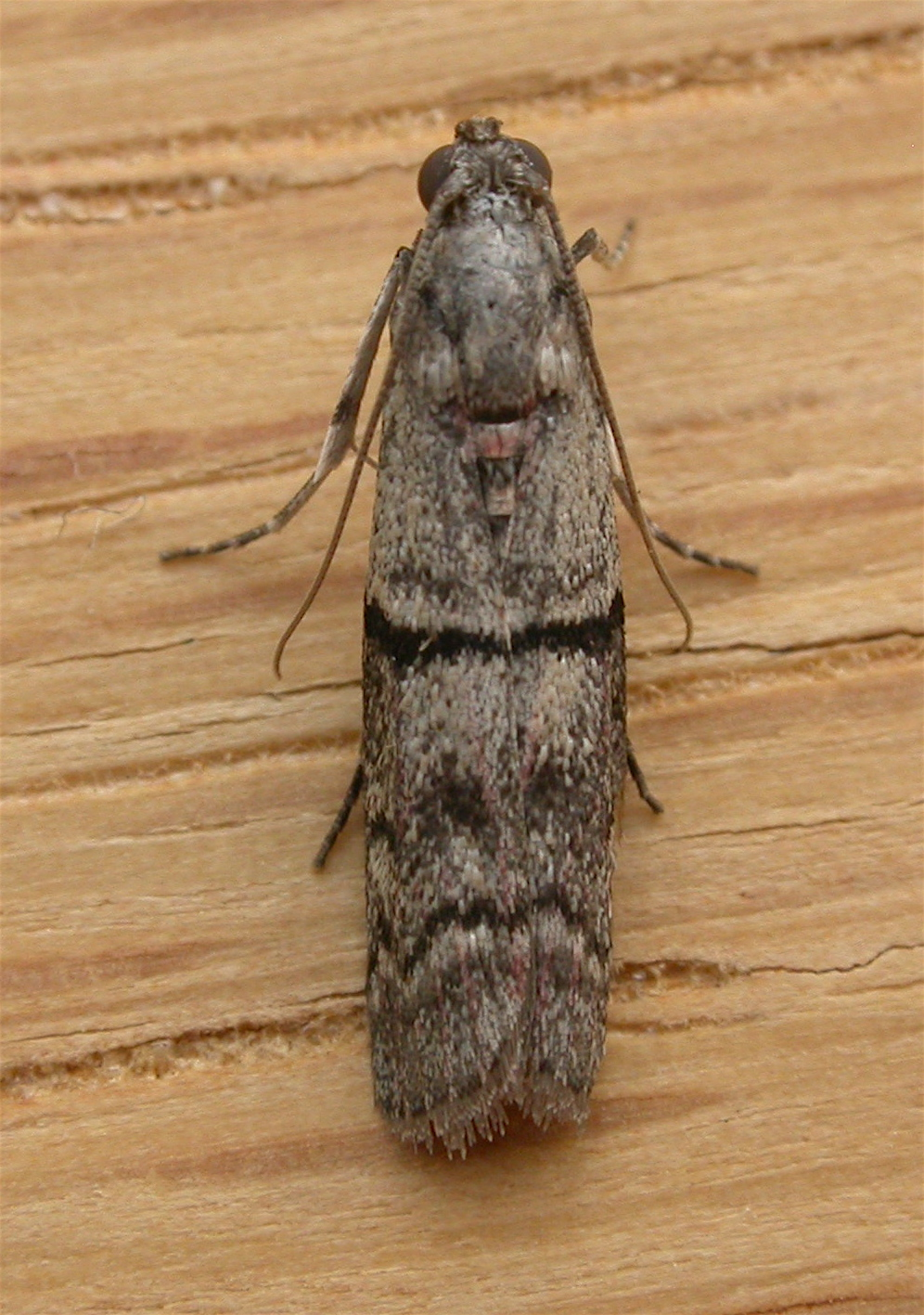
- Imago of Ephestia elutella

Scientific classification
- Kingdom: Animalia
- Phylum: Arthropoda
- Clade: Pancrustacea
- Class: Insecta
- Order: Lepidoptera
- Family: Pyralidae
- Subfamily: Phycitinae
- Tribe: Phycitini; Zeller, 1839

Synonyms
- Acrobasiina Agenjo, 1958

= Phycitini =

Tribe of moths

The Phycitini are a tribe of moths of the family Pyralidae.

== Genera ==
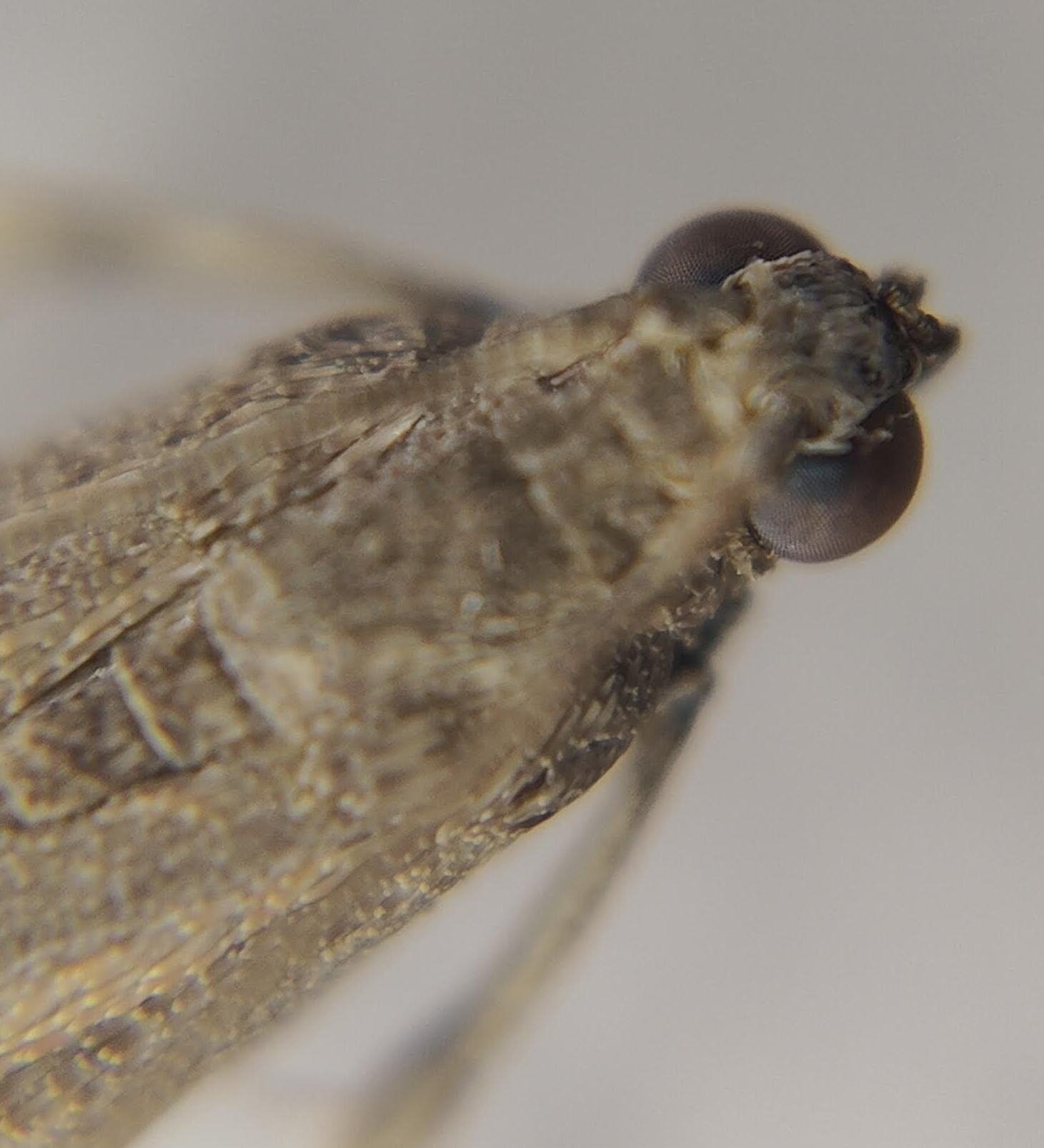
Closeup of head

Some significant species are also listed.

- Abareia Whalley, 1970
- Acrobasis Zeller, 1839
- Addyme Walker, 1863
- Alberada Heinrich, 1939 (sometimes listed as a synonym of Zophodia)
- Alophia Ragonot, 1893
- Ammatucha Turner, 1922
- Amphithrix Ragonot, 1893
- Ancylodes Ragonot, 1887
- Ancylosis Zeller, 1839
- Ancylosoma Roesler, 1973
- Ancylostomia Ragonot, 1893
- Anonaepestis Ragonot, 1894
- Apomyelois Heinrich, 1956
- Archiephestia Amsel, 1955
- Arcola J. C. Shaffer, 1995 – alligatorweed stem borer
- Arsissa Ragonot, 1893
- Asalebria Amsel, 1953
- Asarta Zeller, 1848
- Asartodes Ragonot, 1893
- Asclerobia Roesler, 1969
- Assara Walker, 1863
- Aurana Walker, 1863
- Bahiria Balinsky, 1994
- Barbifrontia Hampson in Ragonot, 1901
- Bazaria Ragonot, 1887
- Bradyrrhoa Zeller, 1848
- Cactoblastis Ragonot, 1901
- Cactobrosis Dyar, 1914 (sometimes listed as a synonym of Zophodia)
- Cadra Walker, 1864
- Calguia Walker, 1863
- Catastia Hübner, 1825
- Cathyalia Ragonot, 1888
- Cavipalpia Ragonot, 1893
- Ceutholopha Zeller, 1867
- Christophia Ragonot, 1887
- Copamyntis Meyrick, 1934
- Cremnophila Ragonot, 1893
- Creobota Turner, 1931
- Crocydopora Meyrick, 1882
- Cryptarthria Roesler, 1981
- Cryptomyelois Roesler & Küppers, 1979
- Ctenomedes Meyrick, 1935
- Ctenomeristis Meyrick, 1929
- Dectocera Ragonot, 1887
- Delplanqueia Leraut, 2001
- Denticera Amsel, 1961
- Dioryctria Zeller, 1846
- Dipha Yoshiyasu, 1988
- Ecbletodes Turner, 1904
- Echinocereta Neunzig, 1997
- Ecnomoneura Turner, 1942
- Ectohomoeosoma Roesler, 1965
- Ectomyelois Heinrich, 1956 (sometimes in Apomyelois)
  - Ectomyelois ceratoniae – locust bean moth
- Elegia Ragonot, 1887
- Encryphodes Turner, 1913
- Ephestia Guenée, 1845
- Ephestiopsis Ragonot, 1893
  - Ephestiopsis oenobarella
- Epicrocis Zeller, 1848
- Epischidia Rebel, 1901
- Epischnia Hübner, 1825
- Episcythrastis Meyrick, 1937
- Eremberga Heinrich, 1939 (sometimes listed as a synonym of Zophodia)
- Eremographa Meyrick, 1932
- Etiella Zeller, 1839
  - Etiella behrii
  - Etiella zinckenella
- Eucampyla Meyrick, 1882
- Eucarphia Hübner, 1825
- Eurhodope Hübner, 1825
  - Eurhodope rosella
- Euzophera Zeller, 1867
- Euzopherodes Hampson, 1899
- Exguiana Neunzig & Solis, 2004
- Faveria Walker, 1859
  - Faveria tritalis
- Glyptoteles Zeller, 1848
- Gymnancyla Zeller, 1848
- Hansreisseria Roesler, 1973
- Heterochrosis Hampson, 1926
- Homoeosoma J. Curtis, 1833
- Hypargyria Ragonot, 1888
- Hypochalcia Hübner, 1825
  - Hypochalcia lignella
- Hyporatasa Rebel, 1901
- Hypsipyla Ragonot, 1888
  - Hypsipyla grandella
- Indomalayia Roesler & Küppers, 1979
- Indomyrlaea Roesler & Küppers, 1979
- Keradere Whalley, 1970
- Khorassania Amsel, 1951
  - Khorassania compositella
- Klimeschiola Roesler, 1965
- Laetilia Ragonot, 1889
- Laodamia Ragonot, 1888
- Lasiosticha Meyrick, 1887
  - Lasiosticha canilinea
  - Lasiosticha opimella
- Lophothoracia Hampson, 1901
- Lymphia Rebel, 1901
- Magiria Zeller, 1867
- Medaniaria Roesler & Küppers, 1979
- Megasis Guenée, 1845
- Melitara Walker, 1863 (sometimes listed as a synonym of Zophodia)
- Merulempista Roesler, 1967
- Mesciniadia Hampson in Ragonot, 1901
- Metallosticha Rebel, 1901
- Metallostichodes Roesler, 1967
- Meyrickiella Hampson in Ragonot, 1901
- Michaeliodes Roesler, 1969
- Moitrelia Leraut, 2001
- Myelois Hübner, 1825
- Myelopsis Heinrich, 1956
- Myrlaea Ragonot, 1887
- Nephopterix Hübner, 1825
  - Nephopterix angustella
- Niethammeriodes Roesler, 1969
- Nonambesa Roesler & Küppers, 1979
- Nyctegretis Zeller, 1848
  - Nyctegretis lineana
- Olycella Walker, 1863(sometimes listed as a synonym of Zophodia)
- Oncocera Stephens, 1829
  - Oncocera semirubella
- Ortholepis Ragonot, 1887
  - Ortholepis betulae
- Oxydisia Hampson, 1901
- Ozamia Hampson in Ragonot, 1901(sometimes listed as a synonym of Zophodia)
- Paramaxillaria Inoue, 1955
- Parramatta Hampson in Ragonot, 1901
- Patagonia Hampson in Ragonot, 1901
- Patagoniodes Roesler, 1969
- Pempelia Hübner, 1825
  - Pempelia brephiella
  - Pempelia formosa
  - Pempelia genistella – gorse colonial hard shoot moth
  - Pempelia heringii – pear fruit borer
  - Pempelia palumbella
- Pempeliella Caradja, 1916
- Phycita J.Curtis, 1828
- Phycitodes Hampson, 1917
  - Phycitodes reliquella
- Pima Hulst, 1888
- Plodia Guenée, 1845– Indianmeal moth
- Polopeustis Ragonot, 1893
- Praeepischnia Amsel, 1954
- Protoetiella Inoue, 1959
- Pseudacrobasis Roesler, 1975
- Pseudoceroprepes Roesler, 1982
- Pseudophycita Roesler, 1969
- Psorosa Zeller, 1846
- Pterothrixidia Amsel, 1954
- Ptyobathra Turner, 1905
- Ptyomaxia Hampson, 1903
- Pyla Grote, 1882
  - Pyla fusca (sometimes separated in Matilella)
- Rambutaneia Roesler & Küppers, 1979
- Ratasa Herrich-Schäffer, 1849
- Salebriopsis Hannemann, 1965
- Sciota Hulst, 1888
  - Sciota adelphella
  - Sciota rhenella
  - Sciota subcaesiella
- Seeboldia Ragonot, 1887
- Selagia Hübner, 1825
- Sempronia Ragonot, 1888
- Stanempista Roesler, 1969
- Stereobela Turner, 1905
- Sudaniola Roesler, 1973
- Symphonistis Turner, 1904
- Synoria Ragonot, 1888
- Syntypica Turner, 1905
- Tephris Ragonot, 1891
- Thospia Ragonot, 1888
- Thylacoptila Meyrick, 1885
- Trachonitis Zeller, 1848
- Trissonca Meyrick, 1882
- Trychnocrana Turner, 1925
- Tucumania (sometimes listed as a synonym of Zophodia)
- Tylochares Meyrick, 1883
- Ulophora Ragonot, 1890
- Unadillides Hampson, 1930
- Unadophanes M. Shaffer, Nielsen & Horak, 1996
- Vietteia Amsel, 1955
- Vinicia Ragonot, 1893
- Vitula Ragonot, 1887
- Volobilis Walker, 1863
- Yosemitia (sometimes listed as a synonym of Zophodia)
- Zonula J.C.Shaffer, 1995 (formerly Hyalospila Ragonot, 1888 nec Herrich-Schäffer, 1853: preoccupied)
- Zophodia Hübner, 1825
  - Zophodia grossulariella
