= Calguia deltophora =

Scientific classification
- Kingdom: Animalia
- Phylum: Arthropoda
- Class: Insecta
- Order: Lepidoptera
- Family: Pyralidae
- Genus: Calguia
- Species: C. deltophora

Binomial name
- Calguia deltophora Lower, 1903

Synonyms
- Phycita deltophora Lower, 1903; Phycita leucomilta Lower, 1903

Species of moth

Calguia deltophora is a species of snout moth in the genus Calguia. It was described by Oswald Bertram Lower in 1903. It is found in Australia.
