= Tephris melanochreella =

Scientific classification
- Domain: Eukaryota
- Kingdom: Animalia
- Phylum: Arthropoda
- Class: Insecta
- Order: Lepidoptera
- Family: Pyralidae
- Genus: Tephris
- Species: T. melanochreella

Binomial name
- Tephris melanochreella (Ragonot, 1887)

Synonyms
- Salebria melanochreella Ragonot, 1887

Species of moth

Tephris melanochreella is a species of moth in the family Pyralidae. It was described by Émile Louis Ragonot in 1887. This moth is found in Turkmenistan.
