= Ptyomaxia syntaractis =

Scientific classification
- Kingdom: Animalia
- Phylum: Arthropoda
- Class: Insecta
- Order: Lepidoptera
- Family: Pyralidae
- Genus: Ptyomaxia
- Species: P. syntaractis

Binomial name
- Ptyomaxia syntaractis (Turner, 1904)

Synonyms
- Nephopteryx syntaractis Turner, 1904; Epicrocis syntaractis; Nephopteryx obenbergeri Strand, 1918

Species of moth

Ptyomaxia syntaractis is a species of moth of the family Pyralidae. It is found in Australia, China and Taiwan.
