= Klimeschiola =

Scientific classification
- Kingdom: Animalia
- Phylum: Arthropoda
- Class: Insecta
- Order: Lepidoptera
- Family: Pyralidae
- Tribe: Phycitini
- Genus: Klimeschiola; Roesler, 1965
- Species: K. philetella

Binomial name
- Klimeschiola philetella (Rebel, 1916)

Synonyms
- Ephestia philetella Rebel, 1916

Genus of moths

Klimeschiola is a genus of snout moths. It was described by Roesler in 1965. It contains only one species, Klimeschiola philetella, which is found in mainland Greece and on Crete.

The wingspan is 16–19 mm.
