= Tephris verruculella =

Scientific classification
- Domain: Eukaryota
- Kingdom: Animalia
- Phylum: Arthropoda
- Class: Insecta
- Order: Lepidoptera
- Family: Pyralidae
- Genus: Tephris
- Species: T. verruculella

Binomial name
- Tephris verruculella (Ragonot, 1887)

Synonyms
- Salebria verruculella Ragonot, 1887; Tephris verruculella rungsi Leraut, 2002

Species of moth

Tephris verruculella is a species of moth in the family Pyralidae. It was described by Ragonot in 1887. It is found in Russia (Transcausia), Morocco and Israel.
