= Dipha =

Scientific classification
- Kingdom: Animalia
- Phylum: Arthropoda
- Class: Insecta
- Order: Lepidoptera
- Family: Pyralidae
- Tribe: Phycitini
- Genus: Dipha; Arakaki & Yoshiyasu, 1988
- Species: D. aphidivora

Binomial name
- Dipha aphidivora (Meyrick, 1934)

Synonyms
- Melitene aphidivora Meyrick, 1934; Acrobasis aphidivora; Isauria aphidivora; Cryptoblabes aphidivora; Conobathra aphidivora; Cryptoblabes aphidivora Yoshiyasu & Ohara, 1982

Genus of moths

Dipha is a monotypic snout moth genus described by N. Arakaki and Yutaka Yoshiyasu in 1988. Its single species, Dipha aphidivora, was described by Edward Meyrick in 1934. It is found in India, China, Malaysia, the Philippines, Taiwan, Java and Japan.
