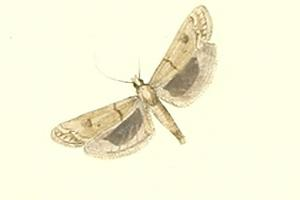
- Male
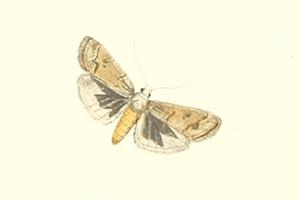
- Female

Scientific classification
- Kingdom: Animalia
- Phylum: Arthropoda
- Clade: Pancrustacea
- Class: Insecta
- Order: Lepidoptera
- Family: Pyralidae
- Genus: Tephris
- Species: T. cyriella

Binomial name
- Tephris cyriella (Erschoff, 1874)

Synonyms
- Pempelia cyriella Erschoff, 1874

= Tephris cyriella =

Species of moth

Tephris cyriella is a species of snout moth in the genus Tephris. It was described by Nikolay Grigoryevich Erschoff in 1874. It is found in Spain, Romania and Turkmenistan.

The wingspan is 20–23 mm.
