= Creobota apodectum =

Scientific classification
- Domain: Eukaryota
- Kingdom: Animalia
- Phylum: Arthropoda
- Class: Insecta
- Order: Lepidoptera
- Family: Pyralidae
- Genus: Creobota
- Species: C. apodectum

Binomial name
- Creobota apodectum (Turner, 1904)

Synonyms
- Hyphantidium apodectum Turner, 1904

Species of moth

Creobota apodectum is a species of snout moth in the genus Creobota. It was described by Alfred Jefferis Turner in 1904 and is found in Australia largely within New South Wales. The moth is usually a speckled dark brown color, with a grey streak along each wing. The wingspan is generally 2 cm in length.
