= Paramaxillaria meretrix =

Scientific classification
- Kingdom: Animalia
- Phylum: Arthropoda
- Class: Insecta
- Order: Lepidoptera
- Family: Pyralidae
- Genus: Paramaxillaria
- Species: P. meretrix

Binomial name
- Paramaxillaria meretrix (Staudinger, 1879)

Synonyms
- Maxillaria meretrix Staudinger, 1879; Pempelia trifracta Turati, 1930

Species of moth

Paramaxillaria meretrix is a species of snout moth. It is found in Turkey and North Africa, including Libya.
