= Thospia tshetverikovi =

Scientific classification
- Domain: Eukaryota
- Kingdom: Animalia
- Phylum: Arthropoda
- Class: Insecta
- Order: Lepidoptera
- Family: Pyralidae
- Genus: Thospia
- Species: T. tshetverikovi

Binomial name
- Thospia tshetverikovi Kuznetzov, 1908

Species of moth

Thospia tshetverikovi is a species of snout moth in the genus Thospia. It was described by V. I. Kuznetzov in 1908. It was described from the Aral Sea in Kazakhstan and Uzbekistan.
