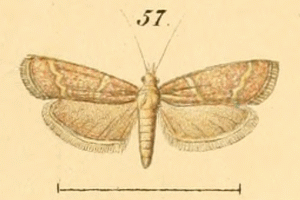

Scientific classification
- Domain: Eukaryota
- Kingdom: Animalia
- Phylum: Arthropoda
- Class: Insecta
- Order: Lepidoptera
- Family: Pyralidae
- Tribe: Phycitini
- Genus: Ancylosoma; Roesler, 1973
- Species: A. substratellum

Binomial name
- Ancylosoma substratellum (Christoph, 1877)

Synonyms
- Myelois substratella Christoph, 1877

= Ancylosoma =

Species of moth

Ancylosoma is a monotypic snout moth genus described by Rolf-Ulrich Roesler in 1973. It contains the single species Ancylosoma substratellum described by Hugo Theodor Christoph in 1877. It was described from Turkmenistan, but is also known from Romania and Russia.

The wingspan is about 10 mm.
