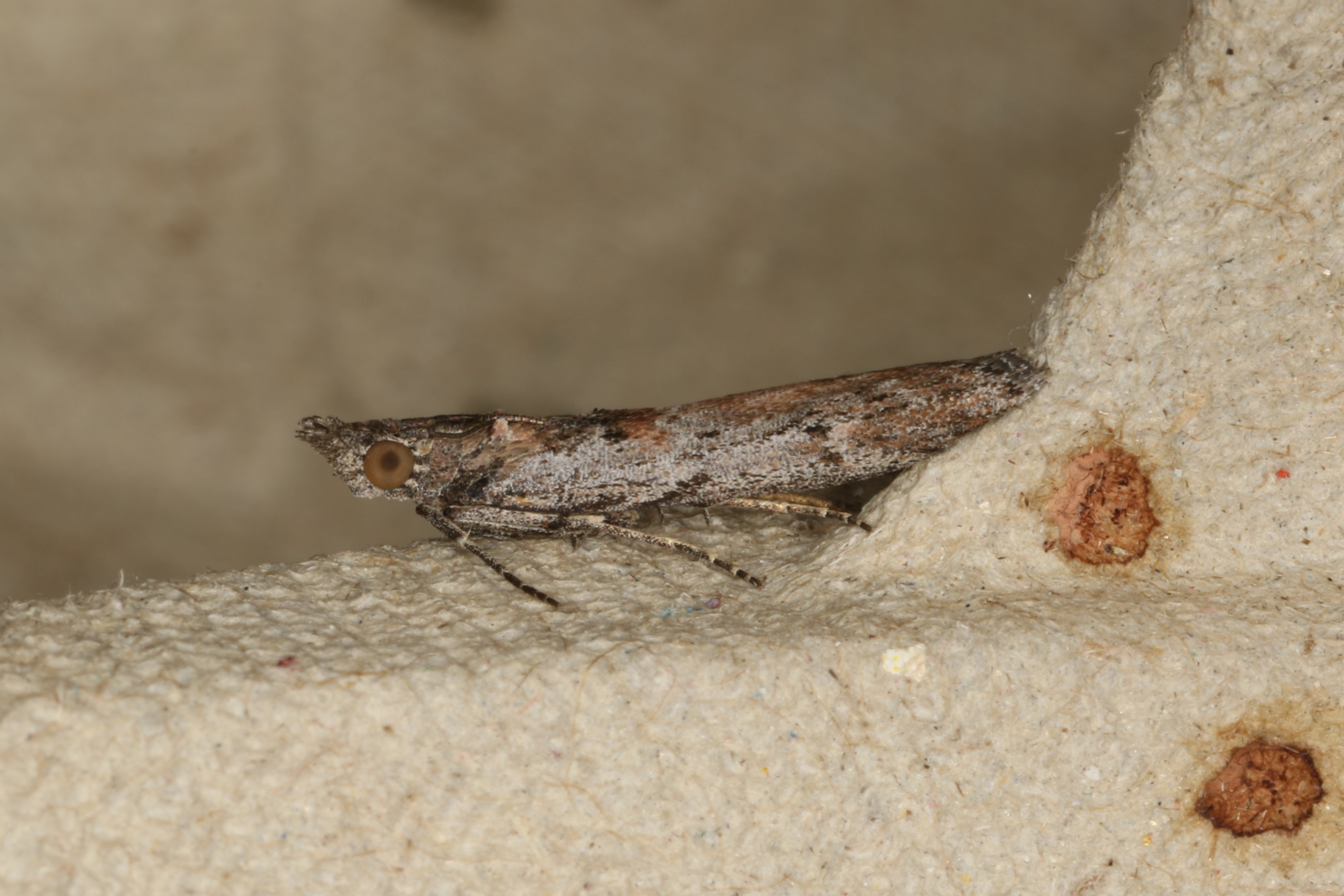
- Crocydopora cinigerella, Aranda, Australian Capital Territory

Scientific classification
- Kingdom: Animalia
- Phylum: Arthropoda
- Clade: Pancrustacea
- Class: Insecta
- Order: Lepidoptera
- Family: Pyralidae
- Tribe: Phycitini
- Genus: Crocydopora; Meyrick, 1882
- Species: C. cinigerella

Binomial name
- Crocydopora cinigerella (Walker, 1866)

Synonyms
- Genus: Crocidopora Hampson, 1908; Crocydophora Whalley, 1970; Species: Nephopteryx cinigerella Walker, 1866; Nephopteryx stenopterella Meyrick, 1879

= Crocydopora =

Genus of moths

Crocydopora is a monotypic snout moth genus described by Edward Meyrick in 1882. Its single species, Crocydopora cinigerella, described by Francis Walker in 1866 is known from Australia and New Zealand.
