= Anonaepestis bengalella =

Scientific classification
- Domain: Eukaryota
- Kingdom: Animalia
- Phylum: Arthropoda
- Class: Insecta
- Order: Lepidoptera
- Family: Pyralidae
- Genus: Anonaepestis
- Species: A. bengalella

Binomial name
- Anonaepestis bengalella Ragonot, 1894

Synonyms
- Heterographis bengalella

Species of moth

Anonaepestis bengalella (atis borer moth or custard-apple caterpillar) is a species of snout moth in the genus Anonaepestis. It was described by Ragonot in 1894. It is found from India to Java and the Philippines and has also been recorded from Australia and Taiwan.

The larvae feed on Annona squamosa and Annona reticulata. They bore the fruit of their host plant.
