= Abareia =

Scientific classification
- Kingdom: Animalia
- Phylum: Arthropoda
- Clade: Pancrustacea
- Class: Insecta
- Order: Lepidoptera
- Family: Pyralidae
- Subfamily: Phycitinae
- Tribe: Phycitini
- Genus: Abareia; Whalley, 1970
- Species: A. amaurodes

Binomial name
- Abareia amaurodes (Turner, 1947)

Synonyms
- Genus: Abarys Turner, 1947; Species: Abarys amaurodes Turner, 1947

Genus of moths

Abareia is a monotypic moth genus belonging to the family Pyralidae. It was described by Paul E. S. Whalley in 1970. It contains only one species, Abareia amaurodes, described by Alfred Jefferis Turner in 1947, which is found in Australia.
