= Indomyrlaea =

Scientific classification
- Kingdom: Animalia
- Phylum: Arthropoda
- Class: Insecta
- Order: Lepidoptera
- Family: Pyralidae
- Tribe: Phycitini
- Genus: Indomyrlaea; Roesler & Küppers, 1979
- Species: I. auchmodes

Binomial name
- Indomyrlaea auchmodes (Turner, 1905)

Synonyms
- Phycita auchmodes Turner, 1905; Tylochares anaxia Turner, 1947

Genus of moths

Indomyrlaea is a genus of snout moths described by Rolf-Ulrich Roesler and Peter Victor Küppers in 1979. It contains the species Indomyrlaea auchmodes described by Alfred Jefferis Turner in 1905. It is known from Australia.
