= Eucampyla =

Scientific classification
- Domain: Eukaryota
- Kingdom: Animalia
- Phylum: Arthropoda
- Class: Insecta
- Order: Lepidoptera
- Family: Pyralidae
- Tribe: Phycitini
- Genus: Eucampyla; Meyrick, 1882
- Species: E. etheiella

Binomial name
- Eucampyla etheiella Meyrick, 1882

Synonyms
- Homoeosoma inexplorata Meyrick, 1929

Genus of moths

Eucampyla is a monotypic snout moth genus. Its only species, Eucampyla etheiella, is known from Micronesia, the Society Islands and Australia. Both the genus and species were first described by Edward Meyrick in 1882.

The larvae feed on Chromolaena odorata. They attack both young flower buds and mature leaves.
