= Thospia trifasciella =

Scientific classification
- Domain: Eukaryota
- Kingdom: Animalia
- Phylum: Arthropoda
- Class: Insecta
- Order: Lepidoptera
- Family: Pyralidae
- Genus: Thospia
- Species: T. trifasciella

Binomial name
- Thospia trifasciella (Ragonot, 1887)

Synonyms
- Heterographis trifasciella Ragonot, 1887; Thospia alborivulella Ragonot, 1888

Species of moth

Thospia trifasciella is a species of snout moth in the genus Thospia. It was described by Ragonot in 1887. It is found in China and Uzbekistan.
