= Dectocera =

Scientific classification
- Kingdom: Animalia
- Phylum: Arthropoda
- Class: Insecta
- Order: Lepidoptera
- Family: Pyralidae
- Tribe: Phycitini
- Genus: Dectocera; Ragonot, 1887
- Species: D. pseudolimbella

Binomial name
- Dectocera pseudolimbella Ragonot, 1887

Genus of moths

Dectocera is a genus of snout moths. It was described by Ragonot in 1887, and contains the species D. pseudolimbella. It is found in Croatia.

The wingspan is about 17 mm.
