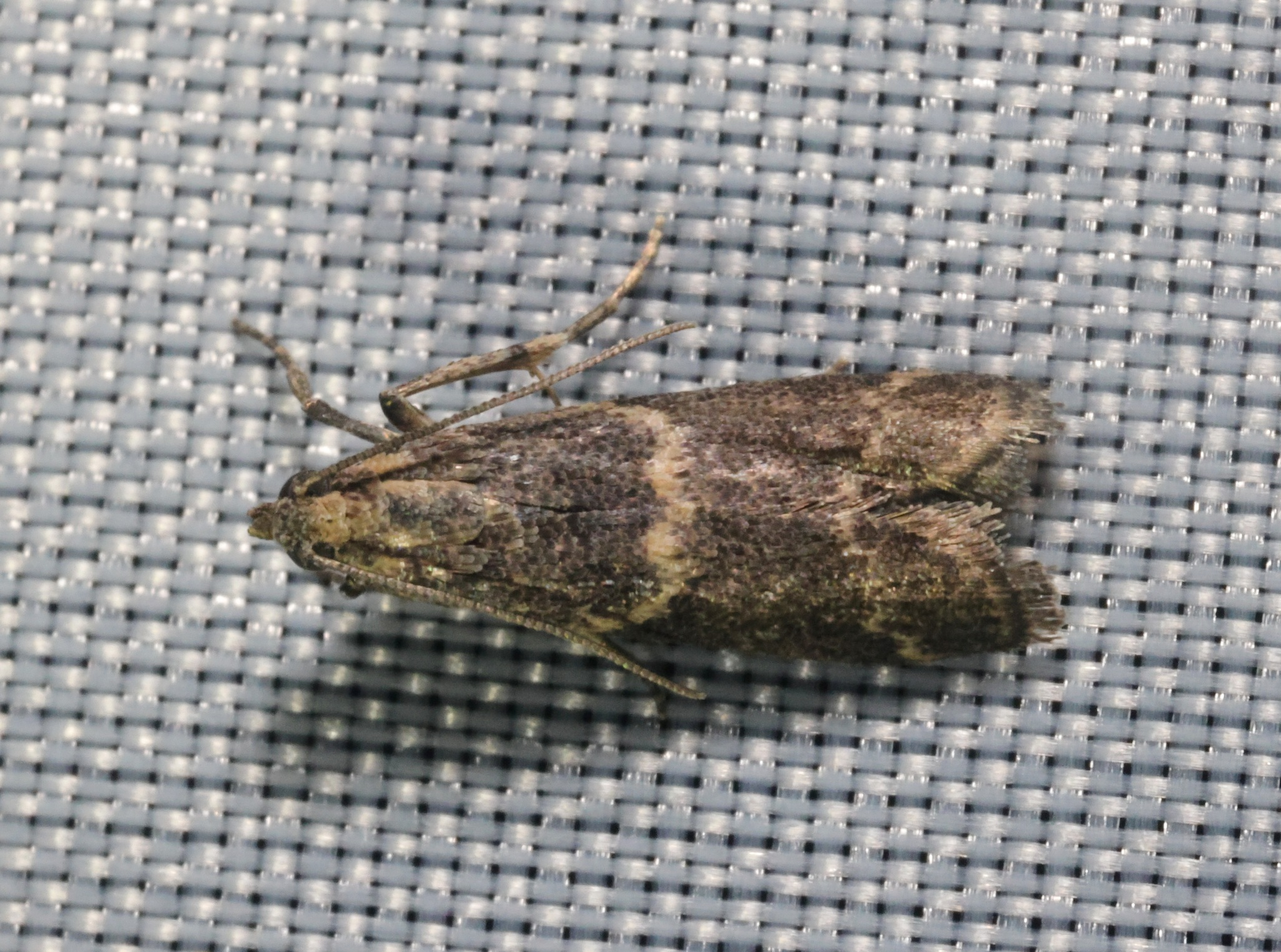
- Mesciniadia infractalis, China

Scientific classification
- Domain: Eukaryota
- Kingdom: Animalia
- Phylum: Arthropoda
- Class: Insecta
- Order: Lepidoptera
- Family: Pyralidae
- Subfamily: Phycitinae
- Tribe: Phycitini
- Genus: Mesciniadia; Hampson in Ragonot, 1901

Synonyms
- Meseiniadia Turner, 1913

= Mesciniadia =

Genus of moths

Mesciniadia is a genus of pyralid moths in the family Pyralidae. There are at least three described species in Mesciniadia, found in Southeast Asia, China, and Australia.

== Species ==
These three species belong to the genus Mesciniadia:

- Mesciniadia aenicta (Turner, 1913)
- Mesciniadia infractalis Walker, 1864
- Mesciniadia otoptila (Turner, 1913)
