= Cavipalpia argentilavella =

Scientific classification
- Kingdom: Animalia
- Phylum: Arthropoda
- Class: Insecta
- Order: Lepidoptera
- Family: Pyralidae
- Genus: Cavipalpia
- Species: C. argentilavella

Binomial name
- Cavipalpia argentilavella (Hampson, 1901)

Synonyms
- Laodamia argentilavella Hampson, 1901; Phycita hemicallista Lower, 1902

Species of moth

Cavipalpia argentilavella is a species of snout moth in the genus Cavipalpia. It is found in Australia.
