= Cathyalia okinawana =

Scientific classification
- Kingdom: Animalia
- Phylum: Arthropoda
- Class: Insecta
- Order: Lepidoptera
- Family: Pyralidae
- Genus: Cathyalia
- Species: C. okinawana

Binomial name
- Cathyalia okinawana Yamanaka, 2003

Species of moth

Cathyalia okinawana is a species of snout moth in the genus Cathyalia. It was described by Hiroshi Yamanaka in 2003 and is known from Japan.
