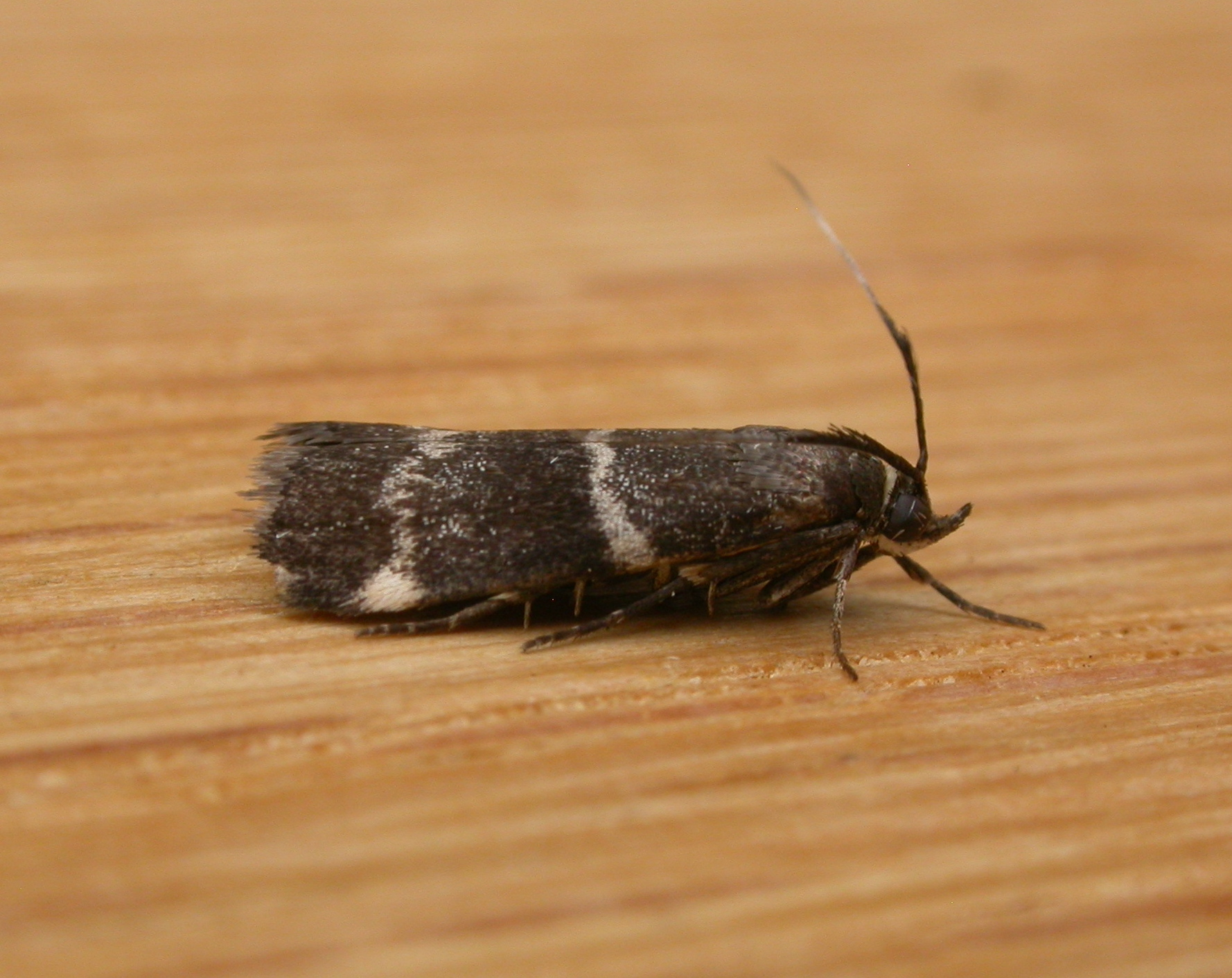
- Lasiosticha canilinea

Scientific classification
- Kingdom: Animalia
- Phylum: Arthropoda
- Class: Insecta
- Order: Lepidoptera
- Family: Pyralidae
- Subfamily: Phycitinae
- Tribe: Phycitini
- Genus: Lasiosticha; Meyrick, 1887

Synonyms
- Lasiocera Meyrick, 1879

= Lasiosticha =

Genus of moths

Lasiosticha is a genus of snout moths. It was described by Edward Meyrick in 1887.

== Species ==
- Lasiosticha antelia (Meyrick, 1885)
- Lasiosticha canilinea (Meyrick, 1879)
- Lasiosticha microcosma Lower, 1893
- Lasiosticha opimella (Meyrick, 1879)
- Lasiosticha thermochroa (Lower, 1896)
