= Ctenomedes =

Scientific classification
- Kingdom: Animalia
- Phylum: Arthropoda
- Clade: Pancrustacea
- Class: Insecta
- Order: Lepidoptera
- Family: Pyralidae
- Tribe: Phycitini
- Genus: Ctenomedes; Meyrick, 1935
- Species: C. neuractis

Binomial name
- Ctenomedes neuractis Meyrick, 1935

Genus of moths

Ctenomedes is a monotypic snout moth genus. Its only species, Ctenomedes neuractis, is found in India. Both the genus and species were first described by Edward Meyrick in 1935.
