= Cryptomyelois irmhilda =

Scientific classification
- Kingdom: Animalia
- Phylum: Arthropoda
- Class: Insecta
- Order: Lepidoptera
- Family: Pyralidae
- Genus: Cryptomyelois
- Species: C. irmhilda

Binomial name
- Cryptomyelois irmhilda Roesler & Küppers, 1979

Species of moth

Cryptomyelois irmhilda is a species of snout moth in the genus Cryptomyelois. It was described by Roesler and Küppers, in 1979, and is known from northern Sumatra.
