= Pseudophycita =

Scientific classification
- Kingdom: Animalia
- Phylum: Arthropoda
- Clade: Pancrustacea
- Class: Insecta
- Order: Lepidoptera
- Family: Pyralidae
- Tribe: Phycitini
- Genus: Pseudophycita; Roesler, 1969
- Species: P. deformella

Binomial name
- Pseudophycita deformella (Moschler, 1866)

Synonyms
- Pempelia deformella Moschler, 1866

Genus of moths

Pseudophycita is a genus of snout moths. It was described by Roesler in 1969. It contains only one species, Pseudophycita deformella, which is found in Ukraine and Russia.

The wingspan is about 23–25 mm.
