= Ammatucha brevilepigera =

Scientific classification
- Kingdom: Animalia
- Phylum: Arthropoda
- Class: Insecta
- Order: Lepidoptera
- Family: Pyralidae
- Genus: Ammatucha
- Species: A. brevilepigera

Binomial name
- Ammatucha brevilepigera Ren & Li, 2006

Species of moth

Ammatucha brevilepigera is a species of snout moth in the genus Ammatucha. It was described by Ren & Li, in 2006, and is known from China.
