= Medaniaria =

Scientific classification
- Kingdom: Animalia
- Phylum: Arthropoda
- Class: Insecta
- Order: Lepidoptera
- Family: Pyralidae
- Tribe: Phycitini
- Genus: Medaniaria; Roesler & Küppers, 1979
- Species: M. adiacritis

Binomial name
- Medaniaria adiacritis (Turner, 1904)

Synonyms
- Phycita adiacritis Turner, 1904

Genus of moths

Medaniaria is a monotypic snout moth genus described by Rolf-Ulrich Roesler and Peter Victor Küppers in 1979. Its one species, Medaniaria adiacritis, described by Alfred Jefferis Turner in 1904, is known from Australia, including Queensland.
