= Magiria =

Scientific classification
- Kingdom: Animalia
- Phylum: Arthropoda
- Clade: Pancrustacea
- Class: Insecta
- Order: Lepidoptera
- Family: Pyralidae
- Tribe: Phycitini
- Genus: Magiria; Zeller, 1867
- Species: M. imparella

Binomial name
- Magiria imparella Zeller, 1867

Synonyms
- Epicrocis seminigra Lucas, 1892

Genus of moths

Magiria is a monotypic snout moth genus described by Philipp Christoph Zeller in 1867. Its only species, Magiria imparella, described by the same author, is found in Australia.
