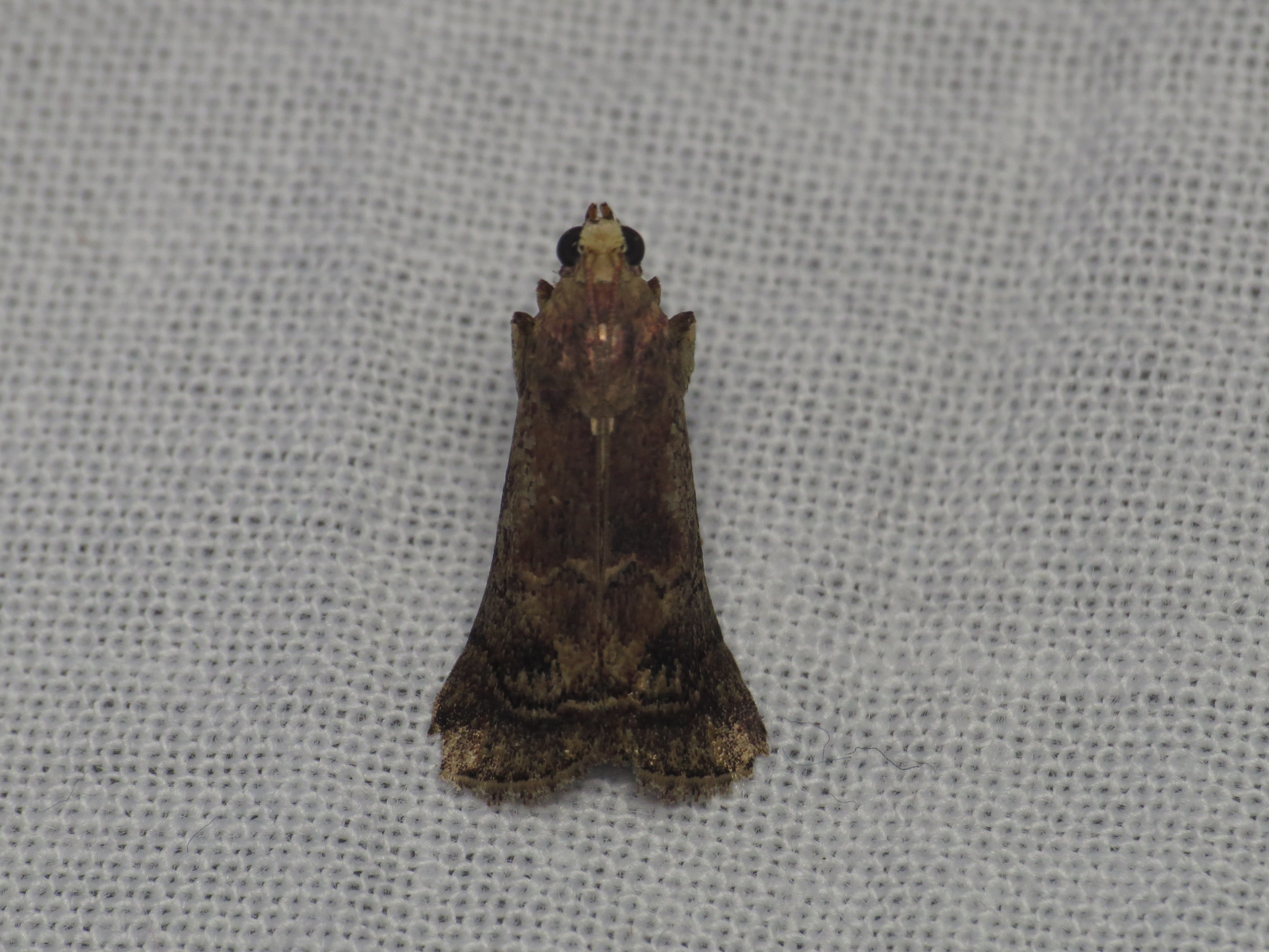

Scientific classification
- Domain: Eukaryota
- Kingdom: Animalia
- Phylum: Arthropoda
- Class: Insecta
- Order: Lepidoptera
- Family: Pyralidae
- Genus: Cathyalia
- Species: C. fulvella

Binomial name
- Cathyalia fulvella Ragonot, 1888

Synonyms
- Spatulipalpia erythrina Hampson, 1896; Cryptoblabes rufimarginella Pagenstecher, 1900; Trissonca clytopa Turner, 1947

= Cathyalia fulvella =

Species of moth

Cathyalia fulvella is a species of snout moth in the genus Cathyalia. It was described by Émile Louis Ragonot in 1888. It is found in Australia.

The larvae have been recorded feeding on mango.
