= Stanempista =

Scientific classification
- Domain: Eukaryota
- Kingdom: Animalia
- Phylum: Arthropoda
- Class: Insecta
- Order: Lepidoptera
- Family: Pyralidae
- Tribe: Phycitini
- Genus: Stanempista; Roesler, 1969
- Species: S. schawerdae

Binomial name
- Stanempista schawerdae (Zerny, 1927)

Synonyms
- Staudingeria schawerdae Zerny, 1927

Species of moth

Stanempista is a genus of snout moths. It was described by Roesler in 1969. It contains only one species Stanempista schawerdae, which is found in Spain.
