= Ectohomoeosoma =

Scientific classification
- Kingdom: Animalia
- Phylum: Arthropoda
- Class: Insecta
- Order: Lepidoptera
- Family: Pyralidae
- Tribe: Phycitini
- Genus: Ectohomoeosoma; Roesler, 1965
- Species: E. kasyellum

Binomial name
- Ectohomoeosoma kasyellum Roesler, 1965

Genus of moths

Ectohomoeosoma is a genus of snout moths. It was described by Roesler in 1965, and is known from Hungary. It contains the species E. kasyellum. It is found in Austria, Slovakia, Hungary and Romania.
