= Ecbletodes =

Scientific classification
- Kingdom: Animalia
- Phylum: Arthropoda
- Class: Insecta
- Order: Lepidoptera
- Family: Pyralidae
- Tribe: Phycitini
- Genus: Ecbletodes; Turner, 1904
- Species: E. psephenias

Binomial name
- Ecbletodes psephenias Turner, 1904

Synonyms
- Euzophera arrhythmopis Turner, 1947

Genus of moths

Ecbletodes is a genus of snout moths. It was described by Alfred Jefferis Turner in 1904, and contains a single species, E. psephenias. It is found in Australia.
