= Cavipalpia =

Scientific classification
- Kingdom: Animalia
- Phylum: Arthropoda
- Class: Insecta
- Order: Lepidoptera
- Family: Pyralidae
- Tribe: Phycitini
- Genus: Cavipalpia; Ragonot, 1893

Genus of moths

Cavipalpia is a genus of snout moths. It was described by Ragonot, in 1893.

== Species ==
- Cavipalpia argentilavella
- Cavipalpia translucidella Ragonot, 1893
