= Ammatucha porisada =

Scientific classification
- Domain: Eukaryota
- Kingdom: Animalia
- Phylum: Arthropoda
- Class: Insecta
- Order: Lepidoptera
- Family: Pyralidae
- Genus: Ammatucha
- Species: A. porisada

Binomial name
- Ammatucha porisada (Roesler & Küppers, 1979)

Synonyms
- Sumatraphycis porisada Roesler & Küppers, 1979

Species of moth

Ammatucha porisada is a species of snout moth in the genus Ammatucha. It was described by Roesler and Küppers, in 1979, and is known from Sumatra.
