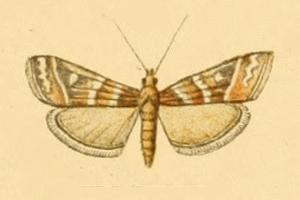

Scientific classification
- Domain: Eukaryota
- Kingdom: Animalia
- Phylum: Arthropoda
- Class: Insecta
- Order: Lepidoptera
- Family: Pyralidae
- Tribe: Phycitini
- Genus: Vietteia; Amsel, 1955
- Species: V. terstrigella

Binomial name
- Vietteia terstrigella (Christoph, 1877)

Synonyms
- Myelois terstrigella Christoph, 1877

= Vietteia =

Genus of moths

Vietteia is a monotypic snout moth genus described by Hans Georg Amsel in 1955. Its only species, Vietteia terstrigella, described by Hugo Theodor Christoph, is found in Russia, Kazakhstan, Turkmenistan and Mongolia.
