= Ctenomeristis albata =

Scientific classification
- Domain: Eukaryota
- Kingdom: Animalia
- Phylum: Arthropoda
- Class: Insecta
- Order: Lepidoptera
- Family: Pyralidae
- Genus: Ctenomeristis
- Species: C. albata

Binomial name
- Ctenomeristis albata Horak, 1998

Species of moth

Ctenomeristis albata is a species of snout moth in the genus Ctenomeristis. It was described by Marianne Horak in 1998, and is known from Papua New Guinea and Queensland, Australia.
