= Ammatucha semiirrorella =

Scientific classification
- Kingdom: Animalia
- Phylum: Arthropoda
- Class: Insecta
- Order: Lepidoptera
- Family: Pyralidae
- Genus: Ammatucha
- Species: A. semiirrorella

Binomial name
- Ammatucha semiirrorella (Hampson, 1896)

Synonyms
- Nephopteryx semiirrorella Hampson, 1896; Ammatucha lathria Turner, 1922

Species of moth

Ammatucha semiirrorella is a species of snout moth in the genus Ammatucha. It was described by George Hampson in 1896 and is known from south-east Asia (including Bhutan and Nagas), as well as Australia.
