= Cavipalpia translucidella =

Scientific classification
- Domain: Eukaryota
- Kingdom: Animalia
- Phylum: Arthropoda
- Class: Insecta
- Order: Lepidoptera
- Family: Pyralidae
- Genus: Cavipalpia
- Species: C. translucidella

Binomial name
- Cavipalpia translucidella Ragonot, 1893

Species of moth

Cavipalpia translucidella is a species of snout moth in the genus Cavipalpia. It was described by Ragonot, in 1893. It is found in India.
