= Cathyalia pallicostalis =

Scientific classification
- Kingdom: Animalia
- Phylum: Arthropoda
- Clade: Pancrustacea
- Class: Insecta
- Order: Lepidoptera
- Family: Pyralidae
- Genus: Cathyalia
- Species: C. pallicostalis

Binomial name
- Cathyalia pallicostalis (Walker, 1863)

Synonyms
- Nephopteryx pallicostalis Walker, 1863; Spatulipalpia pallicostalis (Walker, 1863)

Species of moth

Cathyalia pallicostalis is a species of snout moth. It was first described by Francis Walker in 1863 and is found in Australia.
