= Asclerobia flavitinctella =

Scientific classification
- Kingdom: Animalia
- Phylum: Arthropoda
- Class: Insecta
- Order: Lepidoptera
- Family: Pyralidae
- Genus: Asclerobia
- Species: A. flavitinctella

Binomial name
- Asclerobia flavitinctella (Ragonot, 1893)

Synonyms
- Laodamia flavitinctella Ragonot, 1893

Species of moth

Asclerobia is a species of snout moth in the genus Asclerobia. It was described by Émile Louis Ragonot in 1893, and is known from Australia.
