= Asclerobia gilvaria =

Scientific classification
- Domain: Eukaryota
- Kingdom: Animalia
- Phylum: Arthropoda
- Class: Insecta
- Order: Lepidoptera
- Family: Pyralidae
- Genus: Asclerobia
- Species: A. gilvaria

Binomial name
- Asclerobia gilvaria Yamanaka, 2006

Species of moth

Asclerobia gilvaria is a species of snout moth in the genus Asclerobia. It was described by Hiroshi Yamanaka in 2006, and is known from Japan.
