= Exguiana =

Scientific classification
- Kingdom: Animalia
- Phylum: Arthropoda
- Clade: Pancrustacea
- Class: Insecta
- Order: Lepidoptera
- Family: Pyralidae
- Tribe: Phycitini
- Genus: Exguiana; Neunzig & Solis, 2004

Genus of moths

Exguiana is a genus of snout moths in the subfamily Phycitinae. It was described by Herbert H. Neunzig and Maria Alma Solis in 2004 and is known from South America.

== Species ==
- Exguiana beckeri Neunzig & Solis, 2004
- Exguiana limonensis Neunzig & Solis, 2004
- Exguiana pitillana Neunzig & Solis, 2004
- Exguiana postflavida (Dyar, 1923)
