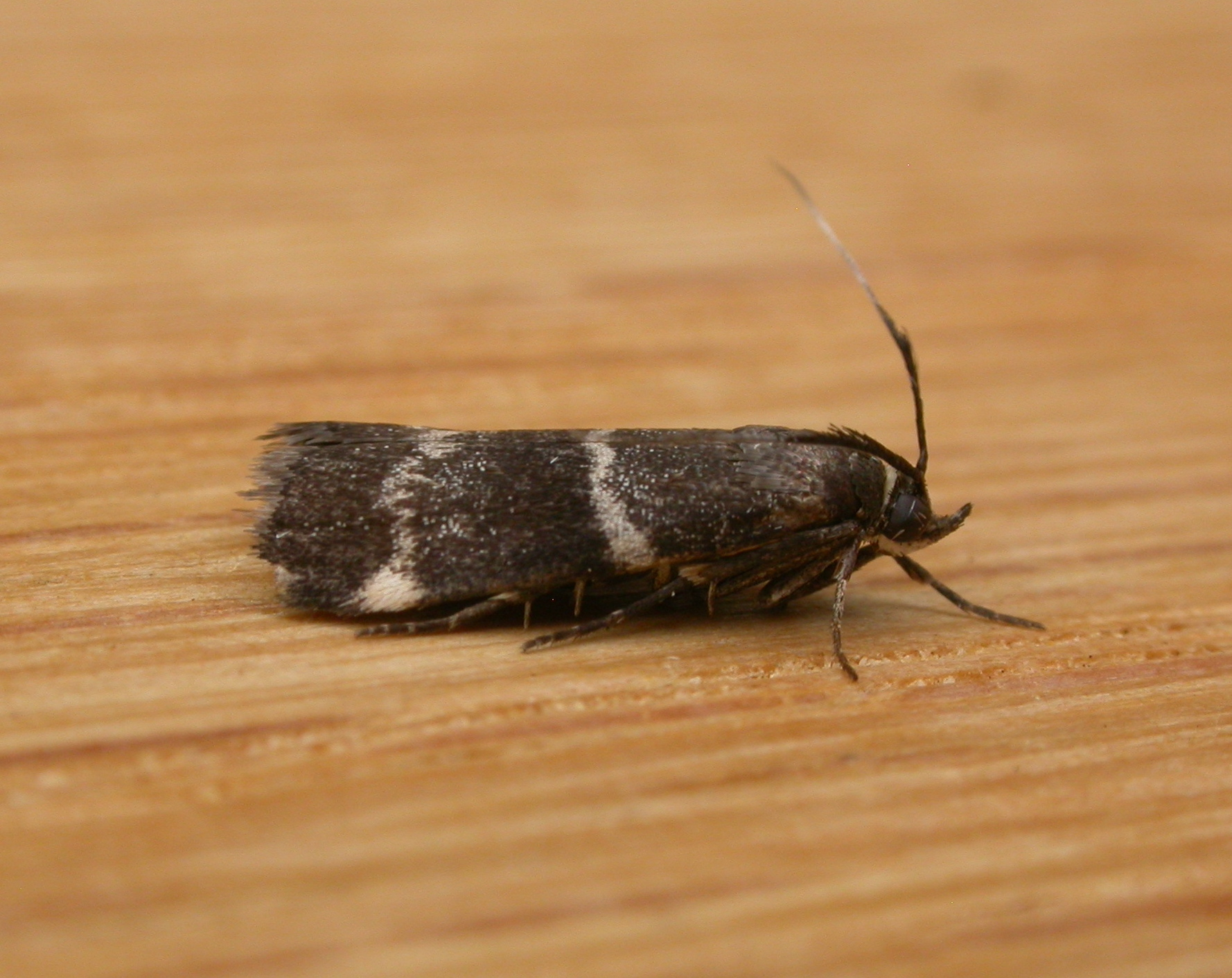

Scientific classification
- Kingdom: Animalia
- Phylum: Arthropoda
- Class: Insecta
- Order: Lepidoptera
- Family: Pyralidae
- Genus: Lasiosticha
- Species: L. canilinea

Binomial name
- Lasiosticha canilinea (Meyrick, 1879)

Synonyms
- Lasiocera canilinea Meyrick, 1879

= Lasiosticha canilinea =

Species of moth

Lasiosticha canilinea is a species of moth of the family Pyralidae. It is found in Australia.
