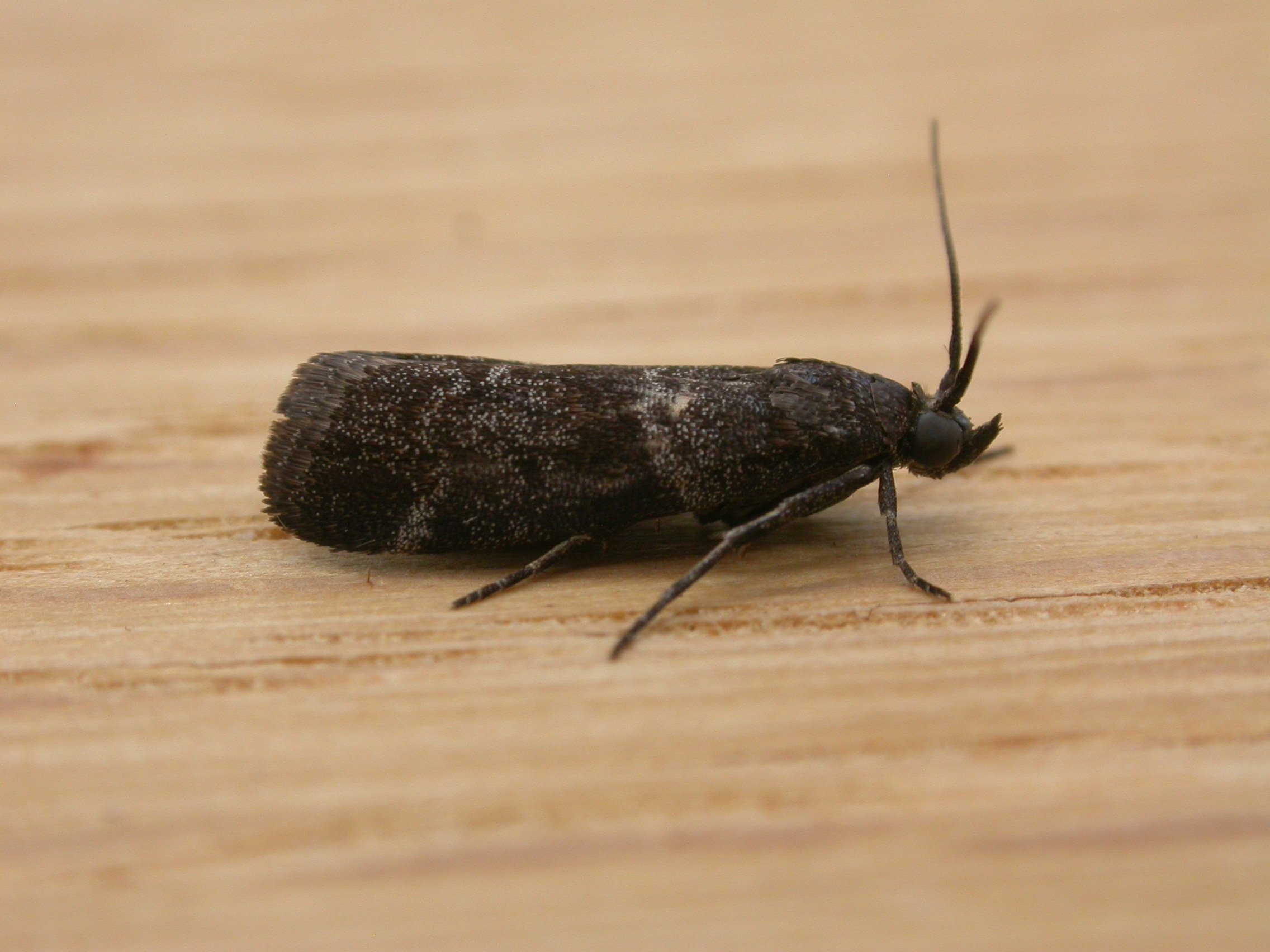

Scientific classification
- Kingdom: Animalia
- Phylum: Arthropoda
- Class: Insecta
- Order: Lepidoptera
- Family: Pyralidae
- Genus: Lasiosticha
- Species: L. opimella

Binomial name
- Lasiosticha opimella (Meyrick, 1879)

Synonyms
- Nephopteryx opimella Meyrick, 1879

= Lasiosticha opimella =

Species of moth

Lasiosticha opimella is a species of moth of the family Pyralidae. It is found in Australia.
