= Eremographa =

Scientific classification
- Kingdom: Animalia
- Phylum: Arthropoda
- Class: Insecta
- Order: Lepidoptera
- Family: Pyralidae
- Tribe: Phycitini
- Genus: Eremographa; Meyrick, 1932
- Species: E. sebasmia

Binomial name
- Eremographa sebasmia (Meyrick, 1887)

Synonyms
- Ceroprepes sebasmia Meyrick, 1887

Genus of moths

Eremographa is a monotypic snout moth genus described by Edward Meyrick in 1932. It contains the single species Eremographa sebasmia described by the same author in 1887. It is found in Australia.
