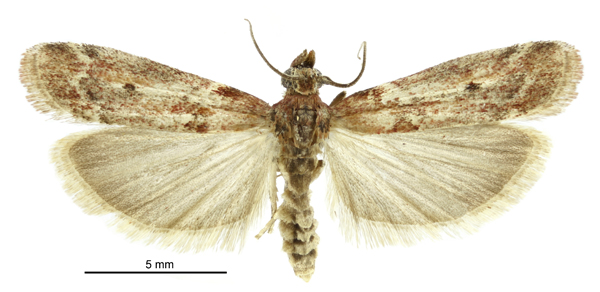
- A male of an undescribed Vinicia species

Scientific classification
- Domain: Eukaryota
- Kingdom: Animalia
- Phylum: Arthropoda
- Class: Insecta
- Order: Lepidoptera
- Family: Pyralidae
- Genus: Vinicia; Ragonot, 1893

= Vinicia (moth) =

Genus of insects

Vinicia is a genus of moths belonging to the family Pyralidae.

The species of this genus are found in Australia and New Zealand.

Species:

- Vinicia eucometis Meyrick, 1882
- Vinicia guttella Snellen, 1882
