= List of moths of the Iberian Peninsula (P–Z) =

Location of the Iberian Peninsula

Iberian moths represent about 4,454 different types of moths. The moths (mostly nocturnal) and butterflies (mostly diurnal) together make up the taxonomic order Lepidoptera.

This is a list of moth species which have been recorded in Portugal, Spain and Gibraltar (together forming the Iberian Peninsula). This list also includes species found on the Balearic Islands.

== Peleopodidae ==
- Carcina quercana (Fabricius, 1775)
- Odites kollarella (O. Costa, 1832)
- Odites ternatella (Staudinger, 1859)

== Plutellidae ==
- Eidophasia syenitella Herrich-Schäffer, 1854
- Plutella xylostella (Linnaeus, 1758)
- Plutella porrectella (Linnaeus, 1758)
- Rhigognostis annulatella (Curtis, 1832)
- Rhigognostis hufnagelii (Zeller, 1839)
- Rhigognostis incarnatella (Steudel, 1873)

== Praydidae ==
- Distagmos ledereri Herrich-Schäffer, 1854
- Prays citri (Milliere, 1873)
- Prays fraxinella (Bjerkander, 1784)
- Prays oleae (Bernard, 1788)
- Prays peregrina (Agassiz, 2007)

== Prodoxidae ==
- Lampronia fuscatella (Tengstrom, 1848)
- Lampronia morosa Zeller, 1852
- Lampronia pubicornis (Haworth, 1828)

== Psychidae ==
- Acanthopsyche atra (Linnaeus, 1767)
- Apterona crenulella (Bruand, 1853)
- Apterona gracilis (Ad. Speyer, 1886)
- Apterona helicoidella (Vallot, 1827)
- Apterona nylanderi (Wehrli, 1927)
- Bankesia conspurcatella (Zeller, 1850)
- Bijugis bombycella (Denis & Schiffermuller, 1775)
- Bijugis pectinella (Denis & Schiffermuller, 1775)
- Brevantennia pinkeri Sieder, 1964
- Canephora hirsuta (Poda, 1761)
- Dahlica larella (Chretien, 1906)
- Dahlica rianella Hattenschwiler, 1981
- Dahlica triquetrella (Hübner, 1813)
- Diplodoma laichartingella Goeze, 1783
- Dissoctena albidella Rebel, 1902
- Dissoctena granigerella Staudinger, 1859
- Eotaleporia lusitaniella Amsel, 1955
- Epichnopterix plumella (Denis & Schiffermuller, 1775)
- Epichnopterix sieboldi (Reutti, 1853)
- Eumasia brunella Hattenschwiler, 1996
- Eumasia parietariella (Heydenreich, 1851)
- Luffia lapidella (Goeze, 1783)
- Narycia astrella (Herrich-Schäffer, 1851)
- Narycia duplicella (Goeze, 1783)
- Oiketicoides eganai (Agenjo, 1962)
- Oiketicoides febretta (Boyer de Fonscolombe, 1835)
- Oiketicoides tedaldii (Heylaerts, 1881)
- Oreopsyche tenella (Ad. Speyer, 1862)
- Pachythelia villosella (Ochsenheimer, 1810)
- Penestoglossa dardoinella (Milliere, 1863)
- Penestoglossa pyrenaella Herrmann, 2006
- Phalacropterix calberlae (Heylaerts, 1890)
- Phalacropterix fritschi Hattenschwiler, 2003
- Phalacropterix graminifera (Fourcroy, 1785)
- Phalacropterix praecellens (Staudinger, 1870)
- Placodoma ragonoti (Rebel, 1901)
- Pseudobankesia casaella Hattenschwiler, 1994
- Pseudobankesia leleupiella Henderickx, 1997
- Psyche casta (Pallas, 1767)
- Psyche crassiorella Bruand, 1851
- Psyche pyrenaea (Bourgogne, 1961)
- Psychidea nudella (Ochsenheimer, 1810)
- Ptilocephala agrostidis (Schrank, 1802)
- Ptilocephala albida (Esper, 1786)
- Ptilocephala ardanazi (Agenjo, 1954)
- Ptilocephala colossa (A. Bang-Haas, 1907)
- Ptilocephala fulminella (Milliere, 1865)
- Ptilocephala leschenaulti (Staudinger, 1860)
- Ptilocephala lessei (Bourgogne, 1954)
- Ptilocephala malvinella (Milliere, 1858)
- Ptilocephala matthesi (Bourgogne, 1954)
- Ptilocephala melanura (Bourgogne, 1954)
- Ptilocephala moncaunella (Chapman, 1903)
- Ptilocephala monteiroi (Bourgogne, 1953)
- Ptilocephala muscella (Denis & Schiffermuller, 1775)
- Ptilocephala piae Hattenschwiler, 1996
- Ptilocephala plumifera (Ochsenheimer, 1810)
- Ptilocephala pyrenaella (Herrich-Schäffer, 1852)
- Ptilocephala sicheliella (Bruand, 1858)
- Ptilocephala silphella (Milliere, 1871)
- Ptilocephala triaena (Bourgogne, 1940)
- Pygmaeotinea crisostomella Amsel, 1957
- Rebelia surientella (Bruand, 1858)
- Sterrhopterix fusca (Haworth, 1809)
- Taleporia improvisella Staudinger, 1859
- Taleporia politella (Ochsenheimer, 1816)
- Taleporia tubulosa (Retzius, 1783)
- Typhonia ciliaris (Ochsenheimer, 1810)

== Pterolonchidae ==
- Pterolonche gozmaniella Vives, 1984
- Pterolonche lutescentella Chretien, 1922
- Pterolonche pulverulenta Zeller, 1847
- Pterolonche albescens Zeller, 1847
- Pterolonche inspersa Staudinger, 1859

== Pterophoridae ==
- Adaina microdactyla (Hübner, 1813)
- Agdistis adactyla (Hübner, 1819)
- Agdistis bennetii (Curtis, 1833)
- Agdistis betica Arenberger, 1978
- Agdistis bifurcatus Agenjo, 1952
- Agdistis espunae Arenberger, 1978
- Agdistis frankeniae (Zeller, 1847)
- Agdistis gittia Arenberger, 1988
- Agdistis glaseri Arenberger, 1978
- Agdistis hartigi Arenberger, 1973
- Agdistis heydeni (Zeller, 1852)
- Agdistis manicata Staudinger, 1859
- Agdistis melitensis Amsel, 1954
- Agdistis meridionalis (Zeller, 1847)
- Agdistis neglecta Arenberger, 1976
- Agdistis paralia (Zeller, 1847)
- Agdistis pseudocanariensis Arenberger, 1973
- Agdistis satanas Milliere, 1875
- Agdistis tamaricis (Zeller, 1847)
- Amblyptilia acanthadactyla (Hübner, 1813)
- Amblyptilia punctidactyla (Haworth, 1811)
- Buckleria paludum (Zeller, 1839)
- Calyciphora adamas (Constant, 1895)
- Calyciphora albodactylus (Fabricius, 1794)
- Calyciphora nephelodactyla (Eversmann, 1844)
- Capperia bonneaui Bigot, 1987
- Capperia britanniodactylus (Gregson, 1867)
- Capperia celeusi (Frey, 1886)
- Capperia fusca (O. Hofmann, 1898)
- Capperia hellenica Adamczewski, 1951
- Capperia loranus (Fuchs, 1895)
- Capperia maratonica Adamczewski, 1951
- Cnaemidophorus rhododactyla (Denis & Schiffermuller, 1775)
- Crombrugghia distans (Zeller, 1847)
- Crombrugghia kollari (Stainton, 1851)
- Crombrugghia laetus (Zeller, 1847)
- Crombrugghia tristis (Zeller, 1841)
- Emmelina argoteles (Meyrick, 1922)
- Emmelina monodactyla (Linnaeus, 1758)
- Geina didactyla (Linnaeus, 1758)
- Gillmeria pallidactyla (Haworth, 1811)
- Gypsochares bigoti Gibeaux & Nel, 1989
- Hellinsia carphodactyla (Hübner, 1813)
- Hellinsia inulae (Zeller, 1852)
- Hellinsia osteodactylus (Zeller, 1841)
- Hellinsia pectodactylus (Staudinger, 1859)
- Lantanophaga pusillidactylus (Walker, 1864)
- Marasmarcha lunaedactyla (Haworth, 1811)
- Marasmarcha oxydactylus (Staudinger, 1859)
- Megalorhipida leucodactylus (Fabricius, 1794)
- Merrifieldia baliodactylus (Zeller, 1841)
- Merrifieldia chordodactylus (Staudinger, 1859)
- Merrifieldia leucodactyla (Denis & Schiffermuller, 1775)
- Merrifieldia malacodactylus (Zeller, 1847)
- Merrifieldia tridactyla (Linnaeus, 1758)
- Oidaematophorus constanti Ragonot, 1875
- Oidaematophorus giganteus (Mann, 1855)
- Oidaematophorus lithodactyla (Treitschke, 1833)
- Oidaematophorus rogenhoferi (Mann, 1871)
- Oxyptilus chrysodactyla (Denis & Schiffermuller, 1775)
- Oxyptilus ericetorum (Stainton, 1851)
- Oxyptilus parvidactyla (Haworth, 1811)
- Oxyptilus pilosellae (Zeller, 1841)
- Platyptilia calodactyla (Denis & Schiffermuller, 1775)
- Platyptilia farfarellus Zeller, 1867
- Platyptilia gonodactyla (Denis & Schiffermuller, 1775)
- Platyptilia iberica Rebel, 1935
- Platyptilia isodactylus (Zeller, 1852)
- Platyptilia tesseradactyla (Linnaeus, 1761)
- Procapperia maculatus (Constant, 1865)
- Pterophorus ischnodactyla (Treitschke, 1835)
- Pterophorus pentadactyla (Linnaeus, 1758)
- Puerphorus olbiadactylus (Milliere, 1859)
- Stangeia siceliota (Zeller, 1847)
- Stenoptilia aridus (Zeller, 1847)
- Stenoptilia bipunctidactyla (Scopoli, 1763)
- Stenoptilia coprodactylus (Stainton, 1851)
- Stenoptilia elkefi Arenberger, 1984
- Stenoptilia graphodactyla (Treitschke, 1833)
- Stenoptilia gratiolae Gibeaux & Nel, 1990
- Stenoptilia hahni Arenberger, 1989
- Stenoptilia lutescens (Herrich-Schäffer, 1855)
- Stenoptilia millieridactylus (Bruand, 1861)
- Stenoptilia mimula Gibeaux, 1985
- Stenoptilia nepetellae Bigot & Picard, 1983
- Stenoptilia pelidnodactyla (Stein, 1837)
- Stenoptilia pterodactyla (Linnaeus, 1761)
- Stenoptilia reisseri Rebel, 1935
- Stenoptilia stigmatodactylus (Zeller, 1852)
- Stenoptilia zophodactylus (Duponchel, 1840)
- Stenoptilodes taprobanes (Felder & Rogenhofer, 1875)
- Tabulaephorus punctinervis (Constant, 1885)
- Wheeleria raphiodactyla (Rebel, 1901)
- Wheeleria spilodactylus (Curtis, 1827)

== Pyralidae ==
- Achroia grisella (Fabricius, 1794)
- Acrobasis advenella (Zincken, 1818)
- Acrobasis bithynella Zeller, 1848
- Acrobasis centunculella (Mann, 1859)
- Acrobasis consociella (Hübner, 1813)
- Acrobasis dulcella (Zeller, 1848)
- Acrobasis glaucella Staudinger, 1859
- Acrobasis legatea (Haworth, 1811)
- Acrobasis marmorea (Haworth, 1811)
- Acrobasis obliqua (Zeller, 1847)
- Acrobasis obtusella (Hübner, 1796)
- Acrobasis porphyrella (Duponchel, 1836)
- Acrobasis repandana (Fabricius, 1798)
- Acrobasis romanella (Milliere, 1870)
- Acrobasis sodalella Zeller, 1848
- Acrobasis suavella (Zincken, 1818)
- Acrobasis tumidana (Denis & Schiffermuller, 1775)
- Acrobasis xanthogramma (Staudinger, 1870)
- Aglossa brabanti Ragonot, 1884
- Aglossa caprealis (Hübner, 1809)
- Aglossa dimidiatus (Haworth, 1809)
- Aglossa pinguinalis (Linnaeus, 1758)
- Alophia combustella (Herrich-Schäffer, 1855)
- Amphithrix sublineatella (Staudinger, 1859)
- Ancylodes dealbatella (Erschoff, 1874)
- Ancylodes pallens Ragonot, 1887
- Ancylosis albidella Ragonot, 1888
- Ancylosis arenosella (Staudinger, 1859)
- Ancylosis brunneella (Chretien, 1911)
- Ancylosis calcariella (Ragonot, 1901)
- Ancylosis cinnamomella (Duponchel, 1836)
- Ancylosis convexella (Lederer, 1855)
- Ancylosis deserticola (Staudinger, 1870)
- Ancylosis gracilella Ragonot, 1887
- Ancylosis harmoniella (Ragonot, 1887)
- Ancylosis imitella Hampson, 1901
- Ancylosis maculifera Staudinger, 1870
- Ancylosis oblitella (Zeller, 1848)
- Ancylosis ochracea (Staudinger, 1870)
- Ancylosis pectinatella (Ragonot, 1887)
- Ancylosis rhodochrella (Herrich-Schäffer, 1852)
- Ancylosis roscidella (Eversmann, 1844)
- Ancylosis samaritanella (Zeller, 1867)
- Ancylosis sareptalla (Herrich-Schäffer, 1861)
- Ancylosis uncinatella (Ragonot, 1890)
- Ancylosis versicolorella (Ragonot, 1887)
- Ancylosis xylinella (Staudinger, 1870)
- Anerastia lotella (Hübner, 1813)
- Aphomia murciella (Zerny, 1914)
- Aphomia sabella (Hampson, 1901)
- Aphomia sociella (Linnaeus, 1758)
- Aphomia unicolor (Staudinger, 1880)
- Aphomia zelleri de Joannis, 1932
- Apomyelois ceratoniae (Zeller, 1839)
- Archiephestia adpiscinella (Chretien, 1911)
- Asalebria florella (Mann, 1862)
- Asalebria geminella (Eversmann, 1844)
- Asalebria pseudoflorella (A. Schmidt, 1934)
- Asalebria venustella (Ragonot, 1887)
- Asarta aethiopella (Duponchel, 1837)
- Asarta albarracinella Leraut & Luquet, 1991
- Asartodes monspesulalis (Duponchel, 1834)
- Asartodes zapateri (Ragonot, 1882)
- Assara conicolella (Constant, 1884)
- Bostra obsoletalis (Mann, 1884)
- Bradyrrhoa adrianae Asselbergs, 2002
- Bradyrrhoa cantenerella (Duponchel, 1837)
- Bradyrrhoa luteola (La Harpe, 1860)
- Bradyrrhoa marianella Ragonot, 1887
- Cadra abstersella (Zeller, 1847)
- Cadra calidella (Guenee, 1845)
- Cadra cautella (Walker, 1863)
- Cadra figulilella (Gregson, 1871)
- Cadra furcatella (Herrich-Schäffer, 1849)
- Cathayia insularum (Speidel & Schmitz, 1991)
- Corcyra cephalonica (Stainton, 1866)
- Cremnophila sedakovella (Eversmann, 1851)
- Cryptoblabes bistriga (Haworth, 1811)
- Cryptoblabes gnidiella (Milliere, 1867)
- Delplanqueia dilutella (Denis & Schiffermuller, 1775)
- Delplanqueia inscriptella (Duponchel, 1836)
- Denticera divisella (Duponchel, 1842)
- Dioryctria abietella (Denis & Schiffermuller, 1775)
- Dioryctria aulloi Barbey, 1930
- Dioryctria mendacella (Staudinger, 1859)
- Dioryctria pineae (Staudinger, 1859)
- Dioryctria robiniella (Milliere, 1865)
- Dioryctria sylvestrella (Ratzeburg, 1840)
- Eccopisa effractella Zeller, 1848
- Elegia fallax (Staudinger, 1881)
- Elegia similella (Zincken, 1818)
- Ematheudes punctella (Treitschke, 1833)
- Emmalocera anerastica (Snellen, 1879)
- Endotricha flammealis (Denis & Schiffermuller, 1775)
- Ephestia disparella Hampson, 1901
- Ephestia elutella (Hübner, 1796)
- Ephestia inquietella Zerny, 1932
- Ephestia kuehniella Zeller, 1879
- Ephestia mistralella (Milliere, 1874)
- Ephestia parasitella Staudinger, 1859
- Ephestia unicolorella Staudinger, 1881
- Ephestia welseriella (Zeller, 1848)
- Epidauria strigosa (Staudinger, 1879)
- Epischidia fulvostrigella (Eversmann, 1844)
- Epischnia asteris Staudinger, 1870
- Epischnia castillella Ragonot, 1894
- Epischnia illotella Zeller, 1839
- Epischnia leucoloma Herrich-Schäffer, 1849
- Epischnia prodromella (Hübner, 1799)
- Episcythrastis tabidella (Mann, 1864)
- Episcythrastis tetricella (Denis & Schiffermuller, 1775)
- Etiella zinckenella (Treitschke, 1832)
- Eurhodope cirrigerella (Zincken, 1818)
- Eurhodope cruentella (Duponchel, 1843)
- Eurhodope incensella (Staudinger, 1859)
- Eurhodope rosella (Scopoli, 1763)
- Euzophera bigella (Zeller, 1848)
- Euzophera cinerosella (Zeller, 1839)
- Euzophera fuliginosella (Heinemann, 1865)
- Euzophera lunulella (O. Costa, 1836)
- Euzophera osseatella (Treitschke, 1832)
- Euzophera pinguis (Haworth, 1811)
- Euzophera subcribrella Ragonot, 1887
- Euzopherodes vapidella (Mann, 1857)
- Faveria dionysia (Zeller, 1846)
- Galleria mellonella (Linnaeus, 1758)
- Glyptoteles leucacrinella Zeller, 1848
- Gymnancyla canella (Denis & Schiffermuller, 1775)
- Gymnancyla hornigii (Lederer, 1852)
- Gymnancyla ruscinonella Ragonot, 1888
- Gymnancyla sfakesella Chretien, 1911
- Homoeosoma inustella Ragonot, 1884
- Homoeosoma nebulella (Denis & Schiffermuller, 1775)
- Homoeosoma nevadellum Roesler, 1965
- Homoeosoma nimbella (Duponchel, 1837)
- Homoeosoma sinuella (Fabricius, 1794)
- Homoeosoma soaltheirellum Roesler, 1965
- Hypochalcia ahenella (Denis & Schiffermuller, 1775)
- Hypochalcia lignella (Hübner, 1796)
- Hypotia colchicalis (Herrich-Schäffer, 1851)
- Hypotia corticalis (Denis & Schiffermuller, 1775)
- Hypotia infulalis Lederer, 1858
- Hypotia leucographalis (Hampson, 1900)
- Hypotia massilialis (Duponchel, 1832)
- Hypotia miegi Ragonot, 1895
- Hypotia numidalis (Hampson, 1900)
- Hypotia pectinalis (Herrich-Schäffer, 1838)
- Hypsopygia costalis (Fabricius, 1775)
- Hypsopygia fulvocilialis (Duponchel, 1834)
- Hypsopygia glaucinalis (Linnaeus, 1758)
- Hypsopygia incarnatalis (Zeller, 1847)
- Hypsopygia rubidalis (Denis & Schiffermuller, 1775)
- Hypsotropa vulneratella (Zeller, 1847)
- Isauria dilucidella (Duponchel, 1836)
- Khorassania compositella (Treitschke, 1835)
- Laetilia loxogramma (Staudinger, 1870)
- Lamoria anella (Denis & Schiffermuller, 1775)
- Lamoria jordanis Ragonot, 1901
- Loryma egregialis (Herrich-Schäffer, 1838)
- Matilella fusca (Haworth, 1811)
- Megasis rippertella (Zeller, 1839)
- Merulempista cingillella (Zeller, 1846)
- Merulempista ragonoti Rothschild, 1913
- Merulempista turturella (Zeller, 1848)
- Metallostichodes nigrocyanella (Constant, 1865)
- Moitrelia boeticella (Ragonot, 1887)
- Moitrelia hispanella Staudinger, 1859
- Moitrelia italogallicella (Milliere, 1882)
- Moitrelia obductella (Zeller, 1839)
- Myelois circumvoluta (Fourcroy, 1785)
- Myelois fuscicostella Mann, 1861
- Nephopterix angustella (Hübner, 1796)
- Neurotomia coenulentella (Zeller, 1846)
- Niethammeriodes diremptella (Ragonot, 1887)
- Niethammeriodes ustella (Ragonot, 1887)
- Nyctegretis lineana (Scopoli, 1786)
- Nyctegretis ruminella La Harpe, 1860
- Oncocera semirubella (Scopoli, 1763)
- Oxybia transversella (Duponchel, 1836)
- Paramaxillaria amatrix (Zerny, 1927)
- Pempelia albariella Zeller, 1839
- Pempelia brephiella (Staudinger, 1879)
- Pempelia genistella (Duponchel, 1836)
- Pempelia palumbella (Denis & Schiffermuller, 1775)
- Pempeliella ardosiella (Ragonot, 1887)
- Pempeliella enderleini (Rebel, 1934)
- Pempeliella malacella (Staudinger, 1870)
- Pempeliella ornatella (Denis & Schiffermuller, 1775)
- Pempeliella sororiella Zeller, 1839
- Phycita coronatella (Guenee, 1845)
- Phycita diaphana (Staudinger, 1870)
- Phycita poteriella (Zeller, 1846)
- Phycita roborella (Denis & Schiffermuller, 1775)
- Phycita strigata (Staudinger, 1879)
- Phycita torrenti Agenjo, 1962
- Phycitodes albatella (Ragonot, 1887)
- Phycitodes binaevella (Hübner, 1813)
- Phycitodes eliseannae Leraut, 2002
- Phycitodes inquinatella (Ragonot, 1887)
- Phycitodes lacteella (Rothschild, 1915)
- Phycitodes saxicola (Vaughan, 1870)
- Phycitodes subcretacella (Ragonot, 1901)
- Pima boisduvaliella (Guenee, 1845)
- Plodia interpunctella (Hübner, 1813)
- Polyochodes stipella Chretien, 1911
- Praeepischnia nevadensis (Rebel, 1910)
- Pseudacrobasis nankingella Roesler, 1975
- Psorosa dahliella (Treitschke, 1832)
- Psorosa flavifasciella Hampson, 1901
- Psorosa mediterranella Amsel, 1953
- Pterothrixidia rufella (Duponchel, 1836)
- Pyralis farinalis (Linnaeus, 1758)
- Pyralis lienigialis (Zeller, 1843)
- Pyralis regalis Denis & Schiffermuller, 1775
- Raphimetopus ablutella (Zeller, 1839)
- Rhodophaea formosa (Haworth, 1811)
- Salebriopsis albicilla (Herrich-Schäffer, 1849)
- Sciota rhenella (Zincken, 1818)
- Sciota rungsi Leraut, 2002
- Seeboldia korgosella Ragonot, 1887
- Selagia argyrella (Denis & Schiffermuller, 1775)
- Selagia subochrella (Herrich-Schäffer, 1849)
- Seleucia karsholti Vives, 1995
- Stanempista schawerdae (Zerny, 1927)
- Stemmatophora borgialis (Duponchel, 1832)
- Stemmatophora brunnealis (Treitschke, 1829)
- Stemmatophora combustalis (Fischer v. Röslerstamm, 1842)
- Stemmatophora gadesalis Ragonot, 1882
- Stemmatophora gredalis Zerny, 1935
- Stemmatophora honestalis (Treitschke, 1829)
- Stemmatophora rungsi Leraut, 2000
- Stemmatophora syriacalis (Ragonot, 1895)
- Stemmatophora vulpecalis Ragonot, 1891
- Sudaniola remanella Roesler, 1973
- Synaphe antennalis (Fabricius, 1794)
- Synaphe bombycalis (Denis & Schiffermuller, 1775)
- Synaphe chellalalis (Hampson, 1900)
- Synaphe diffidalis (Guenee, 1854)
- Synaphe interjunctalis (Guenee, 1849)
- Synaphe lorquinalis (Guenee, 1854)
- Synaphe moldavica (Esper, 1794)
- Synaphe oculatalis (Ragonot, 1885)
- Synaphe predotalis (Zerny, 1927)
- Synaphe punctalis (Fabricius, 1775)
- Tephris cyriella (Erschoff, 1874)
- Trachonitis capensis Hampson, 1901
- Trachonitis cristella (Denis & Schiffermuller, 1775)
- Tsaraphycis mimeticella (Staudinger, 1879)
- Valdovecaria bradyrrhoella Zerny, 1927
- Valdovecaria hispanicella (Herrich-Schäffer, 1855)
- Vitula biviella (Zeller, 1848)
- Zophodia grossulariella (Hübner, 1809)

== Riodinidae ==
- Hamearis lucina (Linnaeus, 1758)

== Saturniidae ==
- Actias isabellae (Graells, 1849)
- Aglia tau (Linnaeus, 1758)
- Antheraea pernyi (Guerin-Meneville, 1855)
- Samia cynthia (Drury, 1773)
- Saturnia pavonia (Linnaeus, 1758)
- Saturnia pyri (Denis & Schiffermuller, 1775)

== Schreckensteiniidae ==
- Schreckensteinia festaliella (Hübner, 1819)

== Scythrididae ==
- Apostibes raguae Bengtsson, 1997
- Enolmis abenhumeya (Agenjo, 1951)
- Enolmis acanthella (Godart, 1824)
- Enolmis bimerdella (Staudinger, 1859)
- Enolmis delicatella (Rebel, 1901)
- Enolmis delnoydella Groenen & Schreurs, 2016
- Enolmis nevadensis Passerin d'Entreves, 1997
- Enolmis seeboldiella (Agenjo, 1951)
- Enolmis sierraenevadae Passerin d'Entreves, 1997
- Enolmis userai (Agenjo, 1962)
- Enolmis vivesi Bengtsson & Passerin d'Entreves, 1987
- Episcythris triangulella (Ragonot, 1874)
- Eretmocera medinella (Staudinger, 1859)
- Scythris acipenserella K. & T. Nupponen, 2000
- Scythris aenea Passerin d'Entreves, 1984
- Scythris amphonycella (Geyer, 1836)
- Scythris andersi Bengtsson, 1991
- Scythris anomaloptera (Staudinger, 1880)
- Scythris arenbergeri Passerin d'Entreves, 1986
- Scythris bazaensis Bengtsson, 1997
- Scythris bengtbengtssoni Vives, 1994
- Scythris binotiferella (Ragonot, 1880)
- Scythris bornicensis Jackh, 1977
- Scythris braschiella (O. Hofmann, 1897)
- Scythris cicadella (Zeller, 1839)
- Scythris cistorum (Milliere, 1876)
- Scythris clavella (Zeller, 1855)
- Scythris corleyi Bengtsson, 1997
- Scythris crassiuscula (Herrich-Schäffer, 1855)
- Scythris cupreella (Staudinger, 1859)
- Scythris cuspidella (Denis & Schiffermuller, 1775)
- Scythris disparella (Tengstrom, 1848)
- Scythris dissimilella (Herrich-Schäffer, 1855)
- Scythris dorycniella (Milliere, 1861)
- Scythris elegantella (D. Lucas, 1955)
- Scythris empetrella Karsholt & Nielsen, 1976
- Scythris ericetella (Heinemann, 1872)
- Scythris ericivorella (Ragonot, 1880)
- Scythris fallacella (Schlager, 1847)
- Scythris fasciatella (Ragonot, 1880)
- Scythris flavilaterella (Fuchs, 1886)
- Scythris fuscoaenea (Haworth, 1828)
- Scythris garciapitai Vives, 2001
- Scythris gladiella Nupponen & Nupponen, 2004
- Scythris grandipennis (Haworth, 1828)
- Scythris gratiosella Jackh, 1978
- Scythris gravatella (Zeller, 1847)
- Scythris iagella Chretien, 1925
- Scythris iberica Jackh, 1978
- Scythris imperiella Jackh, 1978
- Scythris inertella (Zeller, 1855)
- Scythris insulella (Staudinger, 1859)
- Scythris karinae Bengtsson, 1991
- Scythris knochella (Fabricius, 1794)
- Scythris lafauryi Passerin d'Entreves, 1986
- Scythris lampyrella (Constant, 1865)
- Scythris langohri Passerin d'Entreves, 1990
- Scythris latilineella K. Nupponen, 2013
- Scythris lempkei Bengtsson & Langohr, 1989
- Scythris levantina Passerin d'Entreves & Vives, 1990
- Scythris lhommei Bengtsson & Passerin d'Entreves, 1988
- Scythris limbella (Fabricius, 1775)
- Scythris lobella K. Nupponen, 2013
- Scythris mariannae Bengtsson, 1991
- Scythris martini Bengtsson, 1991
- Scythris minima Bengtsson, 1997
- Scythris moldavicella Caradja, 1905
- Scythris mus Walsingham, 1898
- Scythris nevadensis Passerin d'Entreves, 1990
- Scythris nieukerkeni Bengtsson, 1989
- Scythris obscurella (Scopoli, 1763)
- Scythris parafuscoaenea Bengtsson, 1991
- Scythris picaepennis (Haworth, 1828)
- Scythris pilella Bengtsson, 1991
- Scythris popescugorji Passerin d'Entreves, 1984
- Scythris potentillella (Zeller, 1847)
- Scythris productella (Zeller, 1839)
- Scythris pseudolocustella Passerin d'Entreves & Vives, 1990
- Scythris pulicella (Staudinger, 1859)
- Scythris ridiculella Caradja, 1920
- Scythris rondaensis Bengtsson, 1997
- Scythris rubioi Agenjo, 1962
- Scythris saarelai K. & T. Nupponen, 1999
- Scythris salviella Meess, 1910
- Scythris sappadensis Bengtsson, 1992
- Scythris scipionella (Staudinger, 1859)
- Scythris scopolella (Linnaeus, 1767)
- Scythris scorpionella Jackh, 1977
- Scythris seliniella (Zeller, 1839)
- Scythris siccella (Zeller, 1839)
- Scythris staudingeri Jackh, 1978
- Scythris subfasciata (Staudinger, 1880)
- Scythris subseliniella (Heinemann, 1876)
- Scythris tabidella (Herrich-Schäffer, 1855)
- Scythris tenuivittella (Stainton, 1867)
- Scythris tergestinella (Zeller, 1855)
- Scythris traugotti Bengtsson, 1991
- Scythris tributella (Zeller, 1847)
- Scythris vartianae Kasy, 1962
- Scythris veletae Passerin d'Entreves, 1990
- Scythris ventosella Chretien, 1907
- Scythris villari Agenjo, 1971
- Scythris vittella (O. Costa, 1834)
- Scythris xanthopygella (Staudinger, 1859)

== Sesiidae ==
- Bembecia abromeiti Kallies & Riefenstahl, 2000
- Bembecia albanensis (Rebel, 1918)
- Bembecia fibigeri Z. Lastuvka & A. Lastuvka, 1994
- Bembecia himmighoffeni (Staudinger, 1866)
- Bembecia hymenopteriformis (Bellier, 1860)
- Bembecia iberica Spatenka, 1992
- Bembecia ichneumoniformis (Denis & Schiffermuller, 1775)
- Bembecia psoraleae Bartsch & Bettag, 1997
- Bembecia scopigera (Scopoli, 1763)
- Bembecia sirphiformis (Lucas, 1849)
- Bembecia uroceriformis (Treitschke, 1834)
- Chamaesphecia aerifrons (Zeller, 1847)
- Chamaesphecia bibioniformis (Esper, 1800)
- Chamaesphecia empiformis (Esper, 1783)
- Chamaesphecia euceraeformis (Ochsenheimer, 1816)
- Chamaesphecia leucopsiformis (Esper, 1800)
- Chamaesphecia maurusia Pungeler, 1912
- Chamaesphecia mysiniformis (Boisduval, 1840)
- Chamaesphecia ramburi (Staudinger, 1866)
- Chamaesphecia tenthrediniformis (Denis & Schiffermuller, 1775)
- Paranthrene insolitus Le Cerf, 1914
- Paranthrene tabaniformis (Rottemburg, 1775)
- Pennisetia hylaeiformis (Laspeyres, 1801)
- Pyropteron affinis (Staudinger, 1856)
- Pyropteron aistleitneri (Spatenka, 1992)
- Pyropteron chrysidiformis (Esper, 1782)
- Pyropteron doryliformis (Ochsenheimer, 1808)
- Pyropteron hispanica (Kallies, 1999)
- Pyropteron kautzi (Reisser, 1930)
- Pyropteron koschwitzi (Spatenka, 1992)
- Pyropteron leucomelaena (Zeller, 1847)
- Pyropteron meriaeformis (Boisduval, 1840)
- Pyropteron muscaeformis (Esper, 1783)
- Sesia apiformis (Clerck, 1759)
- Sesia bembeciformis (Hübner, 1806)
- Sesia melanocephala Dalman, 1816
- Synanthedon andrenaeformis (Laspeyres, 1801)
- Synanthedon codeti (Oberthur, 1881)
- Synanthedon conopiformis (Esper, 1782)
- Synanthedon cruciati Bettag & Blasius, 2002
- Synanthedon culiciformis (Linnaeus, 1758)
- Synanthedon formicaeformis (Esper, 1783)
- Synanthedon loranthi (Kralicek, 1966)
- Synanthedon mesiaeformis (Herrich-Schäffer, 1846)
- Synanthedon myopaeformis (Borkhausen, 1789)
- Synanthedon scoliaeformis (Borkhausen, 1789)
- Synanthedon spheciformis (Denis & Schiffermuller, 1775)
- Synanthedon spuleri (Fuchs, 1908)
- Synanthedon stomoxiformis (Hübner, 1790)
- Synanthedon theryi Le Cerf, 1916
- Synanthedon tipuliformis (Clerck, 1759)
- Synanthedon vespiformis (Linnaeus, 1761)
- Tinthia tineiformis (Esper, 1789)

== Somabrachyidae ==
- Somabrachys aegrota (Klug, 1830)

== Sphingidae ==
- Acherontia atropos (Linnaeus, 1758)
- Agrius convolvuli (Linnaeus, 1758)
- Daphnis nerii (Linnaeus, 1758)
- Deilephila elpenor (Linnaeus, 1758)
- Deilephila porcellus (Linnaeus, 1758)
- Hemaris fuciformis (Linnaeus, 1758)
- Hemaris tityus (Linnaeus, 1758)
- Hippotion celerio (Linnaeus, 1758)
- Hippotion osiris (Dalman, 1823)
- Hyles dahlii (Geyer, 1828)
- Hyles euphorbiae (Linnaeus, 1758)
- Hyles gallii (Rottemburg, 1775)
- Hyles livornica (Esper, 1780)
- Hyles nicaea (de Prunner, 1798)
- Laothoe populi (Linnaeus, 1758)
- Macroglossum stellatarum (Linnaeus, 1758)
- Marumba quercus (Denis & Schiffermuller, 1775)
- Mimas tiliae (Linnaeus, 1758)
- Polyptychus trisecta (Aurivillius, 1901)
- Proserpinus proserpina (Pallas, 1772)
- Smerinthus ocellata (Linnaeus, 1758)
- Sphinx ligustri Linnaeus, 1758
- Sphinx maurorum (Jordan, 1931)

== Stathmopodidae ==
- Neomariania partinicensis (Rebel, 1937)
- Neomariania rebeli (Walsingham, 1894)
- Stathmopoda pedella (Linnaeus, 1761)
- Tortilia flavella Chretien, 1908

== Thyrididae ==
- Thyris fenestrella (Scopoli, 1763)

== Tineidae ==
- Anomalotinea chellalalis (Rebel, 1901)
- Anomalotinea cubiculella (Staudinger, 1859)
- Anomalotinea liguriella (Milliere, 1879)
- Ateliotum hungaricellum Zeller, 1839
- Ateliotum insulare (Rebel, 1896)
- Ateliotum petrinella (Herrich-Schäffer, 1854)
- Cephimallota crassiflavella Bruand, 1851
- Cephimallota tunesiella (Zagulajev, 1966)
- Ceratobia ratjadae Passerin d'Entreves, 1978
- Ceratuncus danubiella (Mann, 1866)
- Ceratuncus dzhungaricus Zagulajev, 1971
- Crassicornella agenjoi (Petersen, 1957)
- Dryadaula heindeli Gaedike & Scholz, 1998
- Elatobia fuliginosella (Lienig & Zeller, 1846)
- Eudarcia glaseri (Petersen, 1967)
- Eudarcia alberti (Amsel, 1957)
- Eudarcia leopoldella (O. G. Costa, 1836)
- Gaedikeia kokkariensis Sutter, 1998
- Infurcitinea albicomella (Stainton, 1851)
- Infurcitinea albulella (Rebel, 1935)
- Infurcitinea argentimaculella (Stainton, 1849)
- Infurcitinea atrifasciella (Staudinger, 1871)
- Infurcitinea captans Gozmany, 1960
- Infurcitinea finalis Gozmany, 1959
- Infurcitinea frustigerella (Walsingham, 1907)
- Infurcitinea gaedikei Baldizzone, 1984
- Infurcitinea italica (Amsel, 1954)
- Infurcitinea karadaghica Zagulajev, 1979
- Infurcitinea marcunella (Rebel, 1910)
- Infurcitinea minuscula Gozmany, 1960
- Infurcitinea monteiroi Amsel, 1957
- Infurcitinea parentii Petersen, 1964
- Infurcitinea peterseni Baldizzone, 1984
- Infurcitinea roesslerella (Heyden, 1865)
- Infurcitinea rumelicella (Rebel, 1903)
- Infurcitinea vartianae Petersen, 1962
- Ischnoscia borreonella (Milliere, 1874)
- Lichenotinea pustulatella (Zeller, 1852)
- Monopis crocicapitella (Clemens, 1859)
- Monopis imella (Hübner, 1813)
- Monopis laevigella (Denis & Schiffermuller, 1775)
- Monopis monachella (Hübner, 1796)
- Monopis nigricantella (Milliere, 1872)
- Monopis obviella (Denis & Schiffermuller, 1775)
- Monopis weaverella (Scott, 1858)
- Morophaga choragella (Denis & Schiffermuller, 1775)
- Morophaga morella (Duponchel, 1838)
- Myrmecozela ataxella (Chretien, 1905)
- Myrmecozela diacona Walsingham, 1907
- Myrmecozela lambessella Rebel, 1901
- Myrmecozela ochraceella (Tengstrom, 1848)
- Myrmecozela sordidella Zagulajev, 1975
- Nemapogon agenjoi Petersen, 1959
- Nemapogon clematella (Fabricius, 1781)
- Nemapogon cloacella (Haworth, 1828)
- Nemapogon granella (Linnaeus, 1758)
- Nemapogon hispanica Petersen & Gaedike, 1992
- Nemapogon inconditella (Lucas, 1956)
- Nemapogon nevadella (Caradja, 1920)
- Nemapogon nigralbella (Zeller, 1839)
- Nemapogon ruricolella (Stainton, 1849)
- Nemapogon variatella (Clemens, 1859)
- Neurothaumasia ankerella (Mann, 1867)
- Neurothaumasia ragusaella (Wocke, 1889)
- Niditinea fuscella (Linnaeus, 1758)
- Niditinea truncicolella (Tengstrom, 1848)
- Novotinea albarracinella Petersen, 1967
- Novotinea andalusiella Petersen, 1964
- Novotinea muricolella (Fuchs, 1879)
- Oinophila v-flava (Haworth, 1828)
- Opogona omoscopa (Meyrick, 1893)
- Opogona sacchari (Bojer, 1856)
- Pachyarthra mediterranea (Baker, 1894)
- Phereoeca lodli Vives, 2001
- Proterospastis merdella (Zeller, 1847)
- Proterospastis quadruplella (Caradja, 1920)
- Reisserita chrysopterella (Herrich-Schäffer, 1854)
- Reisserita haasi (Rebel, 1901)
- Reisserita parva Petersen & Gaedike, 1979
- Reisserita zernyi Petersen, 1957
- Rhodobates friedeli Petersen, 1987
- Rhodobates unicolor (Staudinger, 1870)
- Stenoptinea cyaneimarmorella (Milliere, 1854)
- Tenaga nigripunctella (Haworth, 1828)
- Tenaga rhenania (Petersen, 1962)
- Tinea basifasciella Ragonot, 1895
- Tinea columbariella Wocke, 1877
- Tinea dubiella Stainton, 1859
- Tinea flavescentella Haworth, 1828
- Tinea flavofimbriella (Chretien, 1925)
- Tinea lanella Pierce & Metcalfe, 1934
- Tinea messalina Robinson, 1979
- Tinea murariella Staudinger, 1859
- Tinea pellionella Linnaeus, 1758
- Tinea semifulvella Haworth, 1828
- Tinea translucens Meyrick, 1917
- Tinea trinotella Thunberg, 1794
- Tineola bisselliella (Hummel, 1823)
- Triaxomasia caprimulgella (Stainton, 1851)
- Triaxomera parasitella (Hübner, 1796)
- Trichophaga bipartitella (Ragonot, 1892)
- Trichophaga tapetzella (Linnaeus, 1758)

== Tischeriidae ==
- Coptotriche angusticollella (Duponchel, 1843)
- Coptotriche berberella (De Prins, 1984)
- Coptotriche marginea (Haworth, 1828)
- Tischeria decidua Wocke, 1876
- Tischeria ekebladella (Bjerkander, 1795)
- Tischeria ekebladoides Puplesis & Diskus, 2003

== Tortricidae ==
- Acleris bergmanniana (Linnaeus, 1758)
- Acleris comariana (Lienig & Zeller, 1846)
- Acleris cristana (Denis & Schiffermuller, 1775)
- Acleris emargana (Fabricius, 1775)
- Acleris ferrugana (Denis & Schiffermuller, 1775)
- Acleris forsskaleana (Linnaeus, 1758)
- Acleris hastiana (Linnaeus, 1758)
- Acleris holmiana (Linnaeus, 1758)
- Acleris hyemana (Haworth, 1811)
- Acleris kochiella (Goeze, 1783)
- Acleris laterana (Fabricius, 1794)
- Acleris lipsiana (Denis & Schiffermuller, 1775)
- Acleris literana (Linnaeus, 1758)
- Acleris logiana (Clerck, 1759)
- Acleris notana (Donovan, 1806)
- Acleris permutana (Duponchel, 1836)
- Acleris quercinana (Zeller, 1849)
- Acleris rhombana (Denis & Schiffermuller, 1775)
- Acleris rufana (Denis & Schiffermuller, 1775)
- Acleris schalleriana (Linnaeus, 1761)
- Acleris sparsana (Denis & Schiffermuller, 1775)
- Acleris undulana (Walsingham, 1900)
- Acleris variegana (Denis & Schiffermuller, 1775)
- Acroclita subsequana (Herrich-Schäffer, 1851)
- Adoxophyes orana (Fischer v. Röslerstamm, 1834)
- Aethes ardezana (Muller-Rutz, 1922)
- Aethes beatricella (Walsingham, 1898)
- Aethes bilbaensis (Rossler, 1877)
- Aethes deaurana (Peyerimhoff, 1877)
- Aethes decimana (Denis & Schiffermuller, 1775)
- Aethes dilucidana (Stephens, 1852)
- Aethes fennicana (M. Hering, 1924)
- Aethes flagellana (Duponchel, 1836)
- Aethes francillana (Fabricius, 1794)
- Aethes hartmanniana (Clerck, 1759)
- Aethes kindermanniana (Treitschke, 1830)
- Aethes languidana (Mann, 1855)
- Aethes margaritana (Haworth, 1811)
- Aethes margarotana (Duponchel, 1836)
- Aethes mauritanica (Walsingham, 1898)
- Aethes moribundana (Staudinger, 1859)
- Aethes perfidana (Kennel, 1900)
- Aethes piercei Obraztsov, 1952
- Aethes rubiginana (Walsingham, 1903)
- Aethes rutilana (Hübner, 1817)
- Aethes sanguinana (Treitschke, 1830)
- Aethes scalana (Zerny, 1927)
- Aethes smeathmanniana (Fabricius, 1781)
- Aethes tesserana (Denis & Schiffermuller, 1775)
- Aethes tornella (Walsingham, 1898)
- Aethes triangulana (Treitschke, 1835)
- Aethes williana (Brahm, 1791)
- Agapeta angelana (Kennel, 1919)
- Agapeta hamana (Linnaeus, 1758)
- Agapeta zoegana (Linnaeus, 1767)
- Aleimma loeflingiana (Linnaeus, 1758)
- Ancylis achatana (Denis & Schiffermuller, 1775)
- Ancylis apicella (Denis & Schiffermuller, 1775)
- Ancylis badiana (Denis & Schiffermuller, 1775)
- Ancylis comptana (Frolich, 1828)
- Ancylis geminana (Donovan, 1806)
- Ancylis myrtillana (Treitschke, 1830)
- Ancylis obtusana (Haworth, 1811)
- Ancylis selenana (Guenee, 1845)
- Ancylis sparulana (Staudinger, 1859)
- Ancylis unculana (Haworth, 1811)
- Ancylis unguicella (Linnaeus, 1758)
- Aneuxanthis locupletana (Hübner, 1819)
- Aphelia viburniana (Denis & Schiffermuller, 1775)
- Aphelia paleana (Hübner, 1793)
- Aphelia peramplana (Hübner, 1825)
- Apotomis betuletana (Haworth, 1811)
- Apotomis turbidana Hübner, 1825
- Archips crataegana (Hübner, 1799)
- Archips oporana (Linnaeus, 1758)
- Archips podana (Scopoli, 1763)
- Archips rosana (Linnaeus, 1758)
- Archips xylosteana (Linnaeus, 1758)
- Argyroploce unedana Baixeras, 2002
- Argyrotaenia ljungiana (Thunberg, 1797)
- Aterpia anderreggana Guenee, 1845
- Avaria hyerana (Milliere, 1858)
- Bactra bactrana (Kennel, 1901)
- Bactra furfurana (Haworth, 1811)
- Bactra lancealana (Hübner, 1799)
- Bactra robustana (Christoph, 1872)
- Bactra venosana (Zeller, 1847)
- Barbara herrichiana Obraztsov, 1960
- Cacoecimorpha pronubana (Hübner, 1799)
- Celypha aurofasciana (Haworth, 1811)
- Celypha cespitana (Hübner, 1817)
- Celypha lacunana (Denis & Schiffermuller, 1775)
- Celypha rivulana (Scopoli, 1763)
- Celypha rufana (Scopoli, 1763)
- Celypha rurestrana (Duponchel, 1843)
- Celypha striana (Denis & Schiffermuller, 1775)
- Ceratoxanthis iberica Baixeras, 1992
- Choristoneura hebenstreitella (Muller, 1764)
- Choristoneura lafauryana (Ragonot, 1875)
- Clavigesta sylvestrana (Curtis, 1850)
- Clepsis agenjoi Obraztsov, 1950
- Clepsis consimilana (Hübner, 1817)
- Clepsis dumicolana (Zeller, 1847)
- Clepsis laetitiae Soria, 1997
- Clepsis neglectana (Herrich-Schäffer, 1851)
- Clepsis pallidana (Fabricius, 1776)
- Clepsis peritana (Clemens, 1860)
- Clepsis rogana (Guenee, 1845)
- Clepsis rurinana (Linnaeus, 1758)
- Clepsis senecionana (Hübner, 1819)
- Clepsis siciliana (Ragonot, 1894)
- Clepsis spectrana (Treitschke, 1830)
- Clepsis steineriana (Hübner, 1799)
- Clepsis unicolorana (Duponchel, 1835)
- Cnephasia alfacarana Razowski, 1958
- Cnephasia alticolana (Herrich-Schäffer, 1851)
- Cnephasia asseclana (Denis & Schiffermuller, 1775)
- Cnephasia bizensis Real, 1953
- Cnephasia chrysantheana (Duponchel, 1843)
- Cnephasia communana (Herrich-Schäffer, 1851)
- Cnephasia conspersana Douglas, 1846
- Cnephasia cupressivorana (Staudinger, 1871)
- Cnephasia delnoyana Groenen & Schreurs, 2012
- Cnephasia ecullyana Real, 1951
- Cnephasia fulturata Rebel, 1940
- Cnephasia genitalana Pierce & Metcalfe, 1922
- Cnephasia heinemanni Obraztsov, 1956
- Cnephasia hellenica Obraztsov, 1956
- Cnephasia laetana (Staudinger, 1871)
- Cnephasia longana (Haworth, 1811)
- Cnephasia microstrigana Razowski, 1958
- Cnephasia pasiuana (Hübner, 1799)
- Cnephasia sedana (Constant, 1884)
- Cnephasia stephensiana (Doubleday, 1849)
- Cnephasia incertana (Treitschke, 1835)
- Cochylidia heydeniana (Herrich-Schäffer, 1851)
- Cochylidia implicitana (Wocke, 1856)
- Cochylidia moguntiana (Rossler, 1864)
- Cochylidia rupicola (Curtis, 1834)
- Cochylimorpha agenjoi (Razowski, 1963)
- Cochylimorpha cultana (Lederer, 1855)
- Cochylimorpha decolorella (Zeller, 1839)
- Cochylimorpha discopunctana (Eversmann, 1844)
- Cochylimorpha elongana (Fischer v. Röslerstamm, 1839)
- Cochylimorpha hilarana (Herrich-Schäffer, 1851)
- Cochylimorpha jucundana (Treitschke, 1835)
- Cochylimorpha meridiana (Staudinger, 1859)
- Cochylimorpha peucedana (Ragonot, 1889)
- Cochylimorpha pyramidana (Staudinger, 1871)
- Cochylimorpha salinarida Groenen & Larsen, 2003
- Cochylimorpha santolinana (Staudinger, 1871)
- Cochylimorpha sparsana (Staudinger, 1879)
- Cochylimorpha straminea (Haworth, 1811)
- Cochylis atricapitana (Stephens, 1852)
- Cochylis dubitana (Hübner, 1799)
- Cochylis epilinana Duponchel, 1842
- Cochylis flaviciliana (Westwood, 1854)
- Cochylis hybridella (Hübner, 1813)
- Cochylis molliculana Zeller, 1847
- Cochylis nana (Haworth, 1811)
- Cochylis pallidana Zeller, 1847
- Cochylis posterana Zeller, 1847
- Cochylis roseana (Haworth, 1811)
- Cochylis salebrana (Mann, 1862)
- Commophila nevadensis Traugott-Olsen, 1990
- Corticivora piniana (Herrich-Schäffer, 1851)
- Crocidosema plebejana Zeller, 1847
- Cydia adenocarpi (Ragonot, 1875)
- Cydia amplana (Hübner, 1800)
- Cydia blackmoreana (Walsingham, 1903)
- Cydia conicolana (Heylaerts, 1874)
- Cydia coniferana (Saxesen, 1840)
- Cydia cosmophorana (Treitschke, 1835)
- Cydia duplicana (Zetterstedt, 1839)
- Cydia fagiglandana (Zeller, 1841)
- Cydia gilviciliana (Staudinger, 1859)
- Cydia ilipulana (Walsingham, 1903)
- Cydia interscindana (Moschler, 1866)
- Cydia intexta (Kuznetsov, 1962)
- Cydia medicaginis (Kuznetsov, 1962)
- Cydia microgrammana (Guenee, 1845)
- Cydia nigricana (Fabricius, 1794)
- Cydia oxytropidis (Martini, 1912)
- Cydia pomonella (Linnaeus, 1758)
- Cydia servillana (Duponchel, 1836)
- Cydia splendana (Hübner, 1799)
- Cydia strigulatana (Kennel, 1899)
- Cydia strobilella (Linnaeus, 1758)
- Cydia succedana (Denis & Schiffermuller, 1775)
- Cydia ulicetana (Haworth, 1811)
- Cydia vallesiaca (Sauter, 1968)
- Diceratura amaranthica Razowski, 1963
- Diceratura infantana (Kennel, 1899)
- Diceratura ostrinana (Guenee, 1845)
- Diceratura roseofasciana (Mann, 1855)
- Dichrorampha acuminatana (Lienig & Zeller, 1846)
- Dichrorampha alpinana (Treitschke, 1830)
- Dichrorampha cacaleana (Herrich-Schäffer, 1851)
- Dichrorampha chavanneana (de La Harpe, 1858)
- Dichrorampha distinctana (Heinemann, 1863)
- Dichrorampha eximia (Danilevsky, 1948)
- Dichrorampha iberica Kuznetsov, 1978
- Dichrorampha incursana (Herrich-Schäffer, 1851)
- Dichrorampha letarfensis Gibeaux, 1983
- Dichrorampha petiverella (Linnaeus, 1758)
- Dichrorampha plumbagana (Treitschke, 1830)
- Dichrorampha plumbana (Scopoli, 1763)
- Dichrorampha sedatana Busck, 1906
- Dichrorampha senectana Guenee, 1845
- Dichrorampha simpliciana (Haworth, 1811)
- Dichrorampha vancouverana McDunnough, 1935
- Ditula angustiorana (Haworth, 1811)
- Ditula joannisiana (Ragonot, 1888)
- Eana clercana (de Joannis, 1908)
- Eana cottiana (Chretien, 1898)
- Eana incanana (Stephens, 1852)
- Eana nervana (de Joannis, 1908)
- Eana nevadensis (Schawerda, 1929)
- Eana penziana (Thunberg, 1791)
- Eana argentana (Clerck, 1759)
- Eana osseana (Scopoli, 1763)
- Eana canescana (Guenee, 1845)
- Eana filipjevi (Real, 1953)
- Enarmonia formosana (Scopoli, 1763)
- Endothenia gentianaeana (Hübner, 1799)
- Endothenia marginana (Haworth, 1811)
- Endothenia nigricostana (Haworth, 1811)
- Endothenia oblongana (Haworth, 1811)
- Endothenia pauperculana (Staudinger, 1859)
- Epagoge grotiana (Fabricius, 1781)
- Epiblema cnicicolana (Zeller, 1847)
- Epiblema costipunctana (Haworth, 1811)
- Epiblema foenella (Linnaeus, 1758)
- Epiblema graphana (Treitschke, 1835)
- Epiblema hepaticana (Treitschke, 1835)
- Epiblema scutulana (Denis & Schiffermuller, 1775)
- Epiblema simploniana (Duponchel, 1835)
- Epiblema sticticana (Fabricius, 1794)
- Epichoristodes acerbella (Walker, 1864)
- Epinotia abbreviana (Fabricius, 1794)
- Epinotia brunnichana (Linnaeus, 1767)
- Epinotia cedricida Diakonoff, 1969
- Epinotia dalmatana (Rebel, 1891)
- Epinotia demarniana (Fischer v. Röslerstamm, 1840)
- Epinotia festivana (Hübner, 1799)
- Epinotia fraternana (Haworth, 1811)
- Epinotia immundana (Fischer v. Röslerstamm, 1839)
- Epinotia nanana (Treitschke, 1835)
- Epinotia nemorivaga (Tengstrom, 1848)
- Epinotia nisella (Clerck, 1759)
- Epinotia obraztsovi Agenjo, 1966
- Epinotia ramella (Linnaeus, 1758)
- Epinotia rubiginosana (Herrich-Schäffer, 1851)
- Epinotia solandriana (Linnaeus, 1758)
- Epinotia subocellana (Donovan, 1806)
- Epinotia subsequana (Haworth, 1811)
- Epinotia tenerana (Denis & Schiffermuller, 1775)
- Epinotia tetraquetrana (Haworth, 1811)
- Epinotia thapsiana (Zeller, 1847)
- Eucosma aemulana (Schlager, 1849)
- Eucosma albarracina Hartig, 1941
- Eucosma albidulana (Herrich-Schäffer, 1851)
- Eucosma albuneana (Zeller, 1847)
- Eucosma aspidiscana (Hübner, 1817)
- Eucosma cana (Haworth, 1811)
- Eucosma conterminana (Guenee, 1845)
- Eucosma cretaceana (Kennel, 1899)
- Eucosma cumulana (Guenee, 1845)
- Eucosma gonzalezalvarezi Agenjo, 1969
- Eucosma hohenwartiana (Denis & Schiffermuller, 1775)
- Eucosma lacteana (Treitschke, 1835)
- Eucosma obumbratana (Lienig & Zeller, 1846)
- Eucosma pupillana (Clerck, 1759)
- Eucosma rubescana (Constant, 1895)
- Eucosma sublucidana (Kennel, 1901)
- Eucosma urbana (Kennel, 1901)
- Eudemis profundana (Denis & Schiffermuller, 1775)
- Eugnosta lathoniana (Hübner, 1800)
- Eugnosta magnificana (Rebel, 1914)
- Eulia ministrana (Linnaeus, 1758)
- Eupoecilia ambiguella (Hübner, 1796)
- Eupoecilia angustana (Hübner, 1799)
- Exapate duratella Heyden, 1864
- Falseuncaria ruficiliana (Haworth, 1811)
- Fulvoclysia nerminae Kocak, 1982
- Grapholita funebrana Treitschke, 1835
- Grapholita janthinana (Duponchel, 1843)
- Grapholita molesta (Busck, 1916)
- Grapholita tenebrosana Duponchel, 1843
- Grapholita caecana Schlager, 1847
- Grapholita compositella (Fabricius, 1775)
- Grapholita coronillana Lienig & Zeller, 1846
- Grapholita fissana (Frolich, 1828)
- Grapholita gemmiferana Treitschke, 1835
- Grapholita internana (Guenee, 1845)
- Grapholita lunulana (Denis & Schiffermuller, 1775)
- Grapholita nebritana Treitschke, 1830
- Grapholita orobana Treitschke, 1830
- Gravitarmata margarotana (Heinemann, 1863)
- Gynnidomorpha alismana (Ragonot, 1883)
- Gynnidomorpha luridana (Gregson, 1870)
- Gynnidomorpha permixtana (Denis & Schiffermuller, 1775)
- Gynnidomorpha rubricana (Peyerimhoff, 1877)
- Gynnidomorpha vectisana (Humphreys & Westwood, 1845)
- Gypsonoma aceriana (Duponchel, 1843)
- Gypsonoma dealbana (Frolich, 1828)
- Gypsonoma gymnesiarum Rebel, 1934
- Gypsonoma minutana (Hübner, 1799)
- Gypsonoma oppressana (Treitschke, 1835)
- Hedya dimidiana (Clerck, 1759)
- Hedya nubiferana (Haworth, 1811)
- Hedya ochroleucana (Frolich, 1828)
- Hedya pruniana (Hübner, 1799)
- Hedya salicella (Linnaeus, 1758)
- Hysterophora maculosana (Haworth, 1811)
- Isotrias cuencana (Kennel, 1899)
- Isotrias hybridana (Hübner, 1817)
- Isotrias penedana Trematerra, 2013
- Isotrias stramentana (Guenee, 1845)
- Lathronympha balearici Diakonoff, 1972
- Lathronympha strigana (Fabricius, 1775)
- Lobesia artemisiana (Zeller, 1847)
- Lobesia bicinctana (Duponchel, 1844)
- Lobesia botrana (Denis & Schiffermuller, 1775)
- Lobesia helichrysana (Ragonot, 1879)
- Lobesia indusiana (Zeller, 1847)
- Lobesia limoniana (Milliere, 1860)
- Lobesia littoralis (Westwood & Humphreys, 1845)
- Lobesia porrectana (Zeller, 1847)
- Lobesia quaggana Mann, 1855
- Lobesia reliquana (Hübner, 1825)
- Lozotaenia cupidinana (Staudinger, 1859)
- Lozotaenia forsterana (Fabricius, 1781)
- Lozotaenia mabilliana (Ragonot, 1875)
- Lozotaeniodes cupressana (Duponchel, 1836)
- Lozotaeniodes formosana (Frolich, 1830)
- Metendothenia atropunctana (Zetterstedt, 1839)
- Neosphaleroptera nubilana (Hübner, 1799)
- Notocelia cynosbatella (Linnaeus, 1758)
- Notocelia incarnatana (Hübner, 1800)
- Notocelia roborana (Denis & Schiffermuller, 1775)
- Notocelia rosaecolana (Doubleday, 1850)
- Notocelia trimaculana (Haworth, 1811)
- Notocelia uddmanniana (Linnaeus, 1758)
- Olethreutes arcuella (Clerck, 1759)
- Olindia schumacherana (Fabricius, 1787)
- Orthotaenia undulana (Denis & Schiffermuller, 1775)
- Oxypteron exiguana (de La Harpe, 1860)
- Oxypteron polita (Walsingham, 1907)
- Oxypteron schawerdai (Rebel, 1936)
- Pammene albuginana (Guenee, 1845)
- Pammene amygdalana (Duponchel, 1842)
- Pammene argyrana (Hübner, 1799)
- Pammene aurana (Fabricius, 1775)
- Pammene cocciferana Walsingham, 1903
- Pammene fasciana (Linnaeus, 1761)
- Pammene juniperana (Milliere, 1858)
- Pammene luedersiana (Sorhagen, 1885)
- Pammene obscurana (Stephens, 1834)
- Pammene populana (Fabricius, 1787)
- Pammene salvana (Staudinger, 1859)
- Pammene spiniana (Duponchel, 1843)
- Pammene splendidulana (Guenee, 1845)
- Pammene suspectana (Lienig & Zeller, 1846)
- Pandemis cerasana (Hübner, 1786)
- Pandemis cinnamomeana (Treitschke, 1830)
- Pandemis corylana (Fabricius, 1794)
- Pandemis dumetana (Treitschke, 1835)
- Pandemis heparana (Denis & Schiffermuller, 1775)
- Paramesia alhamana (A. Schmidt, 1933)
- Paramesia gnomana (Clerck, 1759)
- Pelatea klugiana (Freyer, 1836)
- Pelochrista bleuseana (Oberthur, 1888)
- Pelochrista caecimaculana (Hübner, 1799)
- Pelochrista decolorana (Freyer, 1842)
- Pelochrista fusculana (Zeller, 1847)
- Pelochrista griseolana (Zeller, 1847)
- Pelochrista infidana (Hübner, 1824)
- Pelochrista modicana (Zeller, 1847)
- Pelochrista mollitana (Zeller, 1847)
- Pelochrista obscura Kuznetsov, 1978
- Pelochrista sordicomana (Staudinger, 1859)
- Pelochrista turiana (Zerny, 1927)
- Periclepsis cinctana (Denis & Schiffermuller, 1775)
- Phalonidia affinitana (Douglas, 1846)
- Phalonidia albipalpana (Zeller, 1847)
- Phalonidia contractana (Zeller, 1847)
- Phalonidia gilvicomana (Zeller, 1847)
- Phalonidia manniana (Fischer v. Röslerstamm, 1839)
- Phaneta pauperana (Duponchel, 1843)
- Phiaris micana (Denis & Schiffermuller, 1775)
- Phiaris predotai (Hartig, 1938)
- Phiaris umbrosana (Freyer, 1842)
- Philedone gerningana (Denis & Schiffermuller, 1775)
- Philedonides seeboldiana (Rossler, 1877)
- Phtheochroa cymatodana (Rebel, 1927)
- Phtheochroa duponchelana (Duponchel, 1843)
- Phtheochroa ecballiella Huemer, 1990
- Phtheochroa frigidana (Guenee, 1845)
- Phtheochroa gracillimana (Rebel, 1910)
- Phtheochroa inopiana (Haworth, 1811)
- Phtheochroa ochrobasana (Chretien, 1915)
- Phtheochroa rectangulana (Chretien, 1915)
- Phtheochroa rugosana (Hübner, 1799)
- Phtheochroa schreibersiana (Frolich, 1828)
- Phtheochroa simoniana (Staudinger, 1859)
- Phtheochroa syrtana Ragonot, 1888
- Piniphila bifasciana (Haworth, 1811)
- Pristerognatha fuligana (Denis & Schiffermuller, 1775)
- Propiromorpha rhodophana (Herrich-Schäffer, 1851)
- Pseudargyrotoza conwagana (Fabricius, 1775)
- Pseudococcyx mughiana (Zeller, 1868)
- Pseudococcyx posticana (Zetterstedt, 1839)
- Pseudococcyx tessulatana (Staudinger, 1871)
- Pseudococcyx turionella (Linnaeus, 1758)
- Ptycholoma lecheana (Linnaeus, 1758)
- Ptycholomoides aeriferana (Herrich-Schäffer, 1851)
- Retinia resinella (Linnaeus, 1758)
- Rhopobota naevana (Hübner, 1817)
- Rhopobota stagnana (Denis & Schiffermuller, 1775)
- Rhyacionia buoliana (Denis & Schiffermuller, 1775)
- Rhyacionia duplana (Hübner, 1813)
- Rhyacionia maritimana Prose, 1981
- Rhyacionia pinicolana (Doubleday, 1849)
- Rhyacionia pinivorana (Lienig & Zeller, 1846)
- Selania capparidana (Zeller, 1847)
- Selania leplastriana (Curtis, 1831)
- Selania resedana (Obraztsov, 1959)
- Selenodes karelica (Tengstrom, 1875)
- Sparganothis pilleriana (Denis & Schiffermuller, 1775)
- Spatalistis bifasciana (Hübner, 1787)
- Sphaleroptera alpicolana (Frolich, 1830)
- Spilonota ocellana (Denis & Schiffermuller, 1775)
- Syndemis musculana (Hübner, 1799)
- Thiodia citrana (Hübner, 1799)
- Thiodia couleruana (Duponchel, 1834)
- Thiodia lerneana (Treitschke, 1835)
- Thiodia trochilana (Frolich, 1828)
- Thiodiodes seeboldi (Rossler, 1877)
- Tortricodes alternella (Denis & Schiffermuller, 1775)
- Tortrix viridana Linnaeus, 1758
- Xerocnephasia rigana (Sodoffsky, 1829)
- Zeiraphera griseana (Hübner, 1799)
- Zeiraphera isertana (Fabricius, 1794)

== Yponomeutidae ==
- Banghaasia ildefonsella Friese, 1960
- Cedestis gysseleniella Zeller, 1839
- Cedestis subfasciella (Stephens, 1834)
- Kessleria fasciapennella (Stainton, 1849)
- Kessleria saxifragae (Stainton, 1868)
- Kessleria brachypterella Huemer & Tarmann, 1992
- Kessleria brevicornuta Huemer & Tarmann, 1992
- Kessleria diabolica Huemer & Tarmann, 1992
- Ocnerostoma friesei Svensson, 1966
- Ocnerostoma piniariella Zeller, 1847
- Paradoxus osyridellus Stainton, 1869
- Parahyponomeuta egregiella (Duponchel, 1839)
- Paraswammerdamia albicapitella (Scharfenberg, 1805)
- Paraswammerdamia nebulella (Goeze, 1783)
- Pseudoswammerdamia combinella (Hübner, 1786)
- Scythropia crataegella (Linnaeus, 1767)
- Swammerdamia caesiella (Hübner, 1796)
- Swammerdamia compunctella Herrich-Schäffer, 1855
- Swammerdamia pyrella (Villers, 1789)
- Yponomeuta cagnagella (Hübner, 1813)
- Yponomeuta evonymella (Linnaeus, 1758)
- Yponomeuta malinellus Zeller, 1838
- Yponomeuta padella (Linnaeus, 1758)
- Yponomeuta plumbella (Denis & Schiffermuller, 1775)
- Yponomeuta rorrella (Hübner, 1796)
- Yponomeuta sedella Treitschke, 1832
- Zelleria hepariella Stainton, 1849
- Zelleria oleastrella (Milliere, 1864)
- Zelleria plumbeella Staudinger, 1871

== Ypsolophidae ==
- Ochsenheimeria bubalella (Hübner, 1813)
- Ochsenheimeria taurella (Denis & Schiffermuller, 1775)
- Ochsenheimeria vacculella Fischer von Röslerstamm, 1842
- Phrealcia eximiella (Rebel, 1899)
- Ypsolopha asperella (Linnaeus, 1761)
- Ypsolopha blandella (Christoph, 1882)
- Ypsolopha cajaliella Vives, 2003
- Ypsolopha dentella (Fabricius, 1775)
- Ypsolopha excisella (Lederer, 1855)
- Ypsolopha fractella (Chretien, 1915)
- Ypsolopha horridella (Treitschke, 1835)
- Ypsolopha instabilella (Mann, 1866)
- Ypsolopha lucella (Fabricius, 1775)
- Ypsolopha mucronella (Scopoli, 1763)
- Ypsolopha nemorella (Linnaeus, 1758)
- Ypsolopha parenthesella (Linnaeus, 1761)
- Ypsolopha persicella (Fabricius, 1787)
- Ypsolopha scabrella (Linnaeus, 1761)
- Ypsolopha sequella (Clerck, 1759)
- Ypsolopha sylvella (Linnaeus, 1767)
- Ypsolopha trichonella (Mann, 1861)
- Ypsolopha ustella (Clerck, 1759)
- Ypsolopha vittella (Linnaeus, 1758)

== Zygaenidae ==
- Adscita geryon (Hübner, 1813)
- Adscita jordani (Naufock, 1921)
- Adscita schmidti (Naufock, 1933)
- Adscita statices (Linnaeus, 1758)
- Adscita bolivari (Agenjo, 1937)
- Adscita mannii (Lederer, 1853)
- Aglaope infausta (Linnaeus, 1767)
- Jordanita hispanica (Alberti, 1937)
- Jordanita globulariae (Hübner, 1793)
- Jordanita vartianae (Malicky, 1961)
- Jordanita subsolana (Staudinger, 1862)
- Jordanita budensis (Ad. & Au. Speyer, 1858)
- Jordanita notata (Zeller, 1847)
- Rhagades pruni (Denis & Schiffermuller, 1775)
- Rhagades predotae (Naufock, 1930)
- Zygaena carniolica (Scopoli, 1763)
- Zygaena fausta (Linnaeus, 1767)
- Zygaena hilaris Ochsenheimer, 1808
- Zygaena occitanica (Villers, 1789)
- Zygaena contaminei Boisduval, 1834
- Zygaena purpuralis (Brunnich, 1763)
- Zygaena sarpedon (Hübner, 1790)
- Zygaena anthyllidis Boisduval, 1828
- Zygaena ephialtes (Linnaeus, 1767)
- Zygaena exulans (Hohenwarth, 1792)
- Zygaena filipendulae (Linnaeus, 1758)
- Zygaena ignifera Korb, 1897
- Zygaena lavandulae (Esper, 1783)
- Zygaena lonicerae (Scheven, 1777)
- Zygaena loti (Denis & Schiffermuller, 1775)
- Zygaena nevadensis Rambur, 1858
- Zygaena osterodensis Reiss, 1921
- Zygaena rhadamanthus (Esper, 1789)
- Zygaena romeo Duponchel, 1835
- Zygaena transalpina (Esper, 1780)
- Zygaena trifolii (Esper, 1783)
- Zygaena viciae (Denis & Schiffermuller, 1775)

== See also ==
- List of Iberian butterflies
