= Enolmis amseli =

Scientific classification
- Domain: Eukaryota
- Kingdom: Animalia
- Phylum: Arthropoda
- Class: Insecta
- Order: Lepidoptera
- Family: Scythrididae
- Genus: Enolmis
- Species: E. amseli

Binomial name
- Enolmis amseli Passerin d'Entrèves, 1997

Species of moth

Enolmis amseli is a moth of the family Scythrididae. It was described by Pietro Passerin d'Entrèves in 1997. It is found in Morocco.
