= Enolmis agenjoi =

Scientific classification
- Domain: Eukaryota
- Kingdom: Animalia
- Phylum: Arthropoda
- Class: Insecta
- Order: Lepidoptera
- Family: Scythrididae
- Genus: Enolmis
- Species: E. agenjoi

Binomial name
- Enolmis agenjoi Passerin d'Entrèves, 1988

Species of moth

Enolmis agenjoi is a moth of the family Scythrididae. It was described by Passerin d'Entrèves in 1988. It is found in Italy and France.
