= Enolmis saudita =

Scientific classification
- Domain: Eukaryota
- Kingdom: Animalia
- Phylum: Arthropoda
- Class: Insecta
- Order: Lepidoptera
- Family: Scythrididae
- Genus: Enolmis
- Species: E. saudita

Binomial name
- Enolmis saudita Passerin d'Entrèves, 1986

Synonyms
- Enolmis desidella saudita Passerin d'Entrèves, 1986

Species of moth

Enolmis saudita is a moth of the family Scythrididae. It was described by Pietro Passerin d'Entrèves in 1986. It is found in south-western Saudi Arabia and Yemen.
