= Enolmis tunisiae =

Scientific classification
- Kingdom: Animalia
- Phylum: Arthropoda
- Clade: Pancrustacea
- Class: Insecta
- Order: Lepidoptera
- Family: Scythrididae
- Genus: Enolmis
- Species: E. tunisiae

Binomial name
- Enolmis tunisiae Bengtsson, 2005

Species of moth

Enolmis tunisiae is a moth of the family Scythrididae. It was described by Bengt Å. Bengtsson in 2005. It is found in Tunisia.
