= Enolmis arabica =

Scientific classification
- Domain: Eukaryota
- Kingdom: Animalia
- Phylum: Arthropoda
- Class: Insecta
- Order: Lepidoptera
- Family: Scythrididae
- Genus: Enolmis
- Species: E. arabica

Binomial name
- Enolmis arabica Passerin d'Entrèves, 1986

Synonyms
- Enolmis jemenensis Bengtsson, 2002

Species of moth

Enolmis arabica is a moth of the family Scythrididae. It was described by Passerin d'Entrèves in 1986. It is found in Saudi Arabia and Yemen.
