= Enolmis gigantella =

Scientific classification
- Domain: Eukaryota
- Kingdom: Animalia
- Phylum: Arthropoda
- Class: Insecta
- Order: Lepidoptera
- Family: Scythrididae
- Genus: Enolmis
- Species: E. gigantella

Binomial name
- Enolmis gigantella (Lucas, 1942)

Synonyms
- Scythris acanthella var. gigantella Lucas, 1942

Species of moth

Enolmis gigantella is a moth of the family Scythrididae. It was described by Daniel Lucas in 1942. It is found in Morocco.
