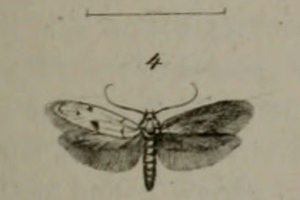

Scientific classification
- Domain: Eukaryota
- Kingdom: Animalia
- Phylum: Arthropoda
- Class: Insecta
- Order: Lepidoptera
- Family: Scythrididae
- Genus: Enolmis
- Species: E. desidella

Binomial name
- Enolmis desidella (Lederer, 1855)

Synonyms
- Butalis desidella Lederer, 1855

= Enolmis desidella =

Species of moth

Enolmis desidella is a moth of the family Scythrididae. It was described by Julius Lederer in 1855. It is found in Saudi Arabia, Syria, Lebanon, Turkey, Libya, Mauritania, Crete, Cyprus and Croatia, Slovenia, Serbia, Bosnia and Herzegovina, North Macedonia and Greece.
