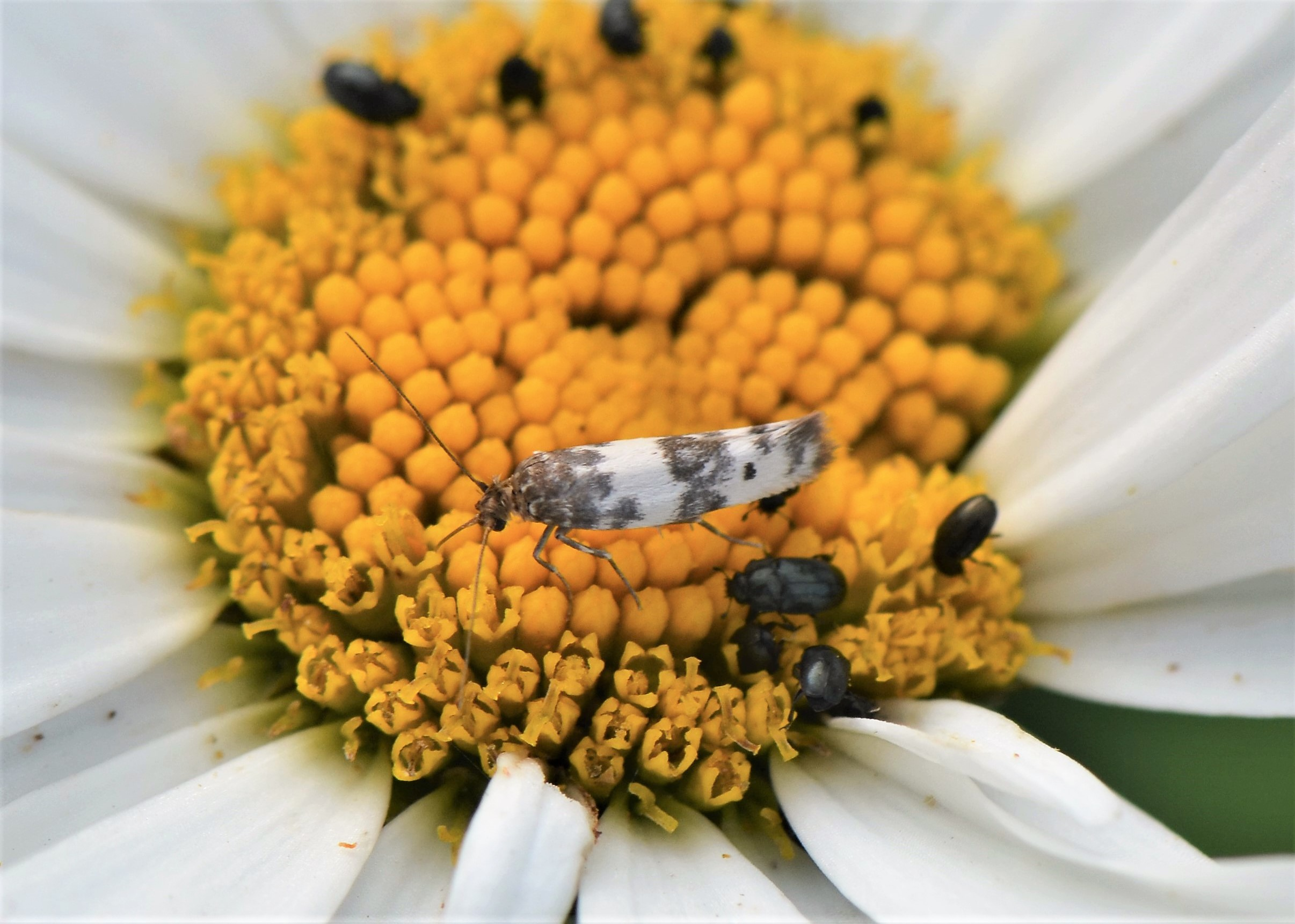
- Enolmis acanthella

Scientific classification
- Domain: Eukaryota
- Kingdom: Animalia
- Phylum: Arthropoda
- Class: Insecta
- Order: Lepidoptera
- Family: Scythrididae
- Genus: Enolmis; Duponchel, 1845

Synonyms
- Bryophaga Ragonot, 1875

= Enolmis =

Genus of moths

Enolmis is a genus of moths in the family Scythrididae.

== Species ==
Some species of this genus are:

- Enolmis abenhumeya (Agenjo, 1951) (from Spain)
- Enolmis acanthella (Godart, 1824) (Mediterranean)
- Enolmis agenjoi Passerin d'Entrèves, 1988 (from Southern Europe)
- Enolmis amseli Passerin d'Entrèves, 1997 (from Morocco)
- Enolmis arabica Passerin d'Entrèves, 1986
- Enolmis bimerdella (Staudinger, 1859) (from Spain)
- Enolmis delicatella (Rebel, 1901) (Iberian peninsula)
- Enolmis delnoydella Groenen & Schreurs, 2016
- Enolmis desidella (Lederer, 1855) (Mediterranean)
- Enolmis gigantella (Lucas, 1942) (from Morocco)
- Enolmis nevadensis Passerin d'Entrèves, 1997 (from Spain)
- Enolmis saudita Passerin d'Entrèves, 1986
- Enolmis seeboldiella (Agenjo, 1951) (from Spain)
- Enolmis sierraenevadae Passerin d'Entrèves, 1997 (from Spain)
- Enolmis tunisiae Bengtsson, 2005
- Enolmis userai Agenjo, 1962 (from Spain)
- Enolmis vivesi Bengtsson & Passerin d'Entrèves, 1988 (from Spain)

== Former species ==
- Enolmis jemenensis Bengtsson, 2002
