= Niethammeriodes =

Scientific classification
- Domain: Eukaryota
- Kingdom: Animalia
- Phylum: Arthropoda
- Class: Insecta
- Order: Lepidoptera
- Family: Pyralidae
- Tribe: Phycitini
- Genus: Niethammeriodes; Roesler, 1969

Genus of moths

Niethammeriodes is a genus of moths of the family Pyralidae. The genus name is in honor of Günther Niethammer.

== Species ==
- Niethammeriodes diremptella (Ragonot, 1887)
- Niethammeriodes ustella (Ragonot, 1887)
