= Praeepischnia =

Scientific classification
- Domain: Eukaryota
- Kingdom: Animalia
- Phylum: Arthropoda
- Class: Insecta
- Order: Lepidoptera
- Family: Pyralidae
- Tribe: Phycitini
- Genus: Praeepischnia; Amsel, 1954

Genus of moths

Praeepischnia is a genus of snout moths.

== Species ==
- Praeepischnia lydella (Lederer, 1865)
- Praeepischnia nevadensis (Rebel, 1910)
- Praeepischnia taftanella Amsel, 1954
