= Praeepischnia nevadensis =

Scientific classification
- Domain: Eukaryota
- Kingdom: Animalia
- Phylum: Arthropoda
- Class: Insecta
- Order: Lepidoptera
- Family: Pyralidae
- Genus: Praeepischnia
- Species: P. nevadensis

Binomial name
- Praeepischnia nevadensis (Rebel, 1910)

Synonyms
- Epischnia nevadensis Rebel, 1910

Species of moth

Praeepischnia nevadensis is a species of snout moth. It is found in Spain.

The length of the forewings is 11.5–13 mm.
