= Scythris lobella =

Scientific classification
- Kingdom: Animalia
- Phylum: Arthropoda
- Clade: Pancrustacea
- Class: Insecta
- Order: Lepidoptera
- Family: Scythrididae
- Genus: Scythris
- Species: S. lobella

Binomial name
- Scythris lobella K. Nupponen, 2013

Species of moth

Scythris lobella is a moth of the family Scythrididae. It was described by K. Nupponen in 2013. It is found in southern Spain. The habitat consists of xerotermic slopes with sparse vegetation.
