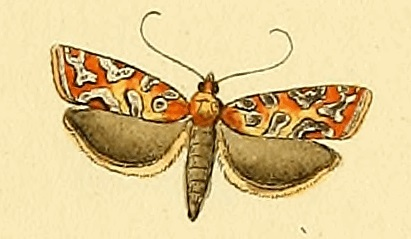

Scientific classification
- Domain: Eukaryota
- Kingdom: Animalia
- Phylum: Arthropoda
- Class: Insecta
- Order: Lepidoptera
- Family: Tortricidae
- Genus: Aneuxanthis
- Species: A. locupletana

Binomial name
- Aneuxanthis locupletana (Hubner, [1822])

Synonyms
- Tortrix locupletana Hubner, [1822]

= Aneuxanthis locupletana =

Species of moth

Aneuxanthis locupletana is a species of moth of the family Tortricidae. It is found in Portugal, Spain, France, Italy and on Corsica, Sardinia and Sicily.

The wingspan is 20–22 mm. Adults are on wing from June to July.
