= Enolmis abenhumeya =

Scientific classification
- Domain: Eukaryota
- Kingdom: Animalia
- Phylum: Arthropoda
- Class: Insecta
- Order: Lepidoptera
- Family: Scythrididae
- Genus: Enolmis
- Species: E. abenhumeya

Binomial name
- Enolmis abenhumeya (Agenjo, 1951)

Synonyms
- Bryophaga abenhumeya Agenjo, 1951

Species of moth

Enolmis abenhumeya is a moth of the family Scythrididae. It was described by Ramón Agenjo Cecilia in 1951. It is found in Spain.
