= Scythris corleyi =

Scientific classification
- Kingdom: Animalia
- Phylum: Arthropoda
- Clade: Pancrustacea
- Class: Insecta
- Order: Lepidoptera
- Family: Scythrididae
- Genus: Scythris
- Species: S. corleyi

Binomial name
- Scythris corleyi Bengtsson, 1997

Species of moth

Scythris corleyi is a moth of the family Scythrididae. It was described by Bengt Å. Bengtsson in 1997. It is found in Spain (Andalusia) and Portugal.

== Etymology ==
The species is named in honour of the collector of most of the type series, Mr. Martin Corley.
