= Enolmis delnoydella =

Scientific classification
- Domain: Eukaryota
- Kingdom: Animalia
- Phylum: Arthropoda
- Class: Insecta
- Order: Lepidoptera
- Family: Scythrididae
- Genus: Enolmis
- Species: E. delnoydella

Binomial name
- Enolmis delnoydella Groenen & Schreurs, 2016

Species of moth

Enolmis delnoydella is a moth of the family Scythrididae. It was described by Groenen and Schreurs in 2016. It is found in Spain (Almeria). The wingspan is 12–13 mm (0.47–0.51 in).
