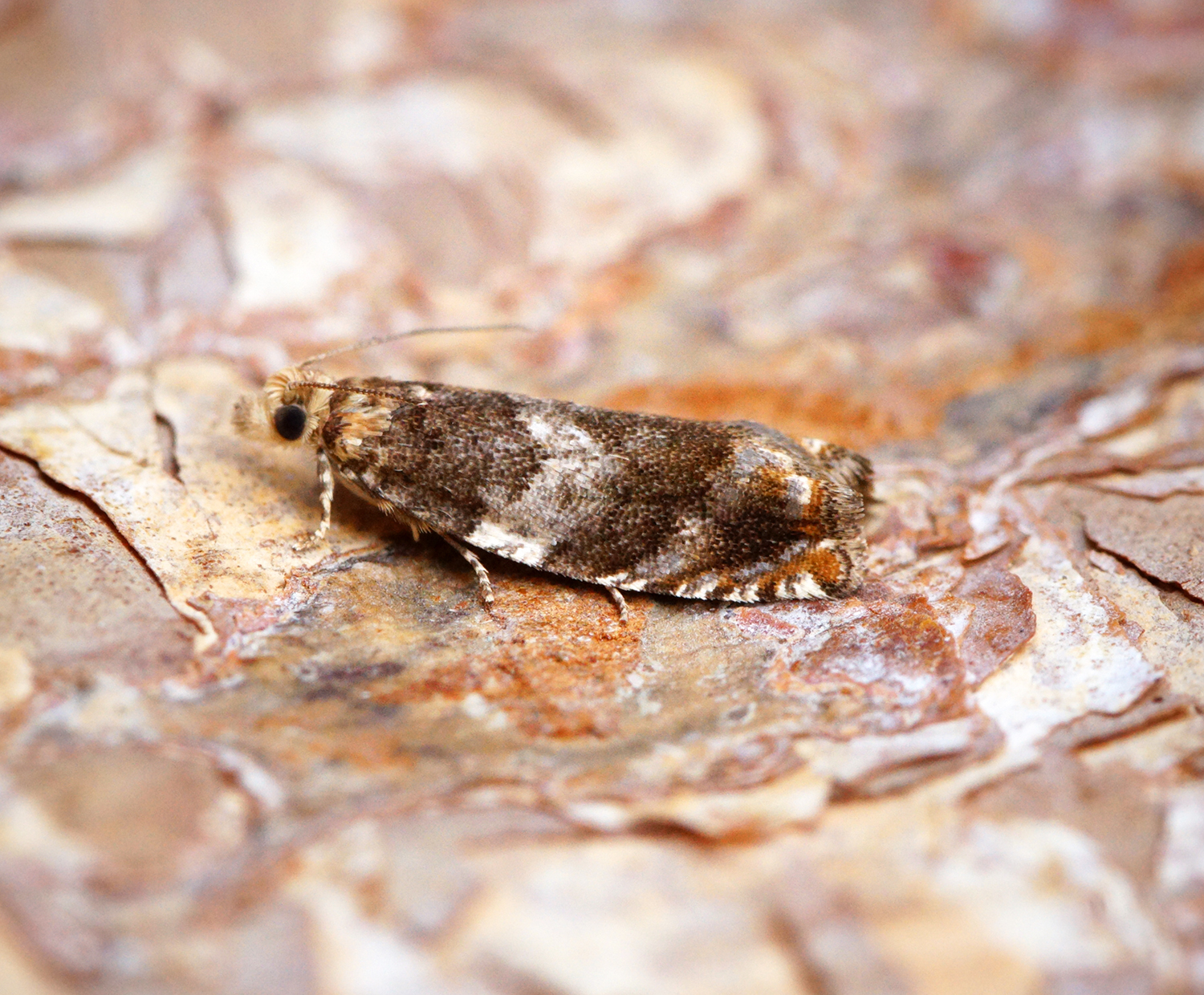

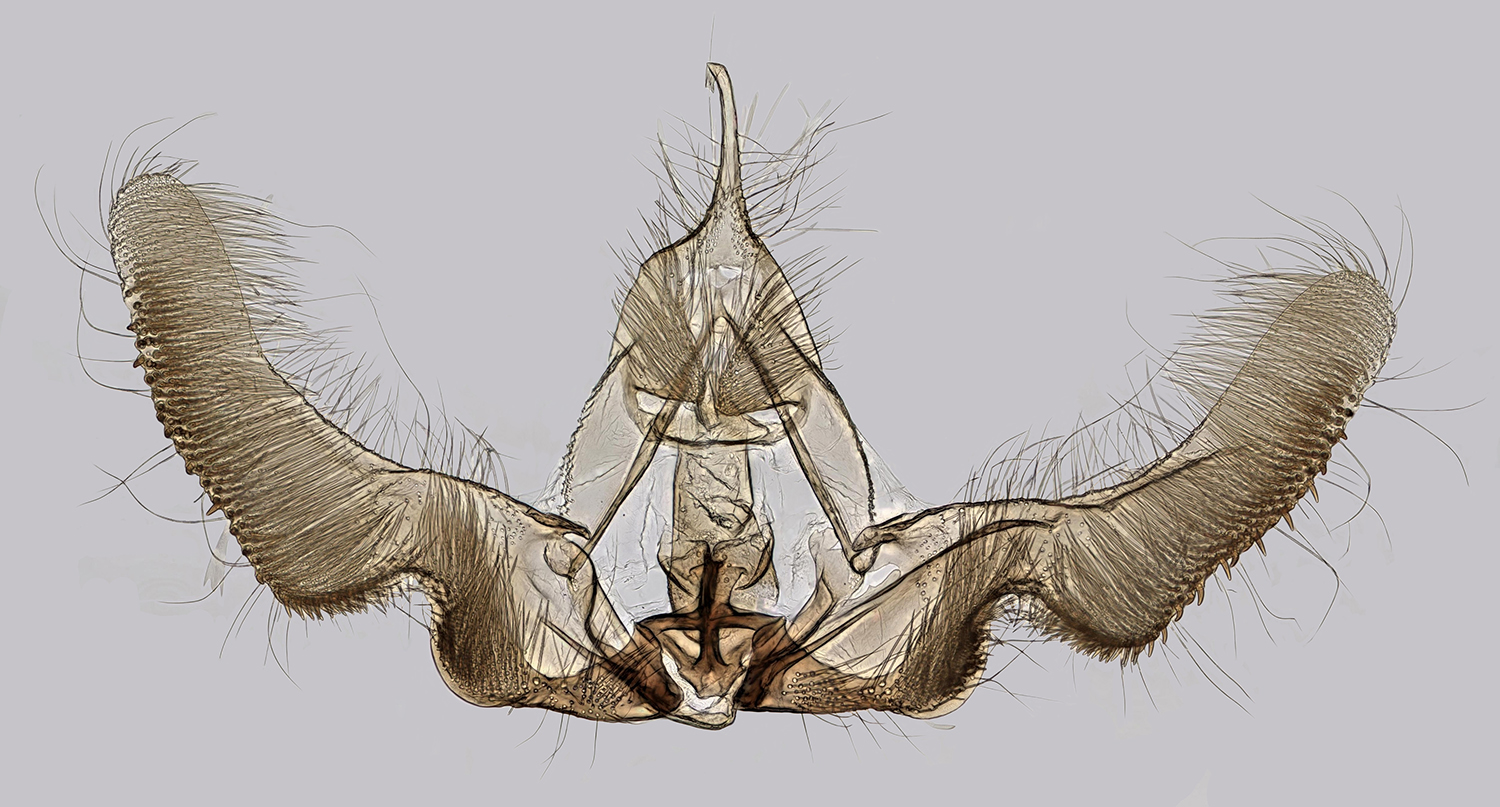
- Male genitalia

Scientific classification
- Kingdom: Animalia
- Phylum: Arthropoda
- Class: Insecta
- Order: Lepidoptera
- Family: Tortricidae
- Genus: Epinotia
- Species: E. abbreviana

Binomial name
- Epinotia abbreviana (Fabricius, 1794)

Synonyms
- Pyralis abbreviana Fabricius, 1794; Epinotia trimaculana Donovan, 1806

= Epinotia abbreviana =

Species of moth

Epinotia abbreviana is a moth of the family Tortricidae. It is found in Europe and was first described by Johan Christian Fabricius in 1794.

== Description ==
The wingspan is 13-15 mm. The palpi are whitish, grey towards the tips. The forewings vary from white to ochreous, sometimes with dark fuscous strigulae. The costa has dark fuscous and pale or white strigulae. The edge of the basal patch is angulated in the middle. The central fascia is dilated dorsally, and there is an irregular spot before the termen in middle. This is usually more or less ochreous and much striated or suffused with dark fuscous, in ochreous specimens it is sometimes obsolete. The apical area is ochreous. The margins of the ocellus and sometimes two streaks from the costa are posteriorly leaden-metallic. The hindwings are grey. The larva is pale greenish or yellowish, more brownish above; head and plate of 2 black.

== Life cycle ==
The moth can be found in June and July flying at dusk and night. During the day it can be found on the trunks or foliage of elm (Ulmus species). It occasionally comes to light.

=== Larvae ===
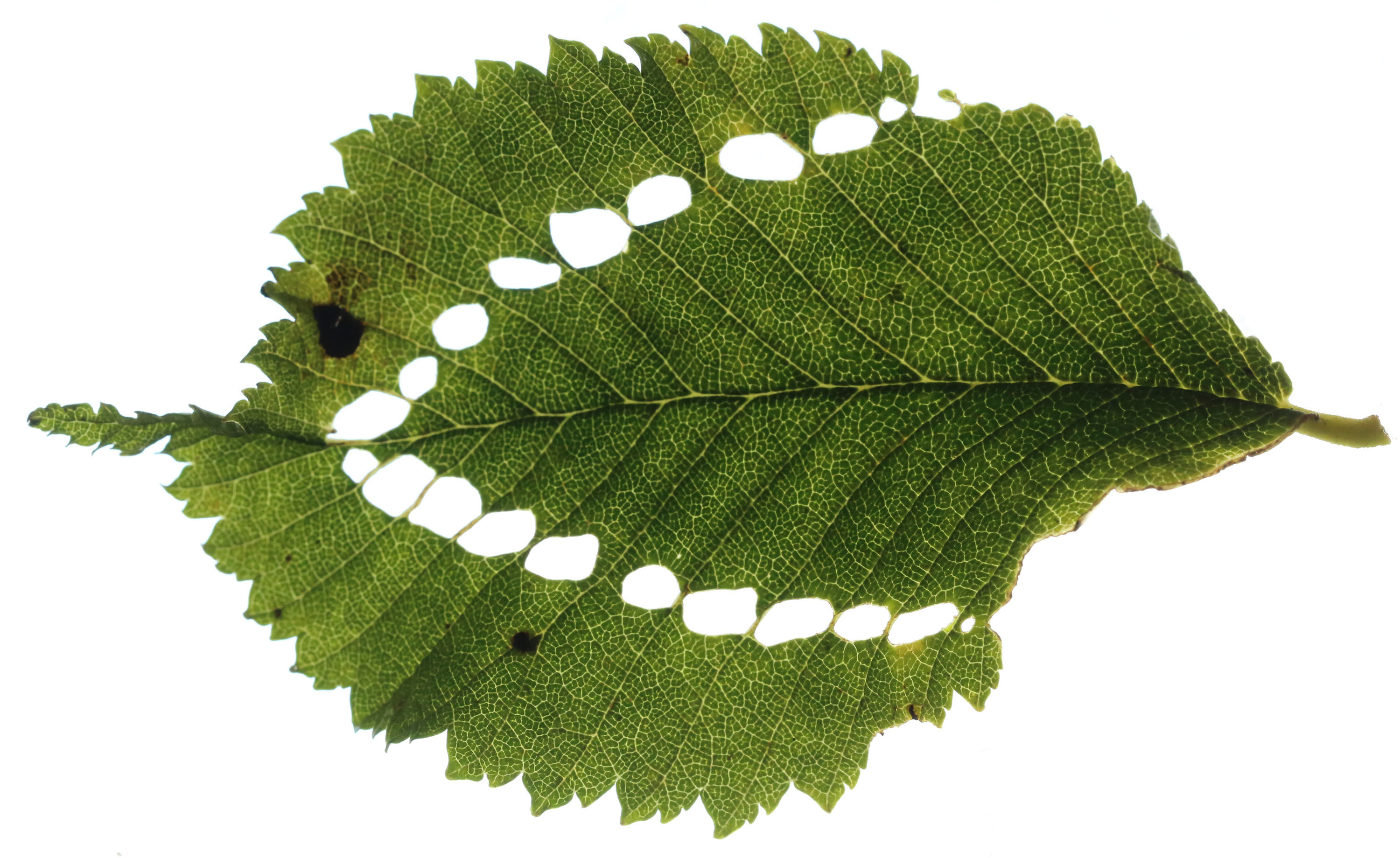
Feeding pattern of early instar

Larvae can be found from April to June, with early instars initially feeding within a developing bud, perforating the leaf. As the bud opens, the leaf expands to show the distinctive feeding pattern. Later they feed in a spinning on another leaf. Field maple (Acer campestre) is also eaten and larvae have been found on greater stitchwort (Stellaria holostea), which indicates it will eat herbaceous plants if dislodged from its normal feeding place on elm.

=== Pupa ===
The pale yellowish-brown pupa are spun in a silken cocoon, on the ground amongst leaf litter.

== Distribution ==
This moth is found all over Europe from Ireland to Russia.
