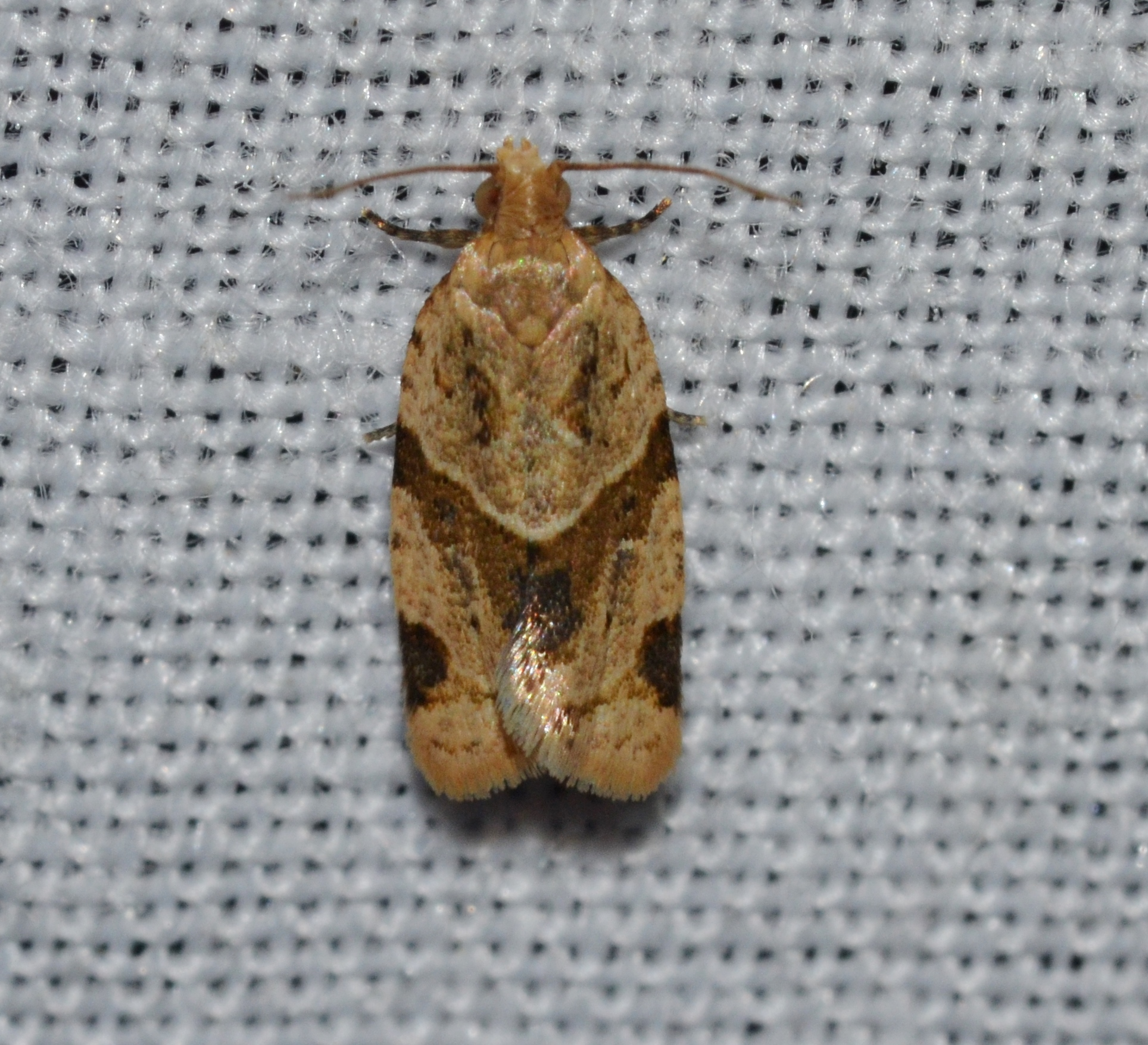

Scientific classification
- Kingdom: Animalia
- Phylum: Arthropoda
- Clade: Pancrustacea
- Class: Insecta
- Order: Lepidoptera
- Family: Tortricidae
- Genus: Clepsis
- Species: C. peritana

Binomial name
- Clepsis peritana (Clemens, 1860)

Synonyms
- Smicrotes peritana Clemens, 1860; Dichelia inconclusana Walker, 1863

= Clepsis peritana =

Species of moth

Clepsis peritana, the garden tortrix or strawberry garden tortrix, is a species of moth of the family Tortricidae. It is found in Spain, Cuba, as well as North America, where it has been recorded from southern Canada throughout the United States.

The wingspan is 10–15 mm for males and 12–15 mm for females. Adults have been recorded on wing from March to September, in several generations per year.

The larvae feed on Chrysanthemum, Cynara cardunculus, Senecio jacobaea, Stachys, Fragaria, Citrus, Scrophularia californica and Solanum torvum. Full-grown larvae reach a length of 13–14 mm. They have a light green abdomen, but the body colour can vary depending on the host plant. The head is yellowish brown.
