= Enolmis seeboldiella =

Scientific classification
- Domain: Eukaryota
- Kingdom: Animalia
- Phylum: Arthropoda
- Class: Insecta
- Order: Lepidoptera
- Family: Scythrididae
- Genus: Enolmis
- Species: E. seeboldiella

Binomial name
- Enolmis seeboldiella (Agenjo, 1951)

Synonyms
- Bryophaga acanthella seeboldiella Agenjo, 1951

Species of moth

Enolmis seeboldiella is a moth of the family Scythrididae. It was described by Ramon Agenjo Cecilia in 1951. It is found in Spain.
