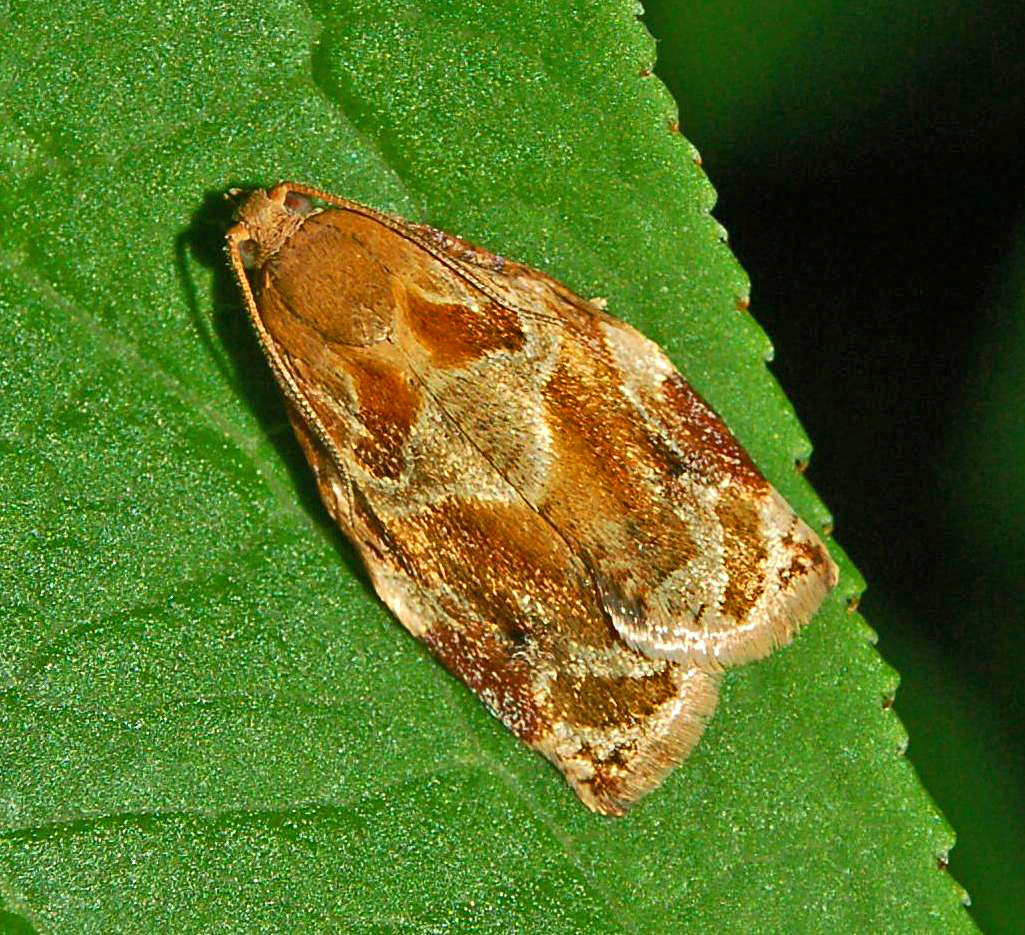

Scientific classification
- Kingdom: Animalia
- Phylum: Arthropoda
- Clade: Pancrustacea
- Class: Insecta
- Order: Lepidoptera
- Family: Tortricidae
- Genus: Archips
- Species: A. xylosteana

Binomial name
- Archips xylosteana (Linnaeus, 1758)

Synonyms
- List: Archips westriniana; Archips characterana; Phalaena (Tortrix) xylosteana Linnaeus, 1758; Phalaena (Tortrix) characterana Hubner, 1793; Phalaena (Tortrix) densana Villers, 1789; Phalaena densata Fourcroy, 1785; Tortrix gilvana Eversmann, 1842; Pyralis hybnerana Fabricius, 1794; Pyralis obliquana Fabricius, 1781; Cacoecia xylosteana var. pallens Kennel, 1910; Archips xylosteana sabrinae Leraut & Luquet, 1996; Tortrix westriniana Thunberg & Borgstrom, 1784

= Archips xylosteana =

Species of moth

Archips xylosteana, the variegated golden tortrix or brown oak tortrix, is a moth of the family Tortricidae.

== Distribution ==
This Palearctic moth is widespread in most of Europe, in Asia (China, Iran, Japan, Kazakhstan, Korea, Siberia, Turkey), and in northern Africa (Algeria).

== Habitat ==
This moth species inhabit woodland and scrub in hilly and mountainous areas.

== Description ==
Archips xylosteana is a medium-sized to large moth with a wingspan reaching 14–23 millimetres (0.55–0.91 in). The females are usually slightly larger than the males. The basic color of the fore wings varies from yellow-brown or ocher to pinkish brown, mottled with dark reddish brown markings. Forewings are broad and roughly rectangular. Hind wings are light grayish brown. The design of the wings may appear lightly asymmetric, because at rest one of the wing covers the other and hides part of it. The caterpillar varies from whitish gray to bluish with greenish reflections and have a black head. Meyrick describes it - Forewings with termen sinuate, vertical, costal fold from base to 3/5, irregular; ochreous more or less fuscous-tinged, paler towards costa; a transverse dorsal spot near base, central fascia with anterior edge sinuate, costal patch broadly connected with it near costa, a blotch from above tornus sometimes connected with costal patch, and an apical spot dark ferruginous-brown. Hindwings grey, apex sometimes yellowish-tinged. Larva whitish-grey or pale greenish; head black;plate of 2 black, anterior edge white. Julius von Kennel provides a full description.

== Biology ==
These moths fly from June to August in one generation. They rest during the day in the foliage of trees and shrubs. Their activity begins at dusk. They overwinter on tree trunks and thick boughs.

Caterpillars grow protected in a rolled leaf, perpendicularly to the midrib, from April to June. These larvae are polyphagous, feeding on various shrubs and deciduous trees, mainly oak (Quercus), elm (Ulmus), linden (Tilia), hazel (Corylus), maples (Acer), ash (Fraxinus, firs (Abies), brambles (Rubus), honeysuckle (Lonicera) and St John's worts (Hypericum)). They can also be found on various fruit trees (apple, pear, etc.) and on some herbaceous plants.

== Gallery ==
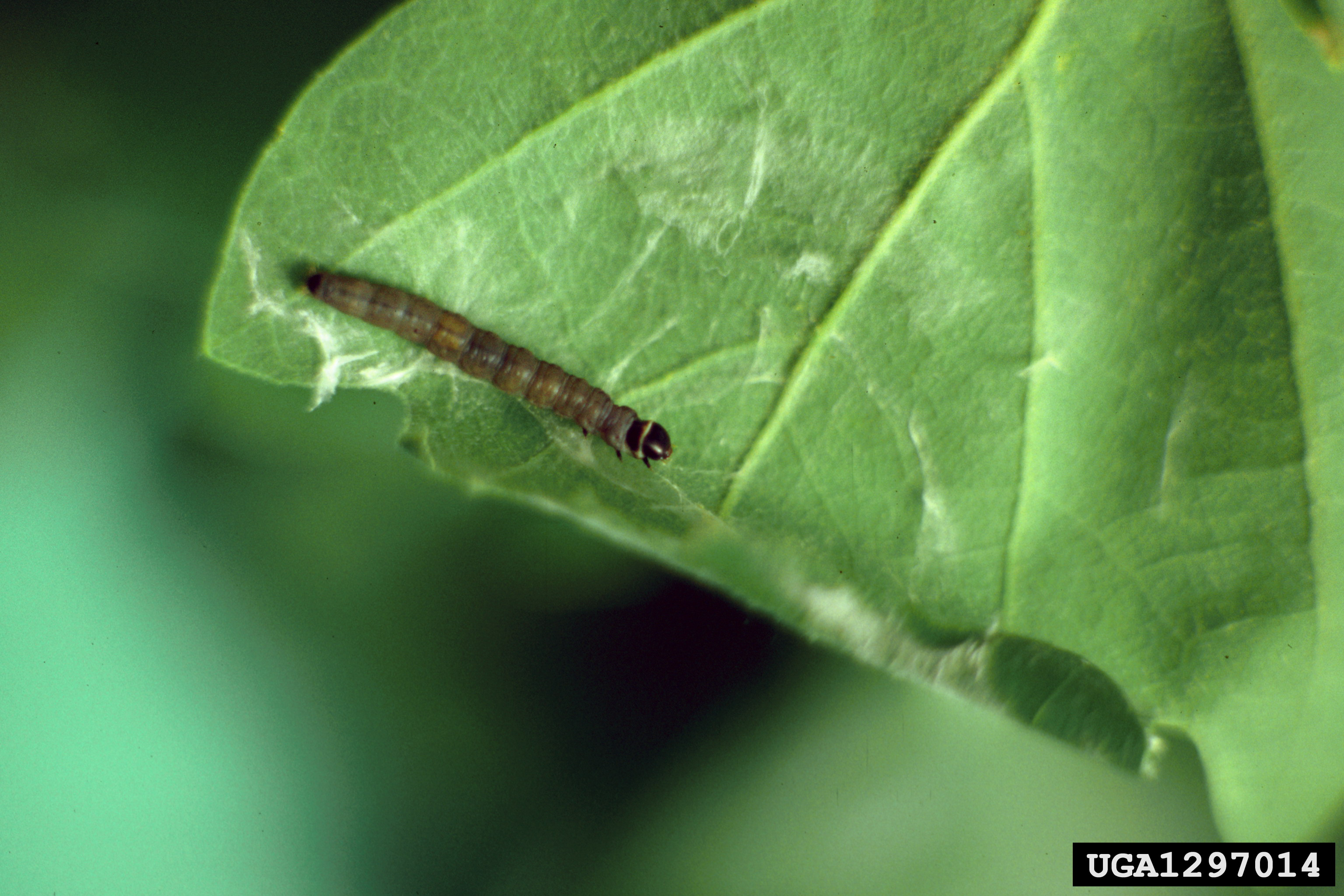
Caterpillar

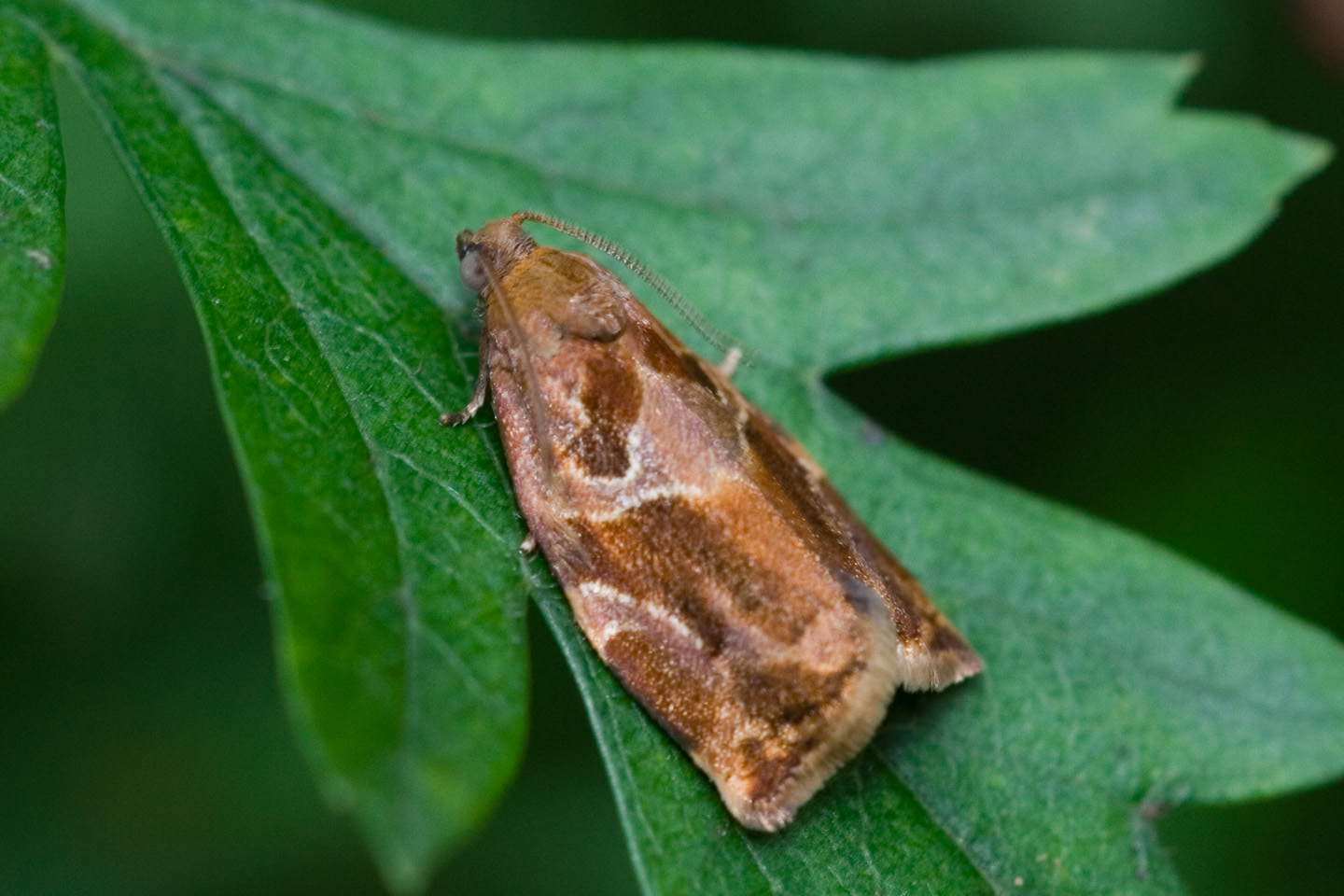
Moth, side view

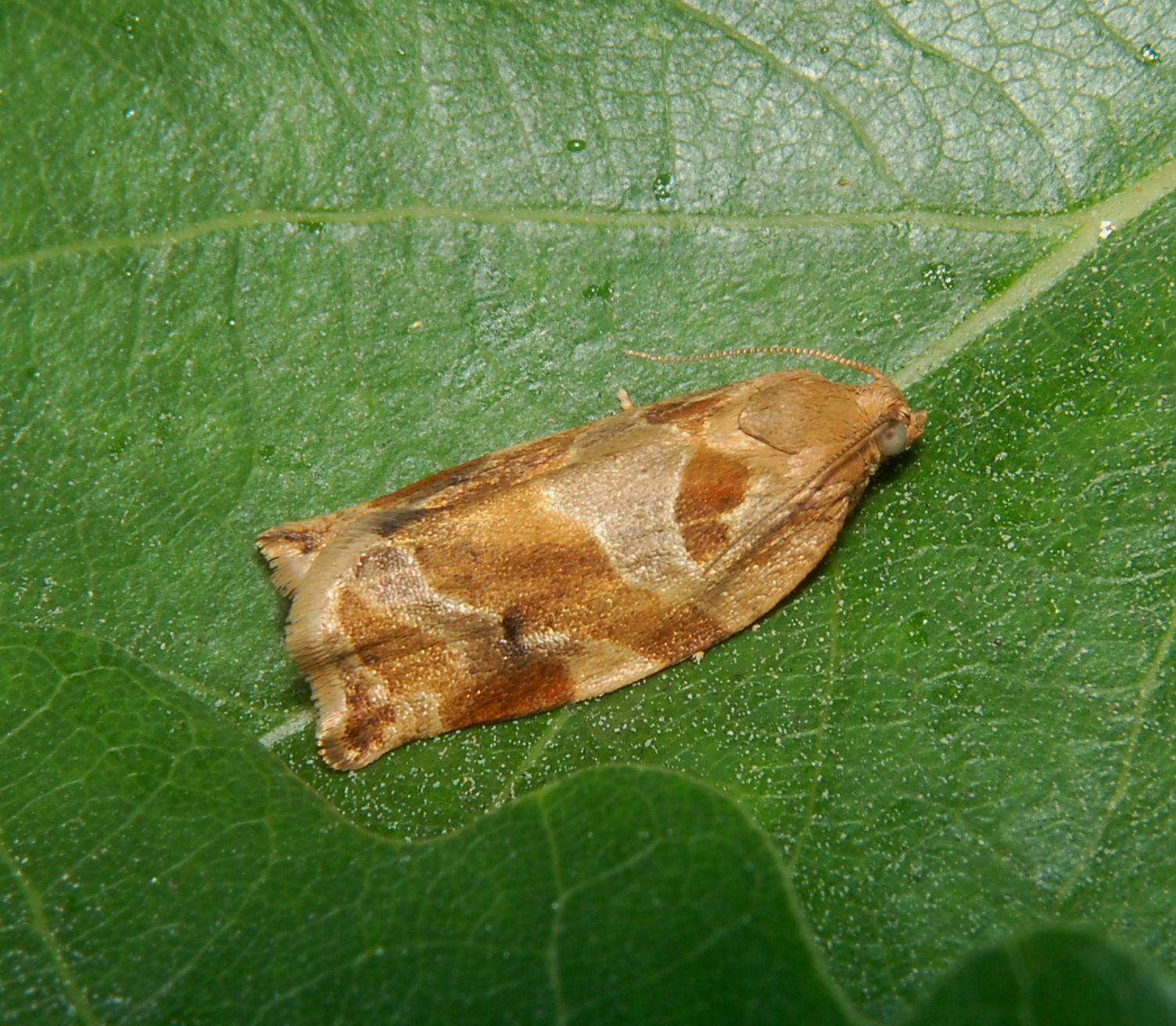
Moth, female

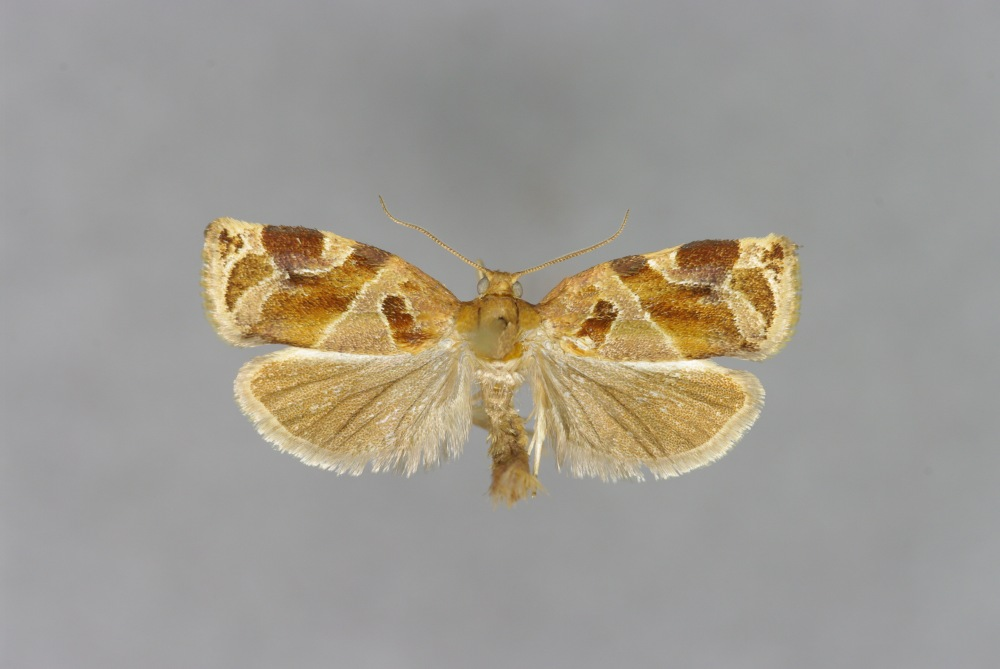
Mounted specimen. Male

== Bibliography ==
- Linnaeus, C. (1758): Systema naturae per regna tria naturae, secundum classes, ordines, genera, species, cum characteribus, differentiis, synonymis, locis. Tomus I. Editio decima, reformata. 1-824. Holmiae (Laurentius Salvius).
- Robinson, G. S. & E. Schmidt Nielsen (1983): The Microlepidoptera described by Linnaeus and Clerck. — Systematic Entomology 8: 191-242.
