= Scythris popescugorji =

Scientific classification
- Kingdom: Animalia
- Phylum: Arthropoda
- Class: Insecta
- Order: Lepidoptera
- Family: Scythrididae
- Genus: Scythris
- Species: S. popescugorji

Binomial name
- Scythris popescugorji Passerin d’Entrèves, 1984

Species of moth

Scythris popescugorji is a moth of the family Scythrididae. It was described by Passerin d’Entrèves in 1984. It is found in Portugal and Turkey, where it usually occurs in mountainous regions.
