= Enolmis userai =

Scientific classification
- Domain: Eukaryota
- Kingdom: Animalia
- Phylum: Arthropoda
- Class: Insecta
- Order: Lepidoptera
- Family: Scythrididae
- Genus: Enolmis
- Species: E. userai

Binomial name
- Enolmis userai (Agenjo, 1962)

Synonyms
- Bryophaga userai Agenjo, 1962

Species of moth

Enolmis userai is a moth of the family Scythrididae. It was described by Ramón Agenjo Cecilia in 1962. It is found in Spain.
