= Niethammeriodes ustella =

Scientific classification
- Domain: Eukaryota
- Kingdom: Animalia
- Phylum: Arthropoda
- Class: Insecta
- Order: Lepidoptera
- Family: Pyralidae
- Genus: Niethammeriodes
- Species: N. ustella

Binomial name
- Niethammeriodes ustella (Ragonot, 1887)

Synonyms
- Ancylosis ustella Ragonot, 1887

Species of moth

Niethammeriodes ustella is a species of snout moth described by Émile Louis Ragonot in 1887. It is found in Spain and North Africa, including Algeria.

The wingspan is about 18 mm.
