= Niethammeriodes diremptella =

Scientific classification
- Domain: Eukaryota
- Kingdom: Animalia
- Phylum: Arthropoda
- Class: Insecta
- Order: Lepidoptera
- Family: Pyralidae
- Genus: Niethammeriodes
- Species: N. diremptella

Binomial name
- Niethammeriodes diremptella (Ragonot, 1887)

Synonyms
- Ancylosis diremptella Ragonot, 1887

Species of moth

Niethammeriodes diremptella is a species of snout moth described by Émile Louis Ragonot in 1887. It is found in Spain and belongs to the family Pyralidae, order Lepidoptera, and class Insecta. It is a part of the genus Niethammeriodes, which is named in honor of Günther Niethammer.
