= Enolmis vivesi =

Scientific classification
- Kingdom: Animalia
- Phylum: Arthropoda
- Clade: Pancrustacea
- Class: Insecta
- Order: Lepidoptera
- Family: Scythrididae
- Genus: Enolmis
- Species: E. vivesi

Binomial name
- Enolmis vivesi Bengtsson & Passerin d'Entrèves, 1988

Species of moth

Enolmis vivesi is a moth of the family Scythrididae. It was described by Bengt Å. Bengtsson and Pietro Passerin d'Entrèves in 1988. It is found in Spain.

== Etymology ==
The species is named in honour of Dr. A. Vives, Madrid, who provided much of the type material.
