= Scythris latilineella =

Scientific classification
- Kingdom: Animalia
- Phylum: Arthropoda
- Clade: Pancrustacea
- Class: Insecta
- Order: Lepidoptera
- Family: Scythrididae
- Genus: Scythris
- Species: S. latilineella

Binomial name
- Scythris latilineella K. Nupponen, 2013

Species of moth

Scythris latilineella is a moth of the family Scythrididae. It was described by K. Nupponen in 2013. It is found in central Spain. The habitat consists of xerotermic rocky slopes with sparse vegetation.

The wingspan is 9.5-11.5 mm.
