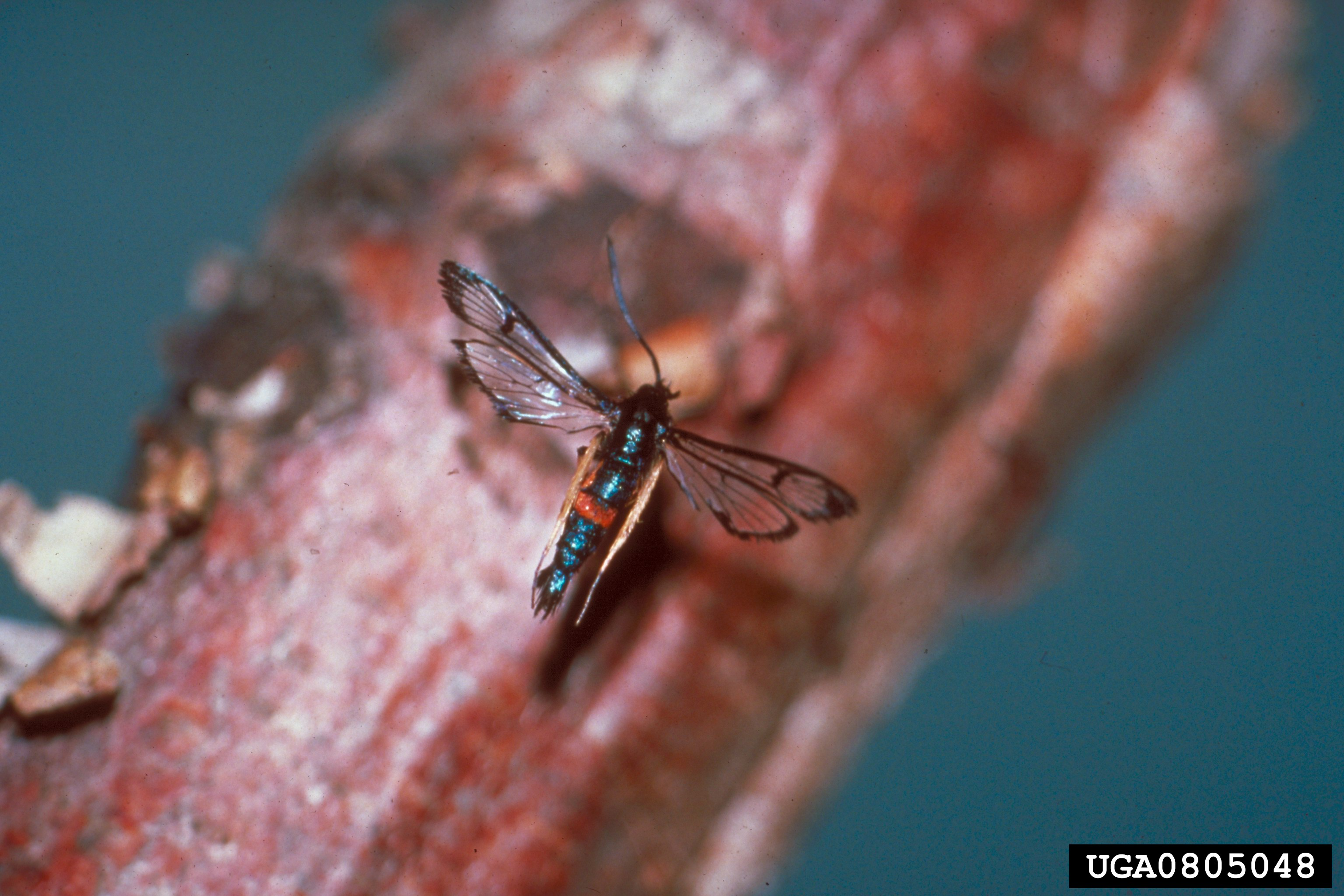

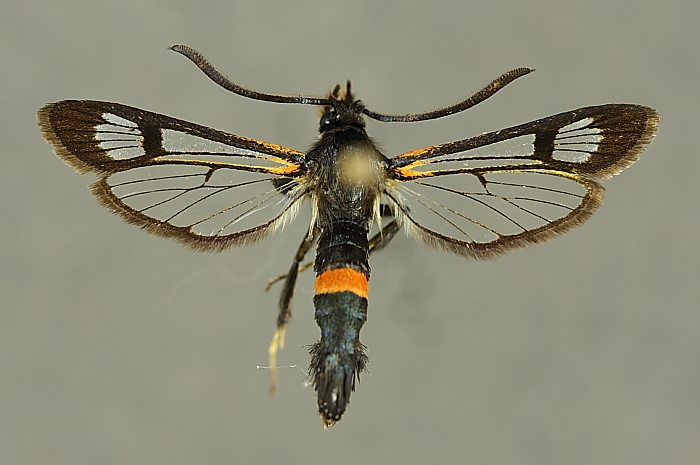

Scientific classification
- Kingdom: Animalia
- Phylum: Arthropoda
- Clade: Pancrustacea
- Class: Insecta
- Order: Lepidoptera
- Family: Sesiidae
- Genus: Synanthedon
- Species: S. culiciformis

Binomial name
- Synanthedon culiciformis (Linnaeus, 1758)

Synonyms
- Sphinx culiciformis Linnaeus, 1758; Sphinx culex Retzius, 1783; Sesia culiciformis var. americana Beutenmüller, 1896; Aegeria lutescens Mosley, 1896; Synanthedon culiciformis var. biannulata Dalla Torre & Strand, 1925; Sesia culiciformis ab. bianulata Bartel, 1902; Trochilium culiciformis ab. flavocingulata Spuler, 1910; Trochilium culiciformis ab. triannulata Spuler, 1910; Aegeria culiciformis ab. albocingulata Cockayne, 1955

= Synanthedon culiciformis =

Species of moth

Synanthedon culiciformis, known as the large red-belted clearwing, is a moth of the family Sesiidae. It is found in the Palearctic and Nearctic realms.

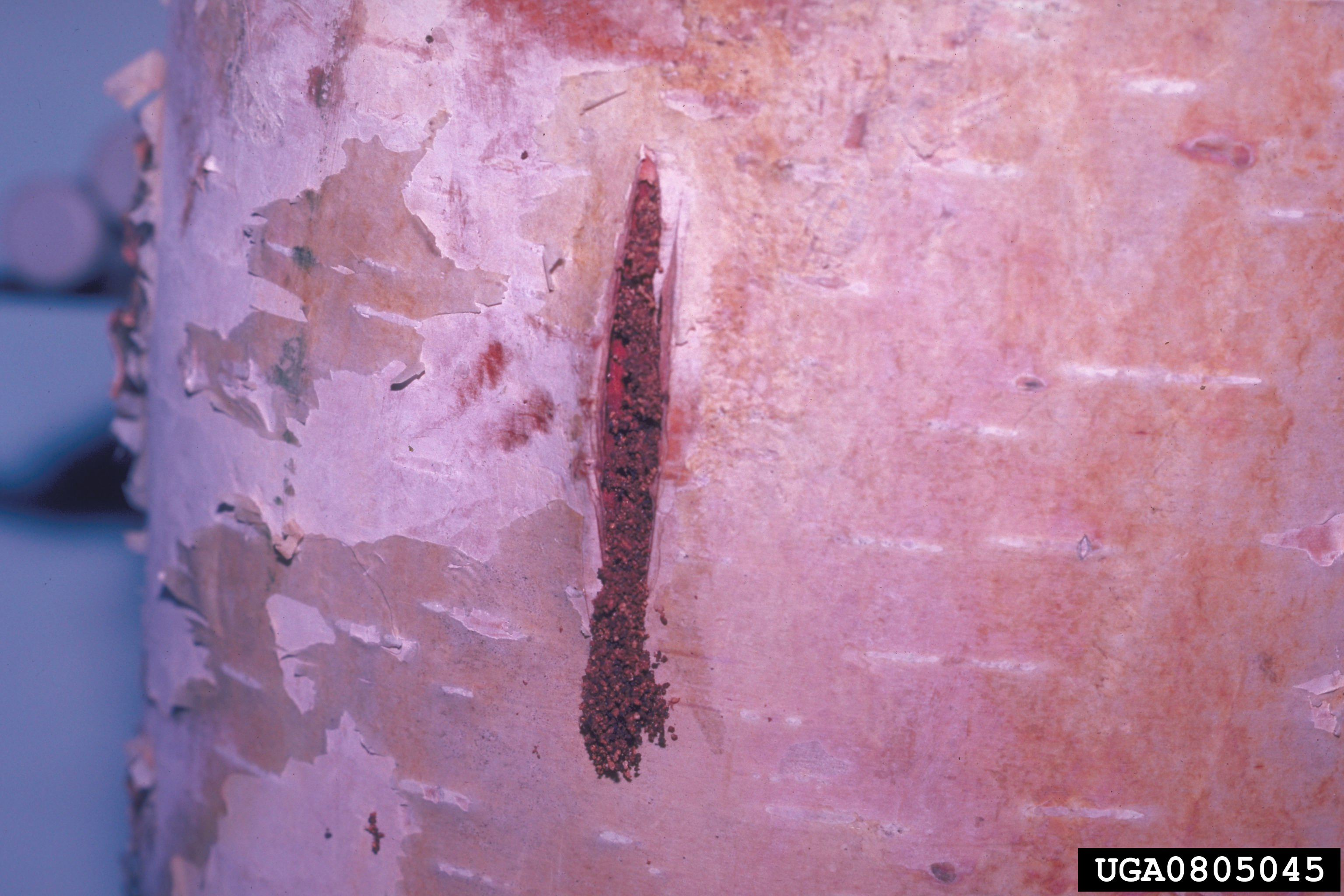
Damage

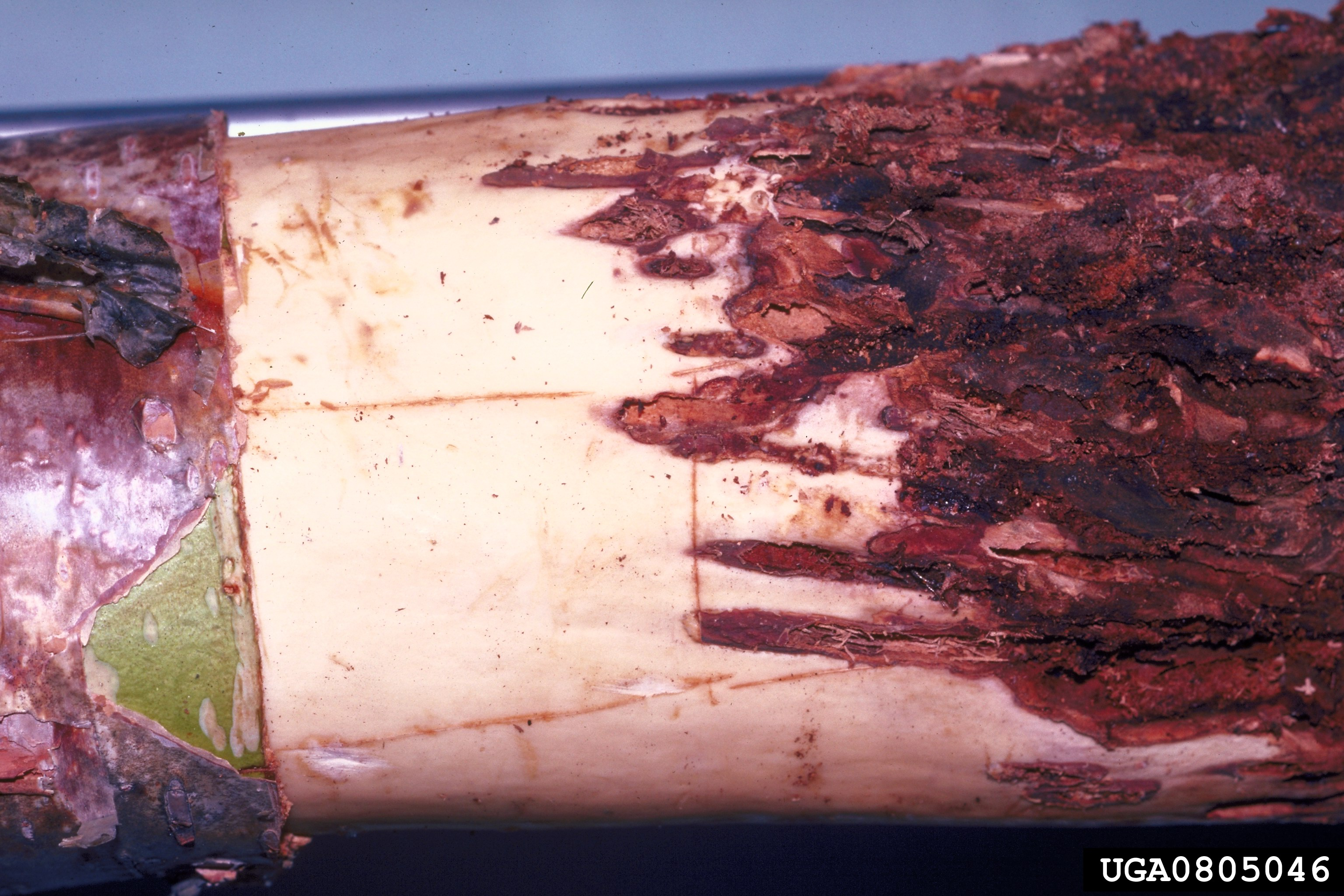
Galleries

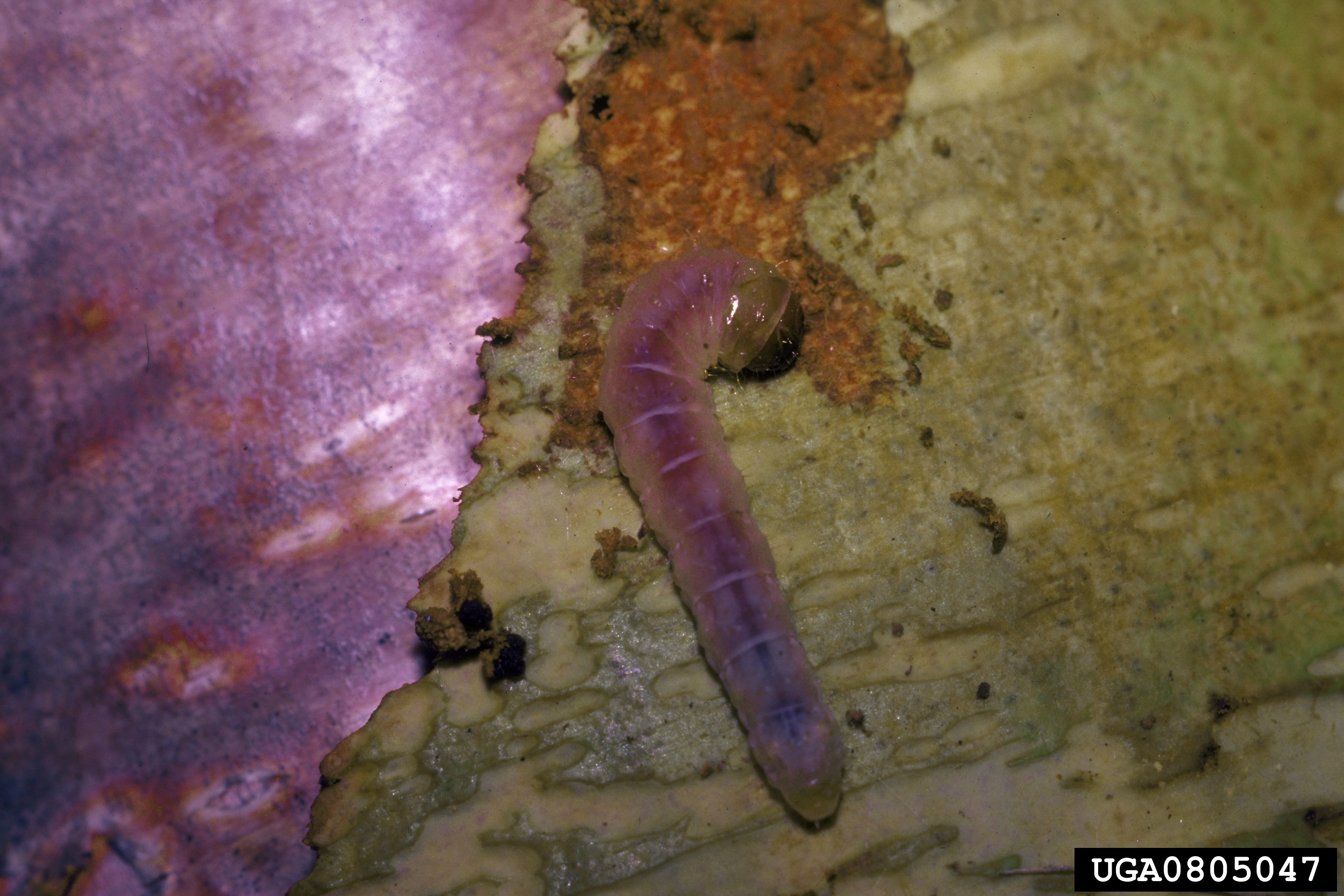
Larva

The wingspan is 23–27 millimetres (0.91–1.06 in). The length of the forewings is 12–14 mm (0.47–0.55 in). The moth flies from April to August depending on the location.

The larvae feed on various deciduous trees, especially birch but also alder.
