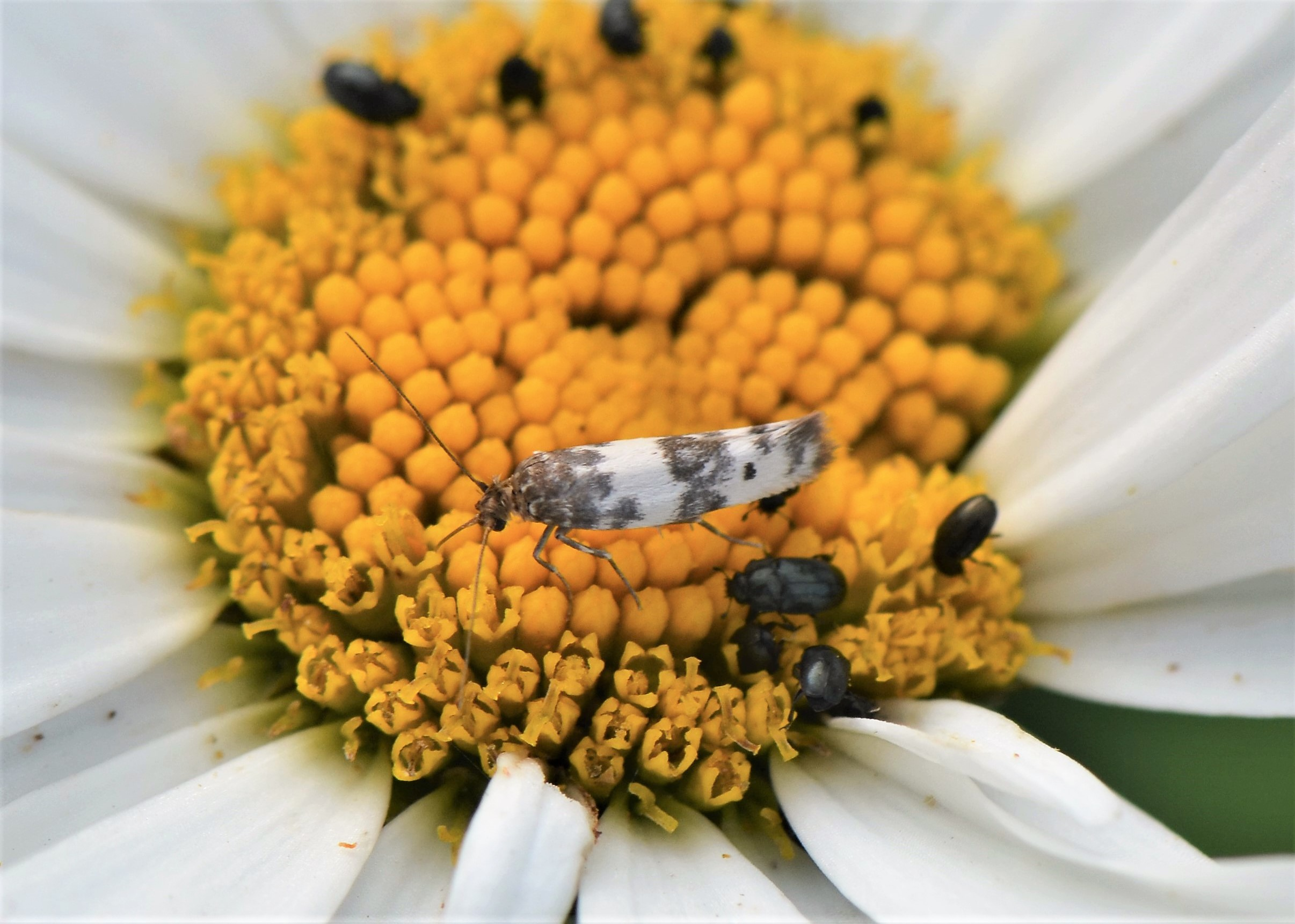
- Enolmis acanthella

Scientific classification
- Domain: Eukaryota
- Kingdom: Animalia
- Phylum: Arthropoda
- Class: Insecta
- Order: Lepidoptera
- Family: Scythrididae
- Genus: Enolmis
- Species: E. acanthella

Binomial name
- Enolmis acanthella (Godart, 1824)

Synonyms
- Yponomeuta acanthella Godart, 1824; Oecophora gallicella Zeller, 1839; Bryophaga tavaresi Monteiro, 1961

= Enolmis acanthella =

Species of moth

Enolmis acanthella is a moth of the family Scythrididae. It was described by Jean-Baptiste Godart in 1824. It is found in north-western Africa, Portugal, Spain, Italy and Switzerland. The species is spreading its distribution area. It was first sighted in France near Nancy in 1988 and since 1991 it regularly occurs in the city of Luxembourg. In 1998, it was also found in south-eastern Luxembourg and in 1999, it was collected in Saarland, Germany.

The wingspan is 12–19 mm. Adults are on wing from May to late September in one generation.

The first-instar larvae have been recorded feeding on lichen, including Lecanora dispersa, Lecanora dispersella and Caloplaca flavocitrina.
