= Enolmis bimerdella =

Scientific classification
- Kingdom: Animalia
- Phylum: Arthropoda
- Class: Insecta
- Order: Lepidoptera
- Family: Scythrididae
- Genus: Enolmis
- Species: E. bimerdella

Binomial name
- Enolmis bimerdella (Staudinger, 1859)

Synonyms
- Butalis bimerdella Staudinger, 1859

Species of moth

Enolmis bimerdella is a moth of the family Scythrididae. It was described by Otto Staudinger in 1859. It is found in Spain.
