= Enolmis nevadensis =

Scientific classification
- Domain: Eukaryota
- Kingdom: Animalia
- Phylum: Arthropoda
- Class: Insecta
- Order: Lepidoptera
- Family: Scythrididae
- Genus: Enolmis
- Species: E. nevadensis

Binomial name
- Enolmis nevadensis Passerin d'Entrèves, 1997

Species of moth

Enolmis nevadensis is a moth of the family Scythrididae. It was described by Pietro Passerin d'Entrèves in 1997. It is found in Spain (Sierra Nevada).

== Etymology ==
The species name refers to the type locality, the Sierra Nevada in Spain.
