= Enolmis delicatella =

Scientific classification
- Domain: Eukaryota
- Kingdom: Animalia
- Phylum: Arthropoda
- Class: Insecta
- Order: Lepidoptera
- Family: Scythrididae
- Genus: Enolmis
- Species: E. delicatella

Binomial name
- Enolmis delicatella (Rebel, 1901)

Synonyms
- Scythris acanthella v. delicatella Rebel, 1901; Bryophaga royovillanovai Agenjo, 1962

Species of moth

Enolmis delicatella is a moth of the family Scythrididae. It was described by Hans Rebel in 1901. It is found in Portugal and Spain.
