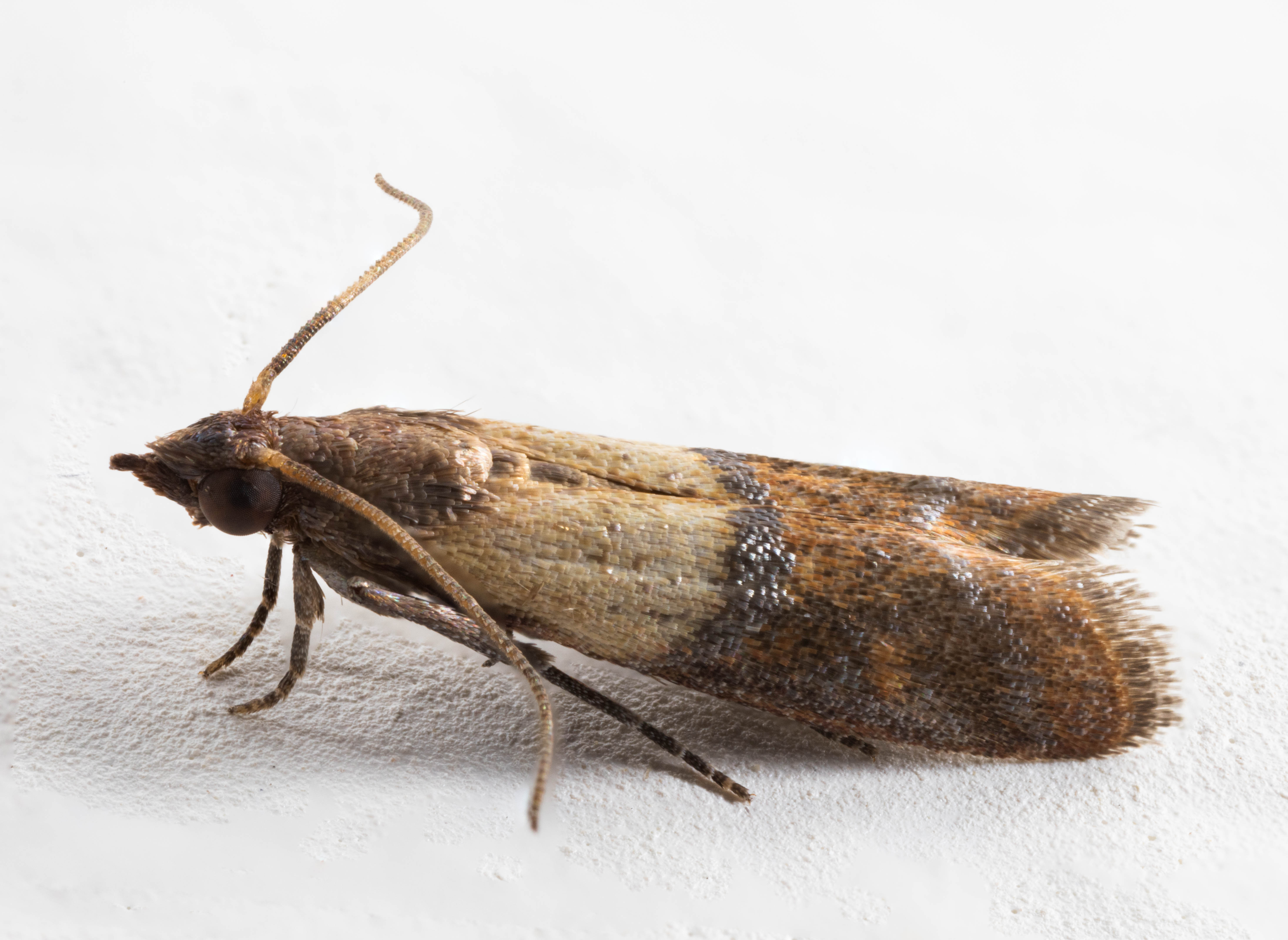

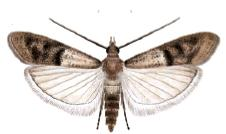

Scientific classification
- Kingdom: Animalia
- Phylum: Arthropoda
- Clade: Pancrustacea
- Class: Insecta
- Order: Lepidoptera
- Family: Pyralidae
- Tribe: Phycitini
- Genus: Plodia; Guenée, 1845
- Species: P. interpunctella

Binomial name
- Plodia interpunctella (Hübner, [1813])

Synonyms
- Many, see text

= Indianmeal moth =

Species of moth

The Indianmeal moth (Plodia interpunctella), also spelled Indian meal moth and Indian-meal moth, is a pyraloid moth of the family Pyralidae. Alternative common names are weevil moth, pantry moth, flour moth or grain moth. The almond moth (Cadra cautella) and the raisin moth (Cadra figulilella) are commonly confused with the Indianmeal moth due to similar food sources and appearance. The species was named for feeding on Indian meal (the cornmeal and maize flour from maize), with Indian in the New World sense; it does not occur natively in India. It is also not to be confused with the Mediterranean flour moth (Ephestia kuehniella), another common pest of stored grains.

P. interpunctella larvae (caterpillars) are commonly known as waxworms. They are not the same species as the waxworms often bred as animal feed. Rather, they are a common grain-feeding pest found around the world, consuming cereals, fruits, and similar products. Substantial efforts have been taken in the United States to control the moth's damage to grain crops.

The larvae of this species have the ability to bite through plastic and cardboard so even sealed containers may be infested. Once found, the moths are difficult to eradicate. The last larval instar is also able to travel long distances before pupating; so a new infestation site may develop far from the last pupation site. In addition to food sources, this species can reproduce and pupate on clothing and any source of clothing must be inspected to prevent reinfestation.

== Distribution and habitat ==
Plodia interpunctella is found on every continent in tropical habitats, excluding Antarctica. Within the United States, the moth is most commonly found in Florida, where it thrives in the tropical habitat. The moth lives in a wide range of conditions, making it a persistent pest. It is often found at food storage facilities worldwide, specifically in grain bins or grain storage buildings.

== Taxonomy and etymology ==
The Indianmeal moth is the only known living species of the genus Plodia. It is closely related to the genera Cadra and Ephestia, which include other pest species like E. kuehniella, also known as the "flour moth".

The species has been described under a number of junior synonyms, which may occasionally still be found in non-entomological sources.

- Ephestia glycinivora Matsumura, 1917
- Ephestia glycinivorella Matsumura, 1932 (unjustified emendation)
- Plodia castaneella (Reutti, 1898)
- Plodia glycinivora (Matsumura, 1917)
- Plodia interpunctalis (Hübner, 1825)
- Plodia latercula (Hampson, 1901)
- Plodia zeae (Fitch, 1856)
- Tinea castaneella Reutti, 1898
- Tinea interpunctalis Hübner, 1825
- Tinea interpunctella Hübner, [1813]
- Tinea zeae Fitch, 1856
- Unadilla latercula Hampson, 1901

The common name, "Indianmeal moth", for this species was coined by Asa Fitch, an entomologist employed by the state of New York in the 19th century. In a report published in 1856, Fitch discussed the species, noting that the larvae had been observed to infest stores of cornmeal, which at the time was referred to as "Indian meal".

== Description ==
Adults are 8–10 millimetres (5/16–13/32 in) in length with 16–20 millimetres (5/8–13/16 in) wingspans. The distal two thirds of their forewings are generally reddish brown in color with a copper luster. They can also be bronze or dark gray. The more proximal parts of the wings are yellow-gray or white-gray, with a dark band at the intersection between the proximal and distal regions. The hindwings, in general, are uniformly gray.

The eggs of the Indianmeal moth are white, ovate, and very small. It is difficult to see them with the naked eye. Newly hatched larvae are equally difficult to see. They are mostly off-white in color, have brown heads, and develop through five to seven larval instars. When these larvae mature, they measure about 12–14 millimetres (15/32–9/16 in) long. Larvae also have three sets of legs near the head and five sets of prolegs protruding from the abdomen. The legs help the larvae move over long distances in order to find pupation sites.

== Food resources ==
Indianmeal moths feed on plants, grains, and other human food products.

=== Plant-based foods ===
Moths feed on many plant-based foods including dry pet food (plant based), birdseed, cereal, soup mixes, bread, pasta, rice, flour, spices, dried fruits and nuts. There is strong evidence that the northern Manitoba wheat supports the development of the moth. Other optimal diets include sultanas, American yellow corn and almonds. Groundnuts and maize meal, on the other hand, result in a longer development time for the moths.

=== Non-plant foods ===
Indianmeal moths are also known to cannibalize larvae. This often leads to viral granulosis infections spreading through an Indianmeal moth population. Healthy larvae are picked more often than unhealthy larvae for cannibalism. There appears to be no kin discrimination and siblings can be eaten by caterpillars.

=== Foraging flights ===
Though Indianmeal moths generally do not migrate over long distances, they do engage in long-distance foraging flights. These flights take place during the twilight hours during which blue light (400–475 nm) rather than UV light (10–400 nm) is dominant and attracts the moths. Blue light's role in the Indianmeal moth foraging behavior has recently been harnessed as a form of pest control since it is attractive to the moth.

== Life history ==
=== Eggs ===
Usually the life cycle of an Indianmeal moth colony starts in a location where grain is present. The temperature within a grain bin must exceed 50 °F (10 °C). The eggs of the moth are grayish white and have a length between 0.3 and 0.5 millimetres (1/64 and 3/128 in). Eggs can be laid directly on the food source singly or in groups of between 12 and 30. A mature female may lay between 100 and 300 eggs at a time.

=== Larvae ===
Larvae begin to hatch in approximately two to fourteen days. The larvae have between five and seven instars. Newly hatched larvae feed on grain while more mature larvae feed on grain germ. The larvae are an off-white color, but can be pink, brown, or greenish. They are about 12 mm long and have prolegs for movement. Fully grown larvae are able to spin webs and leave silk threads in their path of travel. Mature larvae that make silk also make threaded cocoons.

=== Adults ===
The pupae are often seen on grain surfaces and on the walls of grain bins. The adults emerge in four to ten days. They then mate and the cycle begins again. The entire life cycle of this species ranges between 30 and 300 days. A typical life cycle is 50 days. Under optimal conditions a life cycle can be as short as 28 days but cooler winter months prohibit this. Seven to nine generations of moths can live in a year.

=== Diapause ===
Diapause is defined as a delay in animal development due to certain external factors and can end once the adverse environmental conditions wear off. The duration of diapause can vary in Indianmeal moths. Diapause is especially prevalent late in the breeding season. During the egg stage, if the temperature of the moth's environment exceeds 25 °C (77 °F), it can cause a delay in hatching. In the moth's early larval stage, temperatures of below 20 °C (68 °F) can cause a similar diapause. Different strains of P. interpunctella have differing tendencies to enter diapause.

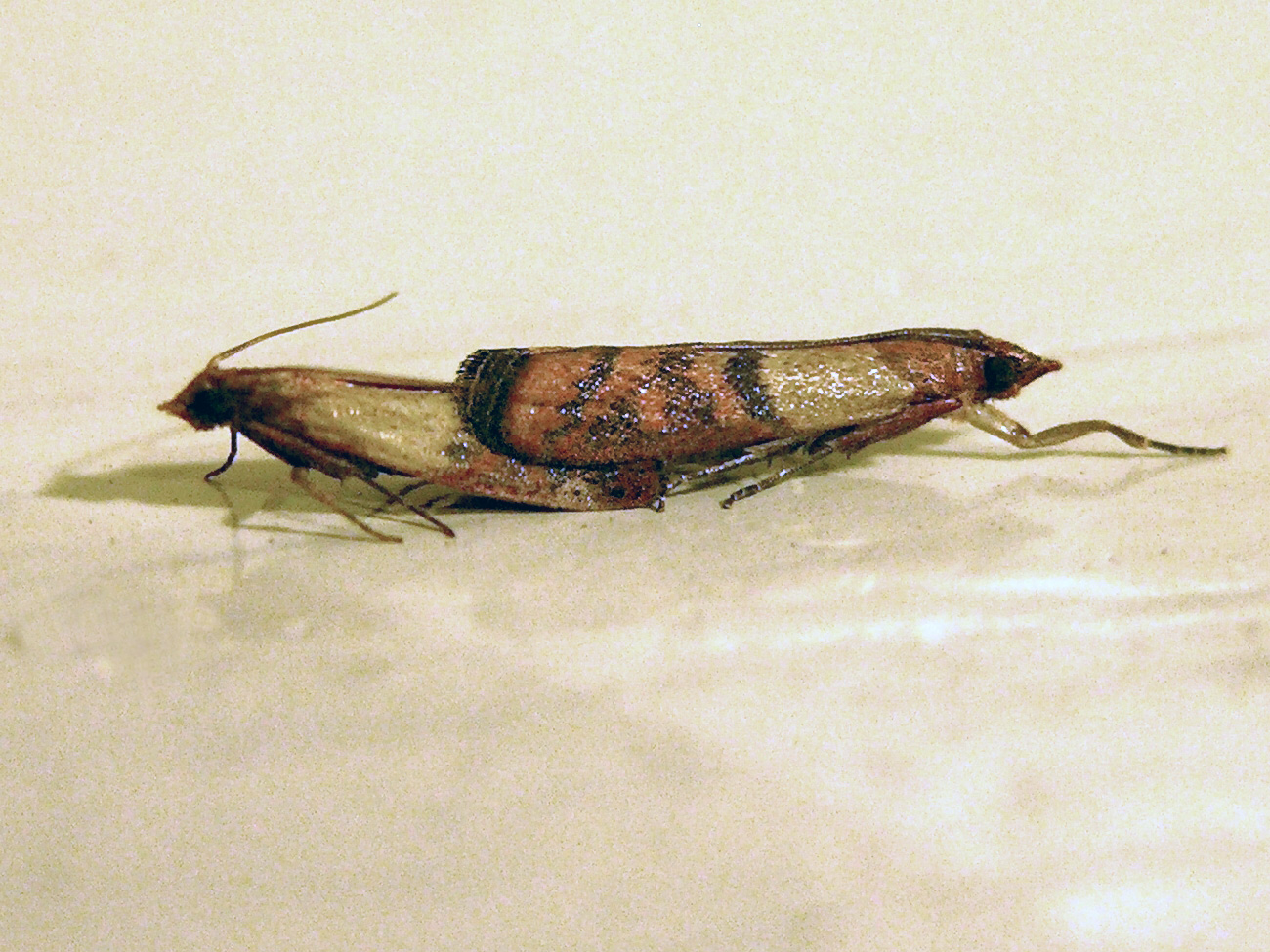
Mating adults

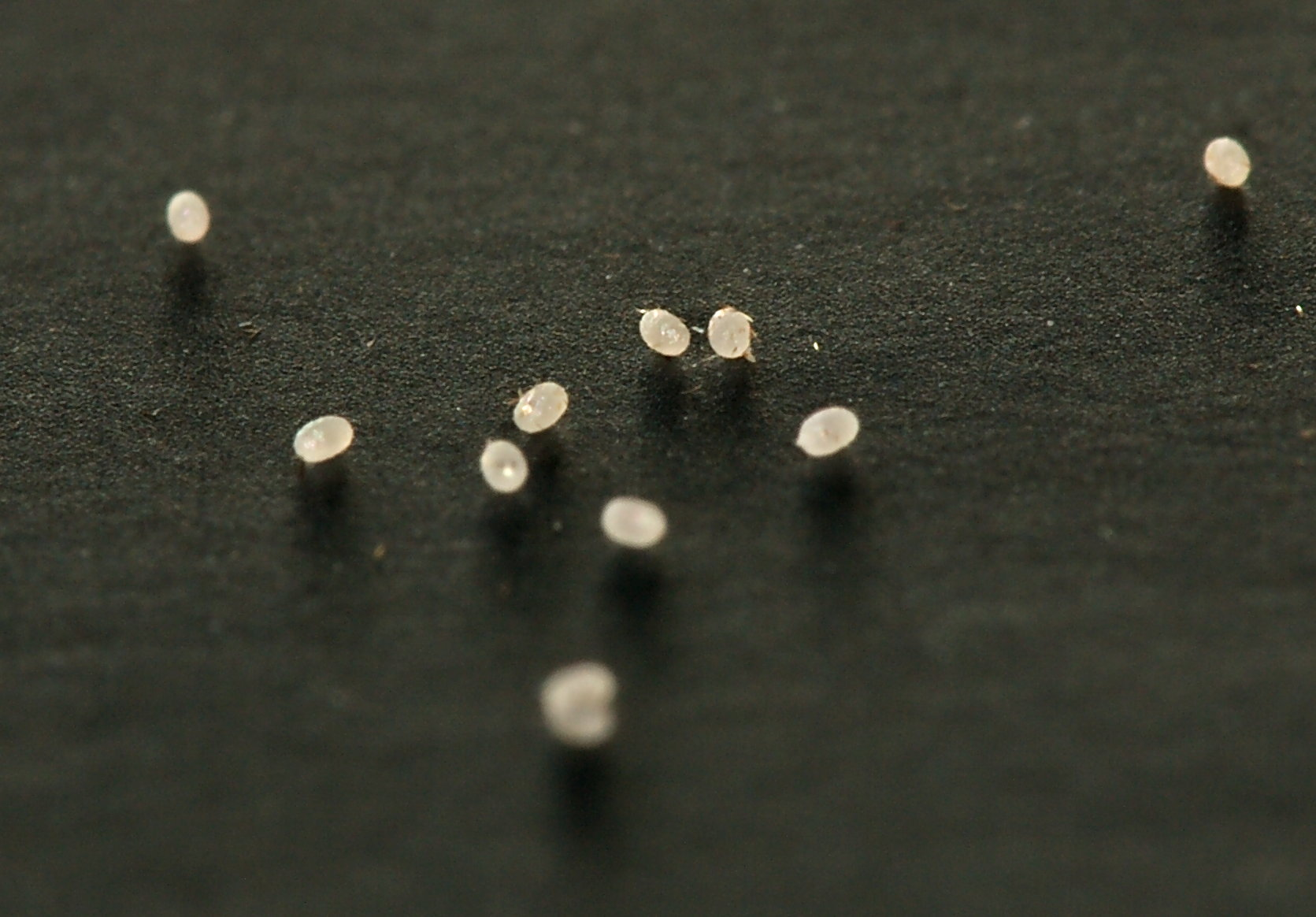
Freshly laid eggs

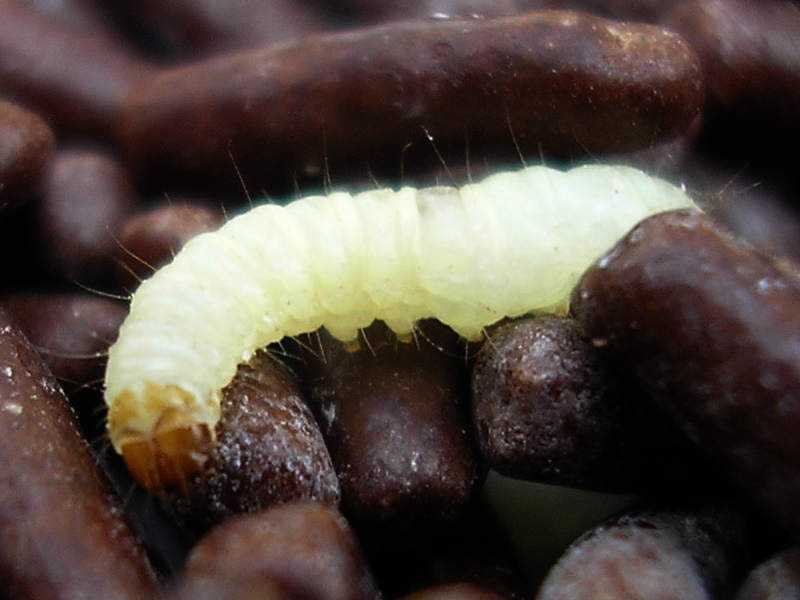
Larva on sprinkles

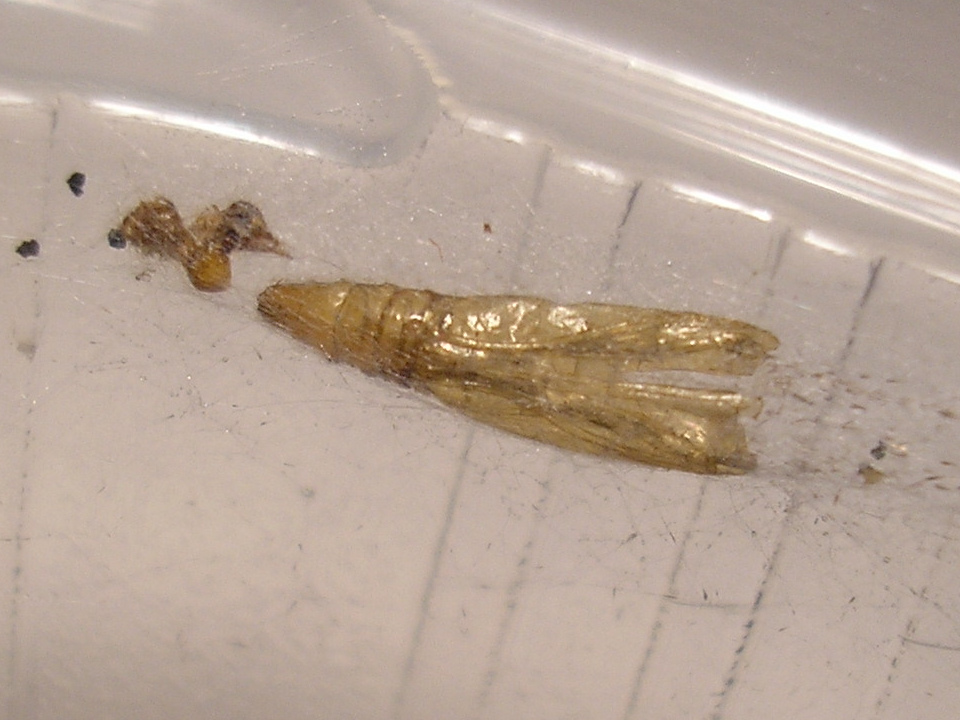
Empty pupal case

== Enemies ==
=== Predators ===
- Nocturnal insectivores: birds, bats, and owls
- Lizards (Lacertilia)
- Rodents (Rodentia)
- Spiders (Arachnida)
- Other cannibalistic Indianmeal moths

=== Parasites ===
- Habrobracon hebetor is a parasitoid wasp that is commonly used in biological control. The adult wasp finds and paralyzes the Indian meal moth's larva with a sting. After immobilizing the larva, the wasp deposits its eggs on the host's body. After hatching, the wasp larvae feed on the host moth larva; their gut enzymes denature the host's blood proteins, ultimately killing it.

=== Diseases ===
- Baculoviruses are double-stranded DNA viruses commonly used as biological control agents for the Indianmeal moth and are considered parasites. They come from a family of viruses that are limited to insects as hosts. Baculovirus isolates have been often isolated from other Lepidoptera. At sub-lethal dosages, baculoviruses decrease reproductive capacity in terms of egg viability and production.

=== Immunity ===
Indianmeal moths are developing a resistance to many kinds of biological agents, such as the granulosis virus. Use of pest-control agents can cause resistance to these agents to be selected for in populations of Indianmeal moths. In populations exposed to the granulosis virus, it was found that the moths were 96 times more resistant to the virus; this led to the prohibition of many such biological agents.

Regulations prevent the use of many pesticides near food sources, so these pests are highly suitable for control with natural predators.

== Mating ==
=== Male–male interactions ===
==== Sperm competition ====
Females mate multiple times, so sperm competition could be an important aspect of male–male competition for being reproductively successful. Males have a limited number of sperm and allocate it depending on various factors. Male Indianmeal moths ejaculate a greater amount of sperm to females that have mated multiple times previously. This is to ensure a greater chance of success in sperm competition in the females' storage organs. Males also ejaculate more sperm when mating with a younger female.

==== Food and pupation site competition ====
The most common type of competition in Indianmeal moths is due to a lack of food. This competition can change the timing of male and female emergence, reducing the chance of early males finding females to mate with, which could encourage emigration. This is considered a form of male–male competition because males that emerge at an appropriate time are more likely to be reproductively successful with the surrounding females.

Males are also involved in finding pupation sites. If the larvae do not find pupation sites in the food layer, they may wander long distances to find one. This competition to find a pupation site affects males more than it does females, it indirectly impacts females as well because it results in a delayed population of males to mate with.

=== Female–male interactions ===
==== Female pheromones ====
In the Indianmeal moth, mating occurs a few days after the adult moth emerges from the silk cocoon. Mating rituals are largely limited to pheromones release by the female. There are four identified (via mass spectrometry techniques) primary pheromones in the female pheromone blend: (Z,E)-9,12-tetradecadienyl acetate, (Z,E)-9,12-tetradecadienal, (Z,E)-9,12-tetradecadienol, and (Z)-9-tetradecenyl acetate. These pheromones are attractants to male moths. Removing any one component of the blend reduces the activity of the pheromone and the number of males attracted. Other components of the pheromone blend are also known but their functions are unclear. It has been suggested the reason for having so many components to the pheromone is that it ensures species specificity.

==== Male pheromones ====
Male moths also release pheromones. After approaching the female from the back, the male releases a pheromone from wing glands located at the base of each forewing. These pheromones induce the female to remain stationary in the acceptance posture (raised abdomen between wings) which facilitates copulation.

==== Copulation and multiple mating ====
Indianmeal moths are known to mate multiple times. For males, it is vital to ensure paternity after copulation. To ensure this trait, males who mate with a female first (before any other males) will insert a large package of spermatophore, accessory gland fluids, and nutrients into the bursa copulatrix of the female during copulation. Other donations after the first mating are smaller in size. Even so, there is no change in postcopulatory behavior in females after this large donation (with respect to pheromone production and calling behavior).

==== Changes in fecundity ====
It has been observed in many insects that vital resources are tracked using odor plumes. For the Indianmeal moth these odors have other effects as well. The Indianmeal moth's fecundity and fertility was found to be enhanced in the presence of the odor of vital nutrients. This effect is thought to be genetic since it is not related to parental generations or previous experiences in the lifetime of the moth. Females also show a strong preference towards laying their eggs near the site of the odor. It was observed that without antennae, this effect is lost, suggesting that there are olfactory receptors in the antennae.

==== Interspecific courting ====
The Indianmeal moth often takes part in interspecific courtship especially with the almond moth (Cadra cautella). Successful mating between the species does not happen due to multiple isolation mechanisms. The main mechanism that has been identified is the male sex pheromone. This pheromone is a strong species recognition signal. It allows the almond moth to differentiate between members of its own species and members of the Indianmeal moth species. There are also mechanical barriers to insemination that render the species incompatible. Their courtship behaviors are also relatively incompatible. Thus, copulation rarely occurs.

Even when courtship does continue to a later stage, the female of the other species rejects the male due to the wrong pheromone being released at the wrong time from scent scales. Even with these fail safes, some male almond moths are still excited by Indianmeal moth females. They may be able to successfully copulate, but insemination is not possible.

== Pest status and pest control ==
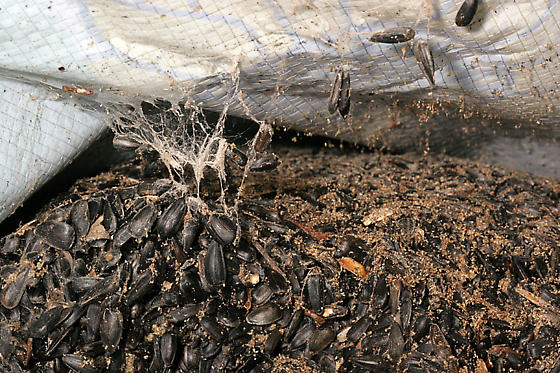
Damage to sunflower seeds

=== Status ===
Indianmeal moth larvae can infest a wide range of dry foodstuffs of vegetable origin, such as cereal, bread, pasta, rice, couscous, flour, spices, dried fruits, and nuts. More unusual recorded foods include crushed red pepper, chocolate and cocoa beans, coffee substitute, cookies, dried mangelwurzel, and even the toxic seeds of jimsonweed (Datura stramonium). They have also been known to infest commercial pet food, such as cracked corn used for bird feed. They often leave webbing in the food they infest.

=== Control ===
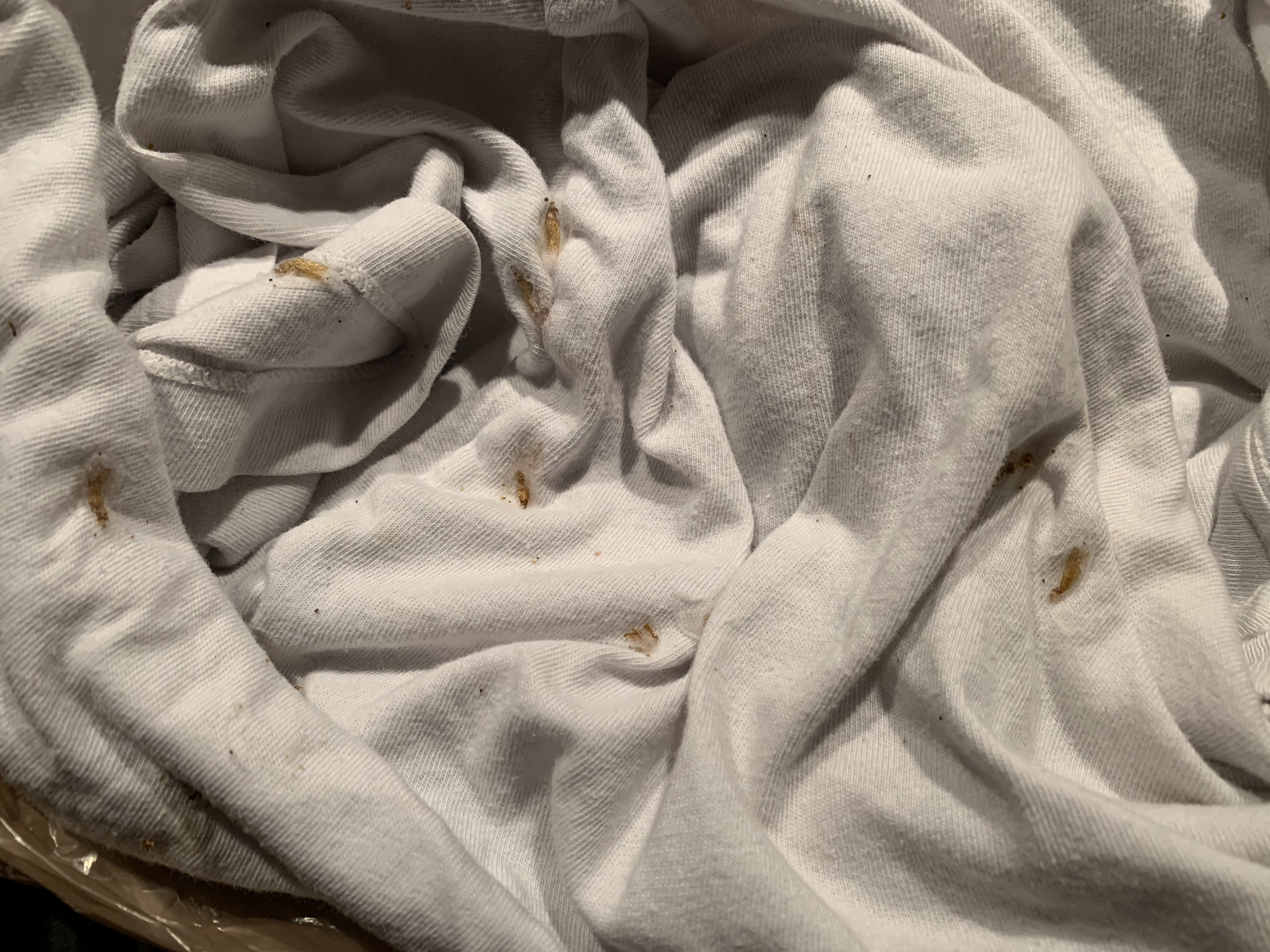
Hidden inside a single cotton T-shirt, pantry moths can pupate to adult form.

After larvae or moths have been found, it is important to throw out all food sources not in very tightly sealed containers. Moth larvae can chew through plastic bags and thin cardboard, so even unopened packages may become infested. They are also notoriously difficult to get rid of, and can crawl on ceilings and spin cocoons in rooms other than where they hatched. Last instar larvae are able to travel significant distances before they pupate. When seeking the source of an infestation, the search thus cannot be limited to the immediate area where pupae are discovered. Pantry moths can use clothing (remaining hidden) to reproduce and pupate, so it is important to inspect any source of clothing material.

None of the stages of the organism (eggs, larvae, adults) are temperature tolerant and can be killed by a week of freezing or by brief heating in a microwave or conventional oven when such treatment is practical. Scrubbing infested areas with a mixture of soap and water or vinegar is also effective.

Nontoxic traps are available to monitor outbreaks. One type of trap is a triangular box with a pheromone lure and sticky walls inside. These traps are known as pheromone traps. Male moths are attracted by the female pheromone (the lure) and stick against the sticky walls inside the box.

The efficiency of traps is doubtful as they only capture males, and usually only a fraction of them, while adult females, eggs and larvae are unaffected, enabling a possible reinfestation. It is most effective to treat the infestation by eliminating the source and any affected food items, interrupting their mating processes, and repelling them from the areas where dried food and grains are kept. It is recommended to first eliminate the source of infestation followed by larvae, eggs, and eventually moths.

The caterpillars are parasitized by Habrobracon hebetor, a braconid wasp which is a potential biological control agent.

Additionally, blue to violet light can be very effective in drawing moths out, which suggests that the deployment of violet light could become another pest-control tactic for these moths.
