= Tetradecadienyl acetates =

Various tetradecadienyl acetate compounds serve as insect mating pheromones especially among the Pyralidae. These include:

- (Z,E)-3,5-tetradecadienyl acetate — Prionoxystus robiniaea mating attractant
- (E,E)-3,5-tetradecadienyl acetate — Accosus centerensis mating attractant
- (Z,E)-4,8-tetradecadienyl acetate — Borkhausenia schefferella mating attractant
- (Z,Z)-7,11-tetradecadienyl acetate — Conistra vaccinii mating attractant
- (Z,E)-9,11-tetradecadienyl acetate (abbr. Z9,E11-14:Ac) — Spodoptera littoralis and S. litura mating attractant and mating inhibitor. Female pheromone, lures males. Used by McVeigh and Bettany 1986 and Downham et al., 1995 over the course of three years in a 99:1 with (E,E)-10,12-tetradecadienyl acetate. Although they achieved good mating disruption this did not result in lower egg mass or population. The results of Campion et al., 1980 suggest that may be due to the need for other, minor female volatiles. Martinez et al., 1993 study control of its synthesis in S. littoralis by hormones, finding that the reduction step may be controlled by pheromone biosynthesis activating neuropeptide.
- (Z,Z)-9,12-tetradecadienyl acetate — Plodia interpunctella mating inhibitor
- (Z,E)-9,12-tetradecadienyl acetate (abbr. Z9,E12-14:Ac) — In 2006 the United States Environmental Protection Agency granted an exemption to permit use without regard to the residue on resulting food. This is thought to be the first registration for indoor use in the United States of any sex pheromone to disrupt mating. Produced by species:
  - Adoxophyes fasciata synergistic attractant
  - Anagasta kuehniella mating attractant produced by both male and female
  - Cadra cautella female-produced mating attractant and mating inhibitor (found by Kuwahara et al., 1971)
  - C. figulilella female-produced mating attractant
  - Elasmopalpus lignosellus mating disruptor
  - Ephestia elutella mating attractant
  - Plodia interpunctella (also by Kuwahara 1971)
