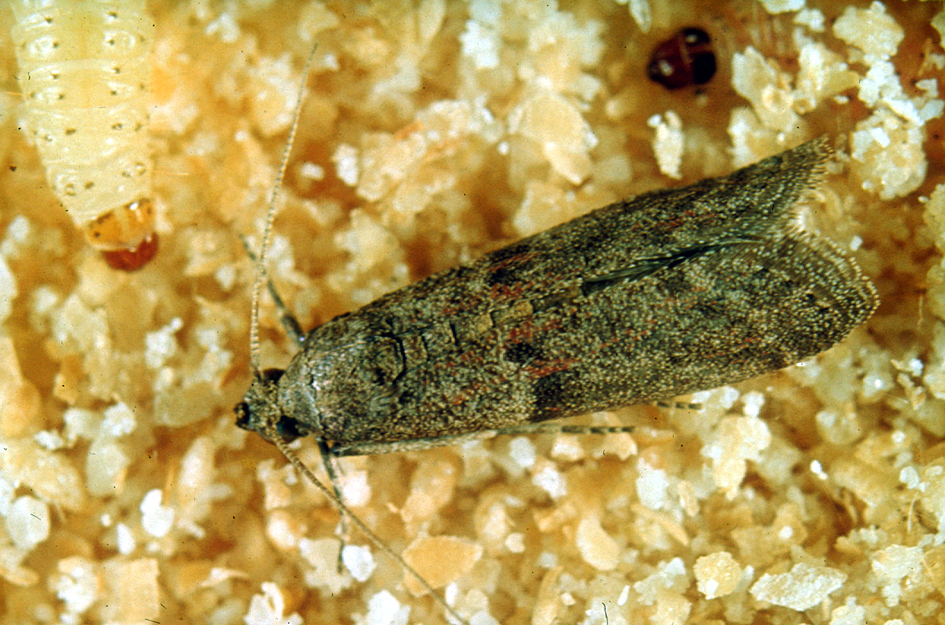
- Caterpillar and moth
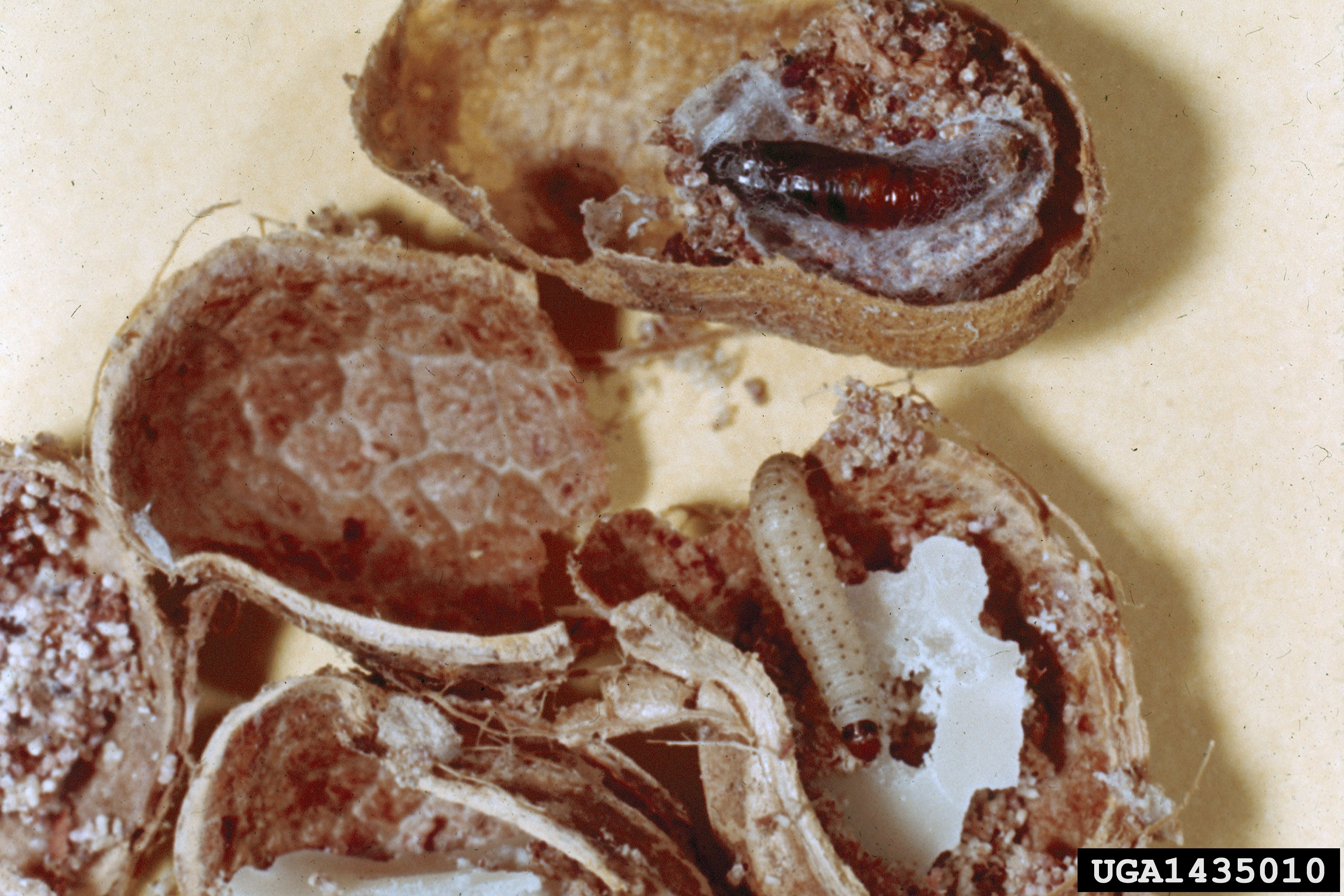
- Caterpillar (below) and pupa (above) in peanut husks

Scientific classification
- Kingdom: Animalia
- Phylum: Arthropoda
- Clade: Pancrustacea
- Class: Insecta
- Order: Lepidoptera
- Family: Pyralidae
- Genus: Cadra
- Species: C. cautella

Binomial name
- Cadra cautella (Walker, 1863)

Synonyms
- Numerous, see text

= Almond moth =

Species of moth

The almond moth or tropical warehouse moth (Cadra cautella) is a small, stored-product pest. Almond moths infest flour, bran, oats, and other grains, as well as dried fruits. It belongs to the family of snout moths (Pyralidae), and more specifically to the tribe Phycitini of the huge snout moth subfamily Phycitinae. This species may be confused with the related Indian mealmoth (Plodia interpunctella) or the Mediterranean flour moth (Ephestia kuehniella), which are also common pantry pests in the same subfamily.

Other common names, particularly in nonbiological literature, are dried currant moth and fig moth, which invite confusion with the close relatives Cadra figulilella (raisin moth) and Cadra calidella (dried fruit moth). Like the raisin moth, the almond moth has achieved an essentially cosmopolitan distribution due to inadvertent transport with food products in its larval form. Adults live for about 10 days after eclosion and do not eat, but may drink if water is available. The mating system is polygamous; however, many females will only mate once.

== Description and identification ==
Adult almond moths are predominantly light brown in color, with smaller hind wings that are typically gray. When extended, its wingspan ranges from 14 to 22 mm. The back edges of the wings are lined with a short fringe. Almond moth larvae are mostly gray with darker heads. The caterpillar is 12–15 mm long and identifiable by the pattern of spots along its back.

For identification see References

== Geographic range ==
Almond moths are found around the world. Although it thrives best in tropical climates, it has spread to many regions around the globe due to its tendency to infest dry goods that are shipped internationally. For example, it has been transported across Polynesia with copra shipments.

== Habitat ==
As almond moths exists primarily as a pest, its habitat is often some kind of dry food product which is stored in a warehouse or similar industrial environment. Most commonly, they are found in dried fruits, but they have also been found in nuts, beans, flour, and other grains.

== Food sources ==
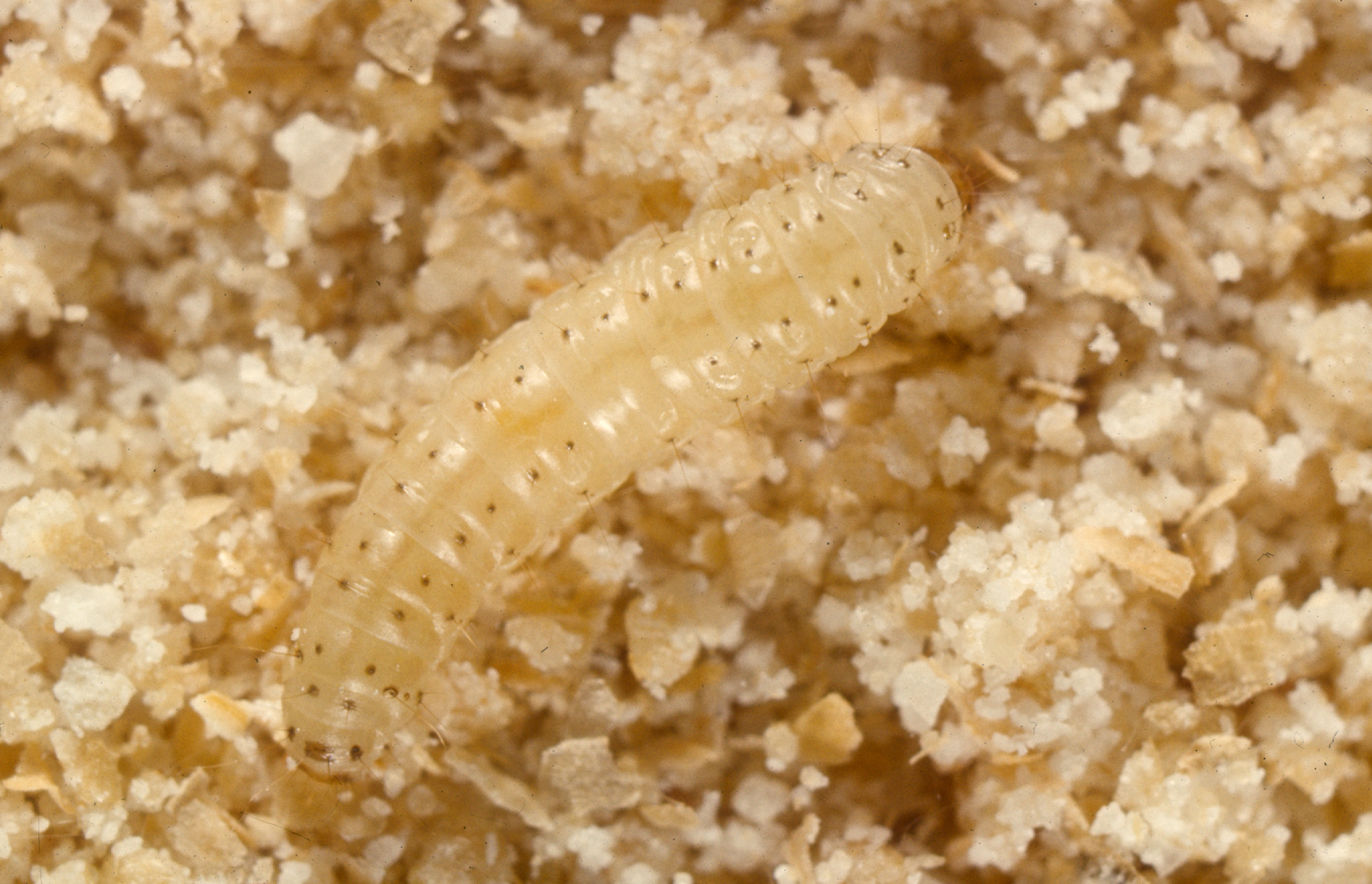
almond moth larva

=== Larvae ===
Larval almond moths are hatched onto a variety of dry food products, which then serve as their primary food source. Although the moth infests several different kinds of food, the larvae develop most rapidly on wheat-based products. Moreover, cracked or ground seed and grain products are more ideal for larvae than whole seeds or grains because the larvae are unable to penetrate shells or hulls, which makes feeding more difficult. The caterpillars are cannibalistic; larvae will also eat eggs and other smaller larvae.

=== Adults ===
Adult almond moths do not eat during their short lifespan but will drink water if they have access to it.

== Parental care ==
=== Oviposition ===
Generally, adult female moths will oviposit around 200 eggs at a time. The timing and number of eggs oviposited has been shown to vary based on several factors, including temperature, humidity, access to water, and type of food source. Low temperatures delay oviposition, and low humidity or lack of access to water seems to reduce the number of eggs oviposited by any given female. Preferred food source upon which to oviposit may vary with the strain of almond moth. Typically, females will oviposit at night.

== Life history ==
=== Life cycle ===
The almond moth thrives best in warm, humid environments. The ideal temperature range for development is 30–32 degrees Celsius (86–90 degrees Fahrenheit), and the ideal humidity range is 70-80%. In optimal conditions, it takes about three and a half days for eggs to hatch, and the larvae go through five instars over a period ranging from 17 to 37 days. The pupal stages lasts around seven days in optimal temperature and humidity. Adult females live on average for ten days and adult males live for an average of six to seven days.

== Enemies ==
=== Predators ===
Xylocoris flavipes is a type of true bug which feeds preferentially on the eggs and early larval stages of the almond moth. Blattisocius tarsalis is a kind of mite which will feed on almond moth eggs throughout its life cycle, and has been considered as a mechanism for controlling infestations of the almond moth.

=== Parasites ===
A variety of species within the order Hymenoptera are parasites of the almond moth. Several parasites of the genus Trichogramma, including T. evanescens, T. cacoeciae, and T. brassicae are common among organisms in the order Lepidoptera and, as such, are known to parasitize almond moths. Trichogramma are very small wasps, and they will puncture the eggs of almond moths and leave their own progeny inside. These parasites will kill the larva inside and later emerge from the egg themselves. Other kinds of wasps, including Bracon hebetor and Venturia canescens, parasitize almond moth larvae in the later instars.

=== Diseases ===
Wolbachia is a type of bacteria which infects several types of invertebrates, including the almond moth. Wolbachia is transmitted from mother to offspring, as it resides in the ovaries of its host. As such, Wolbachia does not directly kill the infected moth which houses it, because its primary means of spreading are through the moth's reproduction. Only moths who live to adulthood will be able to reproduce and thus spread the bacteria further.

== Mating ==
=== Lifetime mating habits ===
Almond moths are largely polygynous; most males will remate multiple times, but only around 20% of females will remate. Although the amount of sperm produced by males decreases across subsequent copulations, this appears to have no effect on the number of eggs laid and offspring hatched by the female. However, larger spermatophores are correlated with several outcomes that benefit male moths. First, a large spermatophore decreases the likelihood that the recipient female will remate, and if she does, a large spermatophore ensures a better chance of paternity for the first male moth. Mating decreases lifespan for both male and female moths relative to virgins.

=== Female/male interactions ===
In almond moths, females will initiate courtship by attracting a male through the adoption of several positions which indicate her receptivity for copulation. Female moths will start by taking on some variation of a calling posture, which typically involves a bowed abdomen, spread wings, and the release of pheromones from the female's ovipositor. Once a male has approached, the female will assume an acceptance posture. This is marked by tensing of the abdominal muscles, which raises the abdomen, spreads the wings, and retracts the ovipositor. To commence copulation, the female remains mostly stationary while the male goes through a series of movements known as "fronting-up", which ensures genital contact. Fronting-up involves the male positioning himself first in front of the female and rapidly flapping his wings, which contain many scent scales. Eventually, the male will make a complete rotation so that they are facing in opposite directions with only their genitalia in contact. The female will either assume an acceptance posture, which essentially means that she remains immobile, or a rejection posture, which can involve movement away from the male or flapping of wings.

=== Factors affecting mating ===
In the almond moth, mating lasts between 1.5 and 2 hours. Female moths will mate with both virgin and mated males, but when given a choice in a laboratory setting, females preferentially copulated with mated males. During mating, males first deliver a volume of seminal compounds followed by the spermatophore. These seminal compounds appear to contain chemicals which decrease female remating, and enhance the number of eggs laid by the female. The prespermatophoric ejaculate also likely contains nutritive compounds, which contribute to the health of future offspring and the female herself. While instances of remating are low in almond moths, it is most likely to occur in instances where the female received only seminal compounds and no spermatophore. The spermatophore contains two different kinds of sperm: eupyrene sperm, which contains genetic material, and apyrene sperm, which is sterile. The presence of apyrene sperm is thought to produce a larger refractory period in the female moth by filling her reproductive tract, and thus prolonging the time period before she can remate. Male moths living in a population with high larval density produce higher ratios of apyrene to eupyrene sperm, presumably due to the fact that high larval population density increases the threat of sperm competition.

=== Interspecific mating ===
The almond moth often takes part in courtship with other species, especially with the Indian mealmoth (Plodia interpunctella). Even so, successful mating between the species is highly unlikely since they are mechanically isolated from one another. The male sex pheromone serves as a key species recognition signal. This, in addition to other mechanical barriers to insemination, make copulation rare.

== Interaction with humans ==
The almond moth is commonly regarded as a pest because it can be found in various kinds of dry food products including, but not limited to: dried fruits, wheat products, flours, nuts, and seeds. A variety of means by which to control the spread of almond moths have been explored. While pesticides and other chemical agents may reduce infestation, these products can present harmful consequences for the environment and for the humans who consume the foods on which the almond moth feeds. Thus, the exploration of natural enemies of the almond moth (including various kinds of predators and parasites) has been pursued as a means to control infestations.

== Synonyms ==
Because of its wide distribution and accidental introductions, it has become known under a number of junior synonyms:

- Cadra defectella Walker, 1864
- Cryptoblabes formosella Wileman & South, 1918
- Ephestia cautella (Walker, 1863)
- Ephestia irakella Amsel, 1959
- Ephestia passulella Barrett, 1875
- Ephestia pelopis Turner, 1947
- Ephestia rotundatella Turati, 1930
- Nephopteryx desuetella Walker, 1866
- Nephopterix passulella (Barret, 1875)
- Pempelia cautella Walker, 1863
