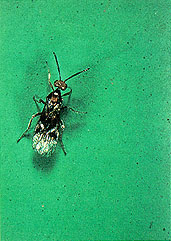

Scientific classification
- Kingdom: Animalia
- Phylum: Arthropoda
- Clade: Pancrustacea
- Class: Insecta
- Order: Hymenoptera
- Family: Braconidae
- Genus: Habrobracon
- Species: H. hebetor

Binomial name
- Habrobracon hebetor (Say, 1836)

Synonyms
- Bracon hebetor Say, 1836; Bracon juglandis Ashmead, 1889; Habrobracon juglandis (Ashmead, 1889); Braco brevicornis Wesmael, 1838; Bracon brevicornis Wesmael, 1838; Habrobracon brevicornis (Wesmael, 1838)

= Habrobracon hebetor =

Species of wasp

Habrobracon hebetor is a minute wasp of the family Braconidae that is an ectoparasitoid of several species of moth caterpillars. Well known hosts include the larval stage of Plodia interpunctella, the Indianmeal moth, the late larval stage of the Mediterranean flour moth and the almond moth, and the dried fruit moth (Cadra calidella). This parasitoid has been used commercially as a way to control pests without using chemical insecticides.

== Use in biological control ==
These wasps feed quickly, aided by their gut enzymes which quickly destroy the blood proteins in the moth larvae. This increases the value of the species as an effective biocontrol agent.

== Life cycle ==
At 30 °C (86 °F), the life cycle of the wasp is about ten to thirteen days from initial parasitism to final emergence of the adult. The adult female lives about 23 days during which it produces about 100 eggs. One to 8 eggs are deposited in individual, paralyzed, late instar moth larvae.

== Radiation ==
Habrobracon hebetor is remarkably resistant to radiation. While LD_{100} is estimated around 1000 rads for humans, and 56,128 rads (64,000 roentgens) for the fruit fly Drosophila melanogaster, a study showed that H. hebetor survived X-ray radiations of 158,080 rads (180,250 R). In this study, irradiated groups even had an increased life span compared to non-irradiated control groups, an effect attributed to the lack of activity of irradiated individuals. A similar effect has also been noticed in other insect species. However, female H. hebetor were sterilized at 4,210 rads (4,800 R) exposure. Another study showed that 218,373 rads (249,000 R) exposure instantly killed 100% H. hebetor.
