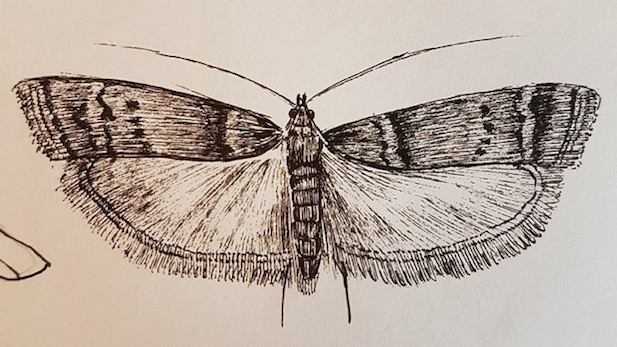

Scientific classification
- Kingdom: Animalia
- Phylum: Arthropoda
- Clade: Pancrustacea
- Class: Insecta
- Order: Lepidoptera
- Family: Pyralidae
- Genus: Cadra
- Species: C. calidella

Binomial name
- Cadra calidella (Guenée, 1845)

Synonyms
- Ephestia calidella Guenée, 1845; Ephestia bizonella Ragonot, 1888; Ephestia cahiritella Zeller, 1867; Ephestia xanthotricha Staudinger, 1869; Cadra calidella f. nubiella Roesler, 1965

= Cadra calidella =

Species of moth

Cadra calidella, the dried fruit or date moth, is a species of snout moth in the genus Cadra and commonly mistaken for the species Cadra figulilella. It thrives in warmer conditions and is found primarily in Mediterranean countries, although it can also be found in Central Asia, Kazakhstan, Transcaucasia, Caucasus, and the western part of Russia. It feeds on dried fruits, carobs, nuts and seeds, hence earning its colloquial name. This diet damages the food industry, and it is a common storage pest. Because of this, much research has been done to study ways to limit its reproduction rate and population size. It was first described by Achille Guenée in 1845.

== Taxonomy and phylogenetics ==
Cadra calidella (Guen.) is a member of the family Pyralidae. A synonym is Ephestia calidella—Cadra and Ephestia are closely related and may be junior synonyms. The names are often used interchangeably, and typically both are used to reference the same organism.

== Description and identification ==
The moth is a brown-gray color. The top portion of its wings have a darker-peppered appearance, while the bottom portion is a lighter gray shade and more translucent. When the wings are folded in, the bottom portion is hidden such that the moth has a mostly dark and peppered look.

Its abdomen is thin and segmented, approximately 10 mm in length. The female is larger than the male with a wingspan of 19–23 mm, while the wingspan of the male is 17–21 mm. Meyrick - 18–22 mm. Forewings with costa more arched posteriorly, in male with costal fold small, loosely scaled; fuscous, irrorated with fuscous whitish and dark fuscous; lines pale, first posteriorly dark edged, angulated near costa, twice indented beneath, second dark-edged, strongly indented near costa; two dark fuscous transversely placed discal dots. Hindwings fuscous-whitish, termen fuscous, in male with subdorsal whitish-ochreous basal hair-tuft. Larva pinkish-whitish; dorsal line darker; spots brown; head and plate of 2 dark brown: on cork, dried figs, currants, etc.

== Distribution and habitat ==
The moth mostly presides in Mediterranean countries, although it can be found in other parts of Europe due to the transport of the carobs and dried fruits on which it feeds. It can also be found in Central Asia, Kazakhstan, Transcaucasia, Caucasus, and the western part of Russia. It thrives at temperatures above 14 °C. The optimal temperature ranges from 25–29 °C. The larva will enter diapause when temperatures have dropped below 24°, and will spend the winter months in hibernation. Its habitat range is limited by this temperature sensitivity.

== Feeding ==
Cadra calidella (Guen.) feeds on ripe carob pods and dried fruits before harvest. It will also feed on nuts and seeds. It commonly feeds on dates, thus lending to its common name, the "date moth". It is considered in Mediterranean countries, such as Cyprus, to be a storage food pest and a threat to that industry. As part of this problem, the moths have been imported to other European countries such as Britain in fruit storage crates.

During infestation, the larva will burrow a small hold, typically near the stalk of the fruit. The feces of the larva can be identified at the entrance of the hole. The fruit will appear not only smaller in size, but also discolored from a green shade to a gray-brown one. Once the larva have finished feeding, they will emerge from their feeding tunnels and begin wandering on the surface of the fruit, an indication that pupation and diapause will begin soon.

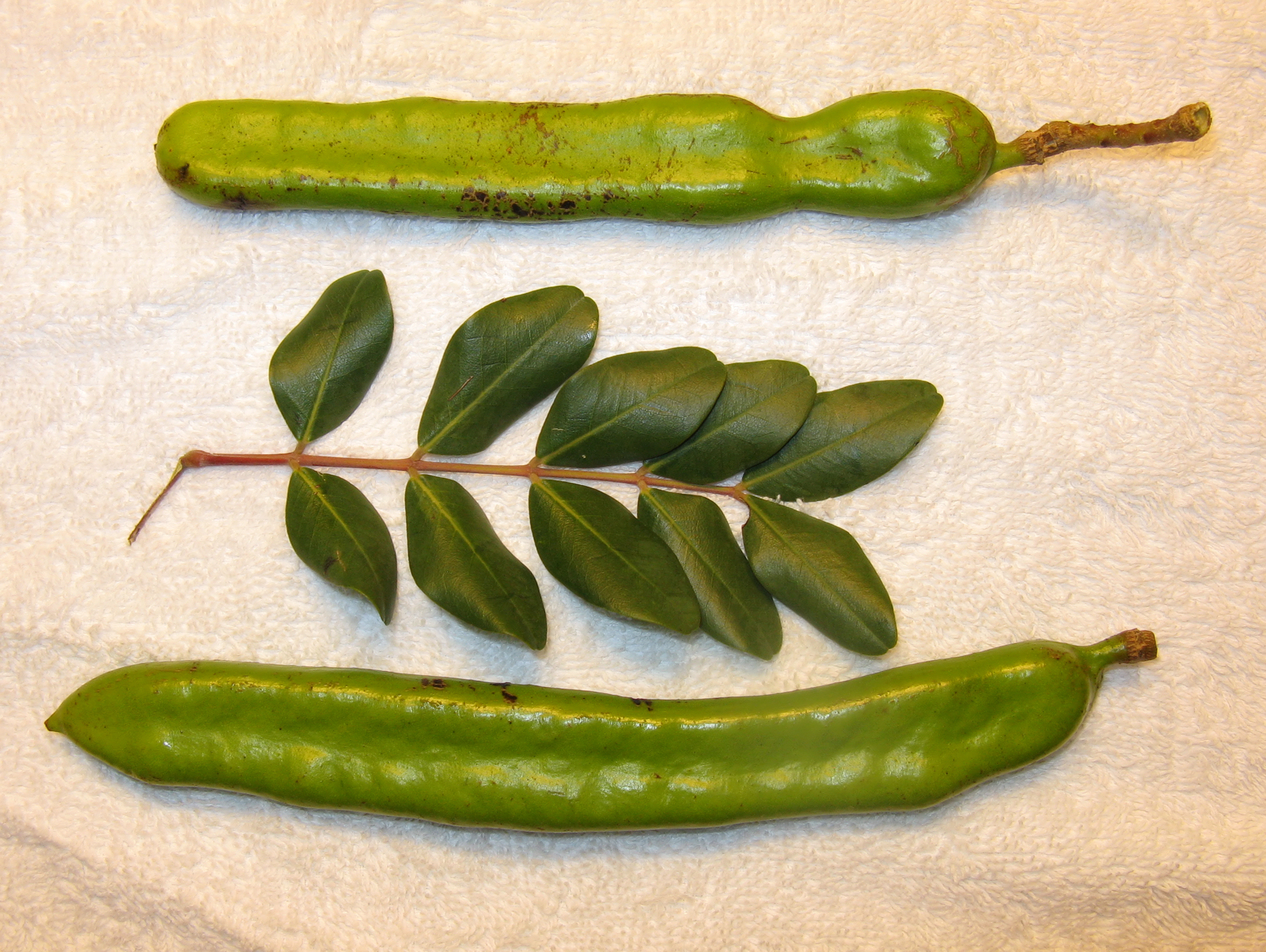
Carob pods and leaves in majorca arp

Their feeding period lasts for 20 to 21 days, during which the young larvae will tunnel into the food, lining the feeding-tunnels with thick layers of silk. While the tunnels may initially be 2 cm deep, later instar larva will tunnel deeper. In experiments they have been found to tunnel up to 6 cm deep.

== Life cycle ==
=== Eggs ===
Adult Cadra calidella lay their eggs on the surface of the dried fruit or carob before harvest. The eggs are laid in no particular fashion or intentional organization. The development following the hatching of the egg is most rapid at 30 °C.

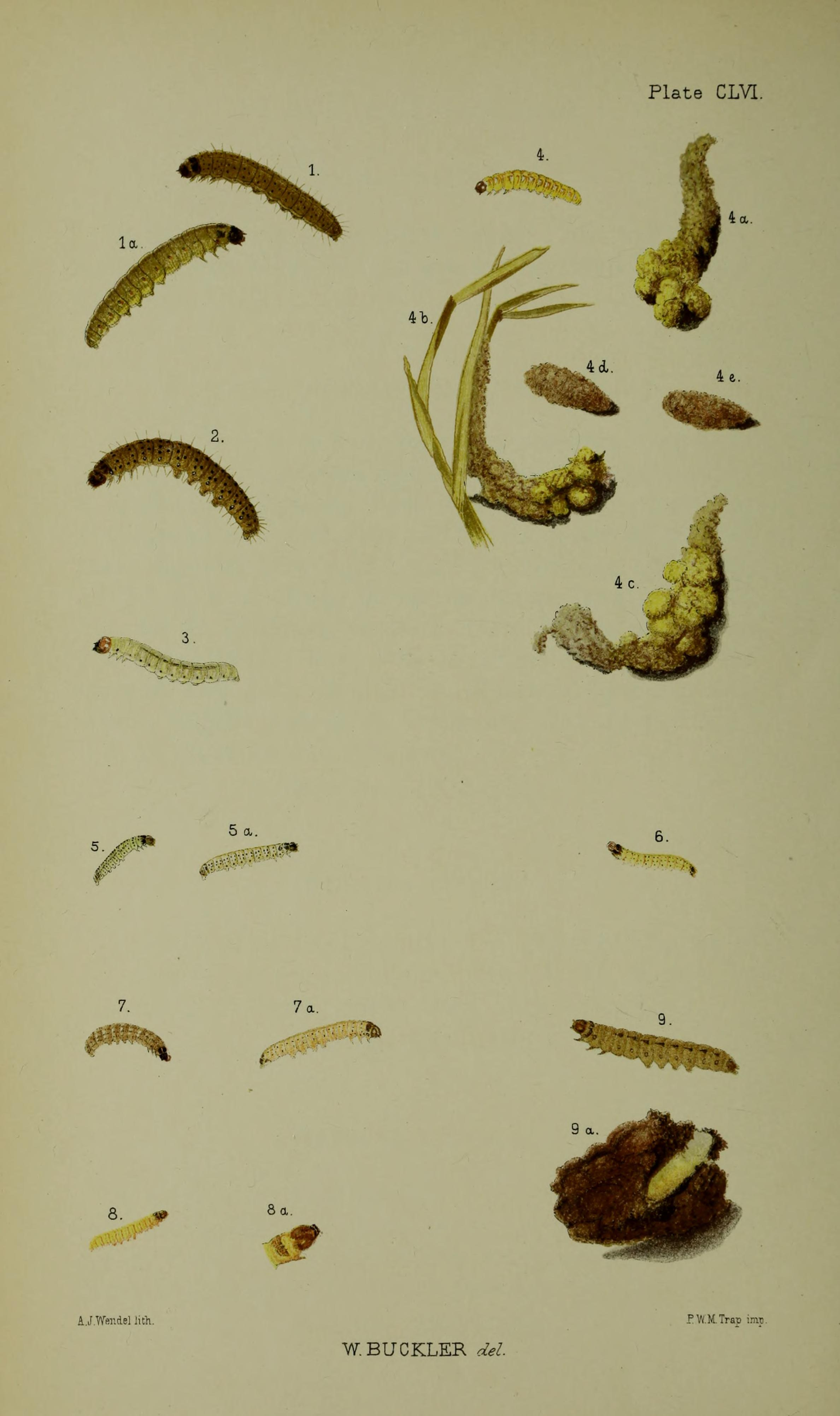
Figs7, 7a larva after final moult

=== Larvae ===
The larval period coincides with the feeding period, which typically lasts between 20 and 21 days. Following the feeding period, the larva then enters a wandering period during which the larva will move out of the food. The larvae period will last between 2 and 6 days.

=== Pre-pupa ===
After the last instar larva finds a location to begin diapause, it will spin a cocoon for itself. In laboratory experiments, the larva will wander several centimeters above the food layer before finding a satisfactory location to pupate. Once the last instar larva begins to diapause, it will spin itself a thin silk cocoon.

=== Pupa ===
The pupal period lasts typically around 5 days, although this period may vary with temperature (with the shortest time of diapause being at 30 °C). Pupal death increases in frequency as the temperature rises above 30 °C, and Franquiera (1955) observed that pupa did not enter into diapause until the temperatures have begun to dip below 24 °C. Hibernation in the cocoon occurs during the winter months, during which the appropriate temperatures are achieved for diapause.

However, there are some larva that do not diapause in the cocoon, but simply cling to the spun silk they produced during their wandering period as a larva. Additionally, these larva may occasionally shift locations, albeit for short periods of time. Laboratory experiments will assume pupation through the observation that the pupa has not moved and has not pupated at a fixed age.

=== Adult ===
The moth will hatch into an adult approximately 30 to 44 days after the eggs were initially laid.

== Hibernation and migration ==
Cadra calidella larva will hibernate during the winter months, usually between the months of September to April – this has been observed in both Portugal and Cyprus. Hibernation was observed to begin when temperatures have begun to fall below 24 °C with humidity above 60%. Due to these specific temperature conditions for moth hibernation, the species can only reproduce a limited amount of time during the year and will often only produce one or two generations during that time.

Cadra calidella does not typically migrate during winter months; instead, they will hibernate inside their cocoon. The moth will oftentimes be relocated from the Mediterranean countries to other areas in Europe through the transportation of carobs and dried fruits in the food industry.

== Mating ==
During mating, the female moth will adopt a calling position, during which she will expose her pheromone gland located underneath her abdomen to attract a male moth. This occurs during the dark period under laboratory conditions and at the dusk and dawn under natural lighting. In response to the female’s calling behavior, a male can respond in typical courtship behavior such as moving his antenna, raising his head or thorax, and fluttering his wings.

Following courting, the male will fly to the female for copulation. Mating can occur for a duration of a few minutes to over 6 hours.

An increase in male C. calidella population occurs during early April to mid-November. In laboratory studies, irradiating male moths led to a decrease in sexual competitiveness.

== Parental care ==
Copulation occurs after courtship has ended, during which the female will resume a calling position to release sex pheromones and the male will respond positively, eventually flying to the female. Copulation is more likely to occur between a male and a virgin female, as her sex pheromone is more concentrated than that of a mated female. Copulation would last from a range of a few minutes to over 6 hours, after which oviposition would begin likewise during dark conditions. Due to the temperature sensitivity of diapause, oviposition occurs only once or twice a year, producing only one or two generations in a year.

Eggs were laid on the surface of the carob or dried fruits, in no particular pattern or organized fashion.

== Physiology ==
=== Pheromone production ===
Female C. calidella will produce sex pheromones to attract male moths during mating and courtship. In the calling position, the female will expose her pheromone gland, which is between the eighth and ninth segments of the abdomen. It is in the pattern of an inverted 'V' and is covered by hairs. The hairs themselves will become more sparse to allow for both greater rates of evaporation of the pheromone into the air and greater likelihood of forming droplets. The glands are surrounded by pouch-like structures that are pulled on by round muscles, allow the female to control the exposure or hiding of the pheromone gland.

The male can the respond positively with typical courtship behavior – the likelihood of a positive response increased with increasing concentration of female sex pheromone produced. Virgin females will produce a great concentration of sex pheromone compared to females who have already mated. Males may have thus increased their reproductive fitness by mating with virgins as cued by the females' pheromone concentrations.

== Competition for resources ==
Overcrowding of C. calidella is of particular interest in studies due to the desire to limit the population sizes of the storage pests in order to minimize the damage accumulated by the moths. However, there is an optimum population density of moths, such that the highest level of food consumption was determined to be 5 larva per culture. At this level, the greatest amount of food was consumed. When the density was doubled, the amount of food consumed was halved, as competition for food increased. Mortality rates increased, likely to be attributed to hunger in individuals from food competition. Therefore, a decrease in moth populations may potentially cause greater food loss to the carob and dried fruit industry as the optimal population size is approached.

In addition to food consumption, adult emergence is also affected by population density and competition. While cultures with high densities numerically resulted in a greater magnitude of adults emerging, the ratio of emergent adults to the original population size decreased as the population density increased, such that the lowest percentage of emergent adults was at 40 larva per colony.

== Enemies ==
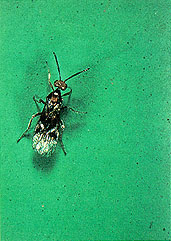
Bracon hebetor

While there are limited resources on the predation of Cadra calidella, laboratory experiments will often encounter diseased moths due to parasitism by Bacillus thuringiensis (Berliner). This bacterium is a common parasite to other moths as well. In the lab, quarantine methods and other precautions can be taken to prevent further infection of moths.

Another parasitoid, Bracon hebetor, is found to target Cadra calidella as well as other related moths. This parasitoid, along with pheromone traps, have been employed as tactics to control the reproduction of the moth due to its threat to the dried fruit industry.

The larva can be examined for signs of disease – a diseased larva will often be delayed in development, such that individuals will not emerge even after 140 days of the egg hatching.

== Interaction with humans ==
Cadra calidella is most commonly identified as a storage pest moth, primarily in Mediterranean countries where dried fruits and carobs is a larger industry. Not only do they attack the crops before the harvest, but they will also infest products in stores. In Cyprus, the moths will often infest the country's carob stores. Their prevalence as a pest has prompted much of the research that has been done on the moth.

=== Methods of pest control ===
Because the Cadra species are difficult to distinguish, many of the chemical pest control applications in the past failed to distinguish across different pests. Control programs, such as the integrated pest management (IPM) project was started by the Extension Service in Upper Galilee. The project combines pest control efforts with research, and has reached out to growers to form local and regional pest scouts. This project has led to 30–50% reductions in pesticide usage.

Much research has since followed to not only identify the major pests but also to understand their physiology and how their development changes upon certain changes. Research on Cadra calidella including changing temperature, photoperiods, humidity, gamma radiation, and parasitoids. Previous chemical control methods have largely been substituted with other pest control methods such as insect-proof screens, localized application of pesticides depending on the timeline of the moth’s life cycle, sex pheromone traps, and usage of parasitoids.

== Hosts ==
The following is a list of know hosts that C. calidella associates with.

- Capsicum annuum (chili peppers)
- Castanea sp. (Walnuts)
- Ceratonia silique (Carob tree)
- Various dried foodstuffs
- Ficus sp.
- Ficus carica (Common fig)
- Morus sp.
- Phoenix sp.
- Prunus sp.
- Prunus dulcis (Almond)
- Theobroma cacao (Cacao tree)
