= Cadra perfasciata =

Scientific classification
- Kingdom: Animalia
- Phylum: Arthropoda
- Clade: Pancrustacea
- Class: Insecta
- Order: Lepidoptera
- Family: Pyralidae
- Genus: Cadra
- Species: C. perfasciata

Binomial name
- Cadra perfasciata Horak, 1994

Species of moth

Cadra perfasciata is a species of snout moth in the tribe Phycitini. It was described by Marianne Horak in 1994. It is found in the southern arid areas of Australia, on both sides of the Nullarbor Plain (South Australia/Western Australia).

The wingspan is 14–17 mm for males and 15–18 mm for females.
