= Cadra acuta =

Scientific classification
- Kingdom: Animalia
- Phylum: Arthropoda
- Clade: Pancrustacea
- Class: Insecta
- Order: Lepidoptera
- Family: Pyralidae
- Genus: Cadra
- Species: C. acuta

Binomial name
- Cadra acuta Horak, 1994

Species of moth

Cadra acuta is a species of snout moth in the tribe Phycitini. It was described by Marianne Horak in 1994. It is found in the Northern Territory as well as on the Cape York Peninsula (Queensland) in Australia.

The wingspan is about 13 mm for males and 13–14 mm for females.
