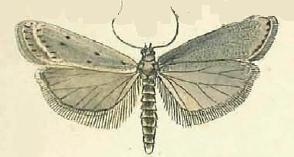

Scientific classification
- Kingdom: Animalia
- Phylum: Arthropoda
- Clade: Pancrustacea
- Class: Insecta
- Order: Lepidoptera
- Family: Pyralidae
- Genus: Cadra
- Species: C. furcatella

Binomial name
- Cadra furcatella (Herrich-Schäffer, 1849)

Synonyms
- Homoeosoma furcatella Herrich-Schäffer, 1849; Ephestia reductella Mann, 1864; Cadra furcatella albidella Roesler, 1964; Cadra furcatella asiatella Roesler, 1965; Ephestia furcatella baptella Ragonot, 1887; Ephestia interfusella Ragonot, 1901; Ephestia zosteriella Ragonot, 1887; Ephestia calonella Ragonot, 1888; Homoeosoma buckwelli D. Lucas, 1954; Ephestia constrictella Caradja, 1929; Ephestia inductella Staudinger, 1879; Ephestia irroratella Ragonot, 1887; Ephestia zenggiella Amsel, 1955; Euzophera intricata Alphéraky, 1876; Myelois afflatella Mann, 1855; Ephestia lugdunella Millière, 1874; Myelois clothella Millière, 1876; Myelois philemonella Millière, 1875; Zophodia mediterranella Millière, 1874

= Cadra furcatella =

Species of moth

Cadra furcatella is a species of moth in the family Pyralidae that was first described by Gottlieb August Wilhelm Herrich-Schäffer in 1849. It is found in southern Europe, southern Russia, Turkey, Morocco, Libya, Iran, Afghanistan, Uzbekistan, Turkmenistan, Azerbaijan and Georgia.
