= Cadra abstersella =

Scientific classification
- Kingdom: Animalia
- Phylum: Arthropoda
- Clade: Pancrustacea
- Class: Insecta
- Order: Lepidoptera
- Family: Pyralidae
- Genus: Cadra
- Species: C. abstersella

Binomial name
- Cadra abstersella (Zeller, 1847)

Synonyms
- Myelois abstersella Zeller, 1847; Ephestia bacillella Ragonot, 1887; Ephestia habenella Ragonot, 1887; Ephestia liguriella Amsel, 1954; Ephestia ragonotella Millière, 1881

Species of moth

Cadra abstersella is a species of snout moth in the genus Cadra. It was described by Zeller in 1847, and is known from Italy, France, Spain, Corsica, Croatia, Greece and Crete.
