= Cadra delattinella =

Scientific classification
- Domain: Eukaryota
- Kingdom: Animalia
- Phylum: Arthropoda
- Class: Insecta
- Order: Lepidoptera
- Family: Pyralidae
- Genus: Cadra
- Species: C. delattinella

Binomial name
- Cadra delattinella Roesler, 1965

Species of moth

Cadra delattinella is a species of snout moth in the genus Cadra. It was described by Roesler in 1965, and is known from Turkey, Greece and Crete.
