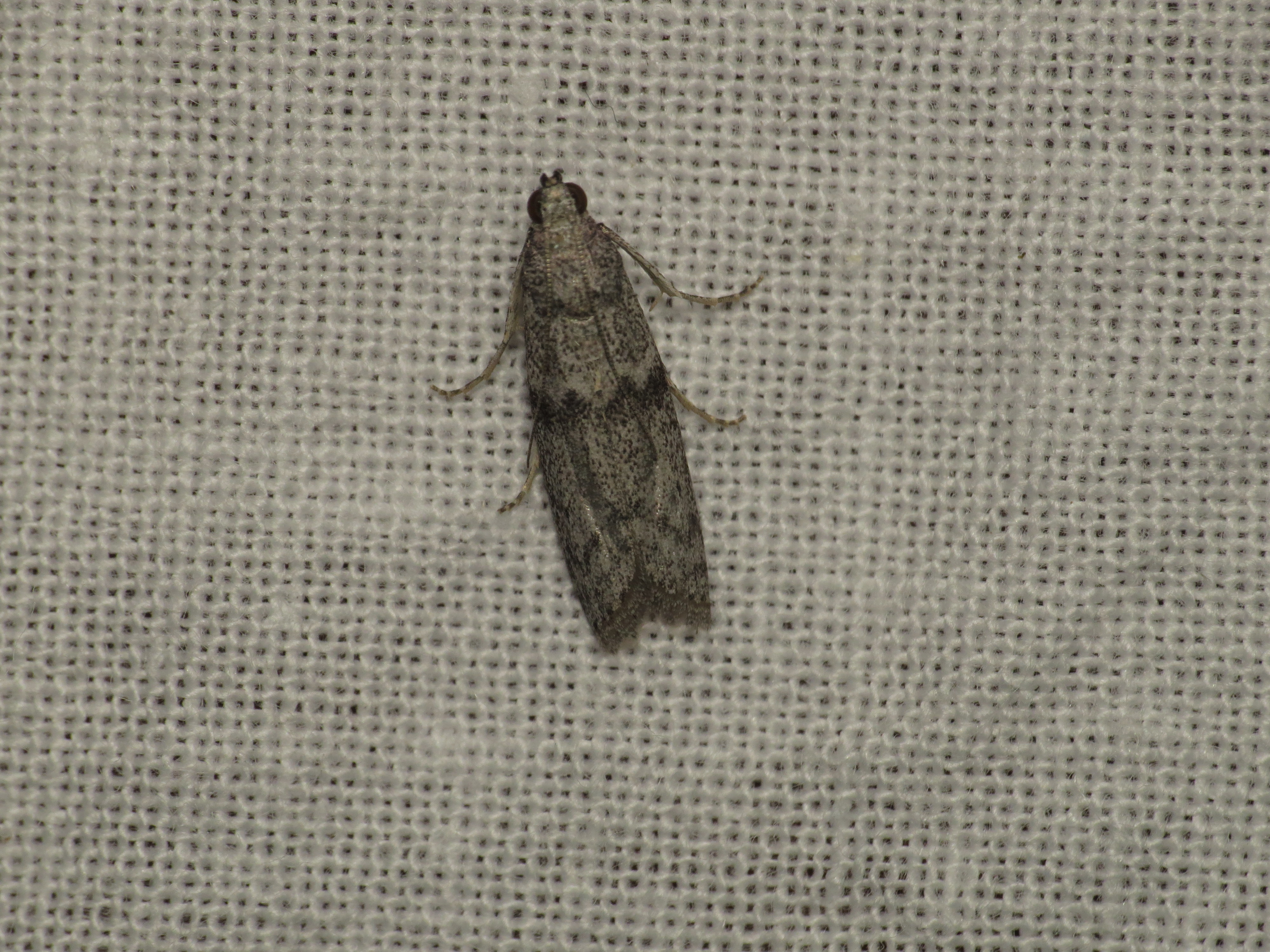

Scientific classification
- Kingdom: Animalia
- Phylum: Arthropoda
- Clade: Pancrustacea
- Class: Insecta
- Order: Lepidoptera
- Family: Pyralidae
- Genus: Cadra
- Species: C. reniformis

Binomial name
- Cadra reniformis Horak, 1994

= Cadra reniformis =

Species of moth

Cadra reniformis is a species of snout moth in the tribe Phycitini. It was described by Marianne Horak in 1994. It is found along the northern coast of Australia from Townsville (Queensland) to Darwin (Northern Territory), mainly in monsoon forest.

The wingspan is 15–17 mm for males and 11–18 mm for females.
