= Cadra corniculata =

Scientific classification
- Kingdom: Animalia
- Phylum: Arthropoda
- Clade: Pancrustacea
- Class: Insecta
- Order: Lepidoptera
- Family: Pyralidae
- Genus: Cadra
- Species: C. corniculata

Binomial name
- Cadra corniculata Horak, 1994

Species of moth

Cadra corniculata is a species of snout moth in the tribe Phycitini. It was described by Marianne Horak in 1994. It is found in Western Australia near Broome.

The wingspan is 15–18 mm for males and 14–17 mm for females.
