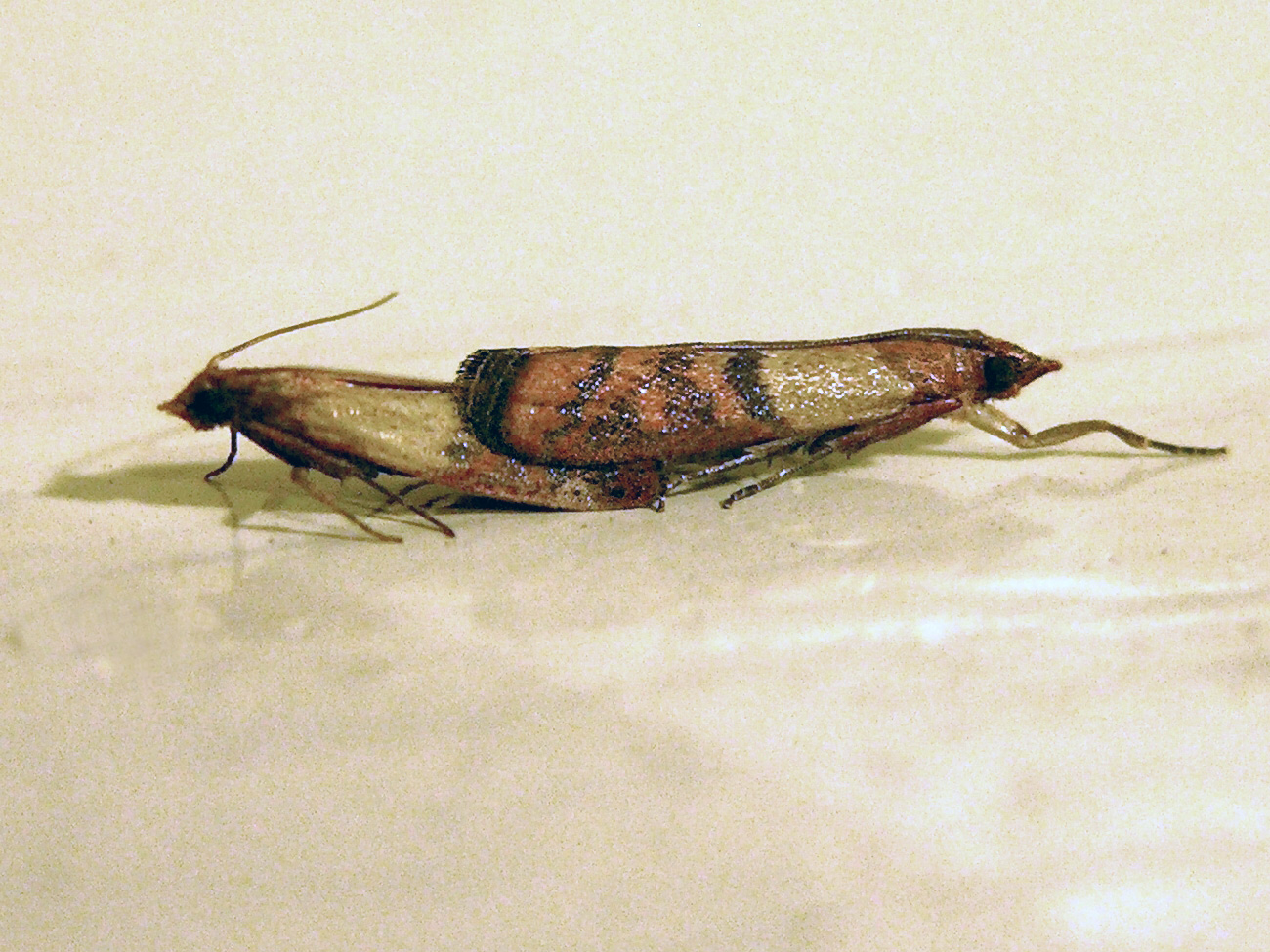
- Plodia interpunctella adults during mating

Scientific classification
- Kingdom: Animalia
- Phylum: Arthropoda
- Clade: Pancrustacea
- Class: Insecta
- Order: Lepidoptera
- Family: Pyralidae
- Subfamily: Phycitinae
- Tribe: Phycitini
- Genus: Plodia; Guenée, 1845

= Plodia =

Genus of moths

Plodia is a genus of snout moths in the subfamily Phycitinae of the family Pyralidae. The genus was erected by Achille Guenée in 1845.

== Species ==
Plodia currently comprises three species:

- Plodia dolorosa Dyar, 1919
- Plodia gloriosa Neunzig & Dow, 1993
- Plodia interpunctella (Hübner, 1810–1813)
