= Cadra rugosa =

Scientific classification
- Kingdom: Animalia
- Phylum: Arthropoda
- Clade: Pancrustacea
- Class: Insecta
- Order: Lepidoptera
- Family: Pyralidae
- Genus: Cadra
- Species: C. rugosa

Binomial name
- Cadra rugosa Horak, 1994

Species of moth

Cadra rugosa is a species of snout moth in the tribe Phycitini. It was described by Marianne Horak in 1994. It is found in the Northern Territory, in central Australia near Alice Springs.

The wingspan is 15–16 mm for males and females.
