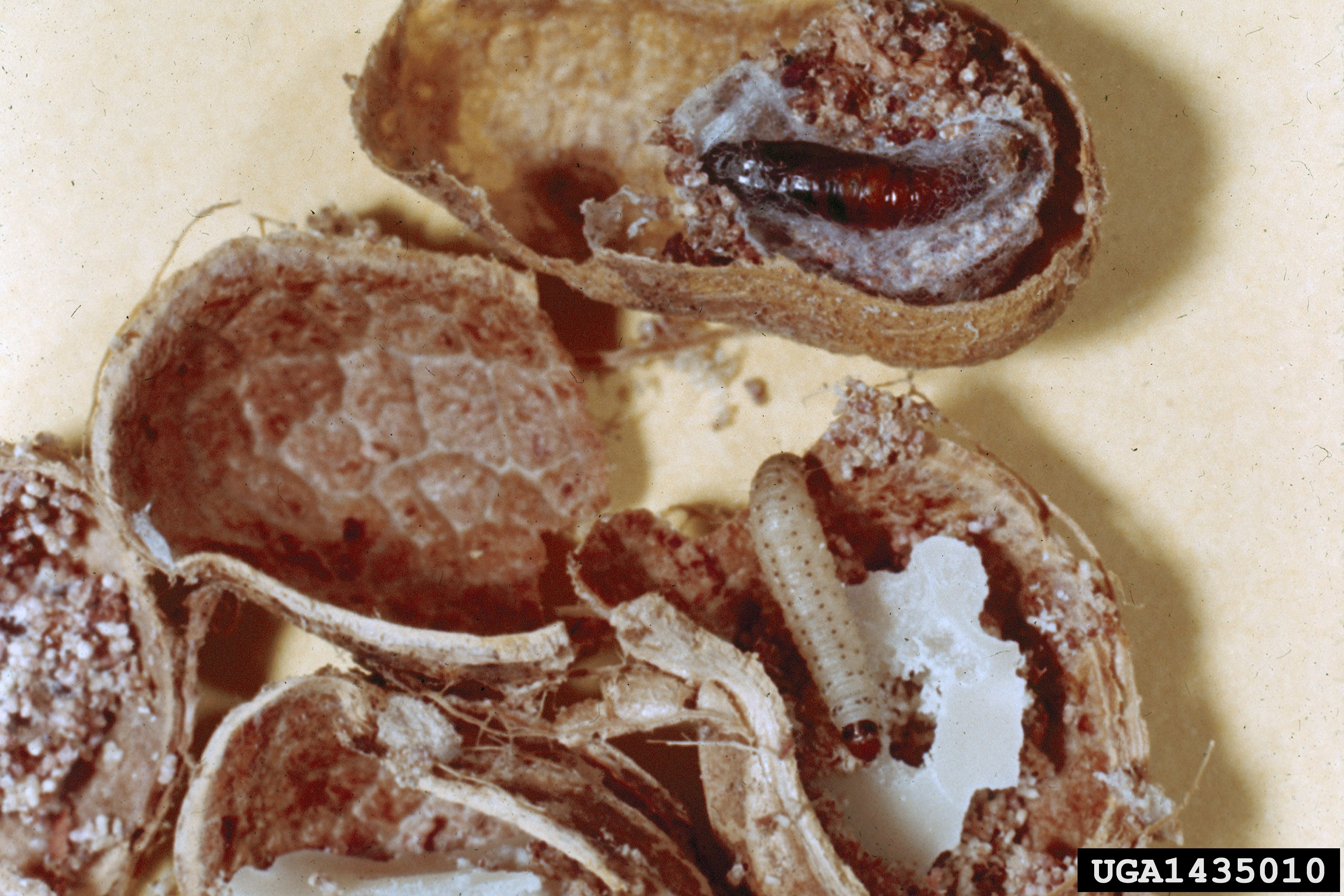
- Almond moth (C. cautella), caterpillar (below) and pupa (above) in peanut husks

Scientific classification
- Kingdom: Animalia
- Phylum: Arthropoda
- Clade: Pancrustacea
- Class: Insecta
- Order: Lepidoptera
- Family: Pyralidae
- Tribe: Phycitini
- Genus: Cadra; Walker, 1864

Species
- Several, see text

Synonyms
- Xenephestia Gozmány, 1958

= Cadra =

Genus of moths

Cadra is a genus of small moths belonging to the family Pyralidae. The genus Ephestia is closely related to Cadra and might be its senior synonym. Several of these moths are variously assigned to one or the other genus, in particular in non-entomological sources. Cadra and Ephestia belong to the huge snout moth subfamily Phycitinae, and therein to the tribe Phycitini.

Cadra species can usually be recognized by their reduced forewing venation: veins 4, 7 and 9 are missing, making for a total of nine veins in the forewing. Some members of this genus are significant pests of dry plant produce, such as seeds and nuts. The almond moth (C. cautella) is a well-known example of these.

== Species ==
Species of Cadra include:

- Cadra abstersella (Zeller, 1847)
- Cadra acuta Horak, 1994
- Cadra calidella (Guenée, 1845) – dried fruit moth, carob moth
- Cadra cautella – almond moth
- Cadra corniculata Horak, 1994
- Cadra delattinella Roesler, 1965
- Cadra figulilella – raisin moth
- Cadra furcatella (Herrich-Schäffer, 1849)
  - Cadra furcatella afflatella
  - Cadra furcatella calonella
- Cadra perfasciata Horak, 1994
- Cadra reniformis Horak, 1994
- Cadra rugosa Horak, 1994
