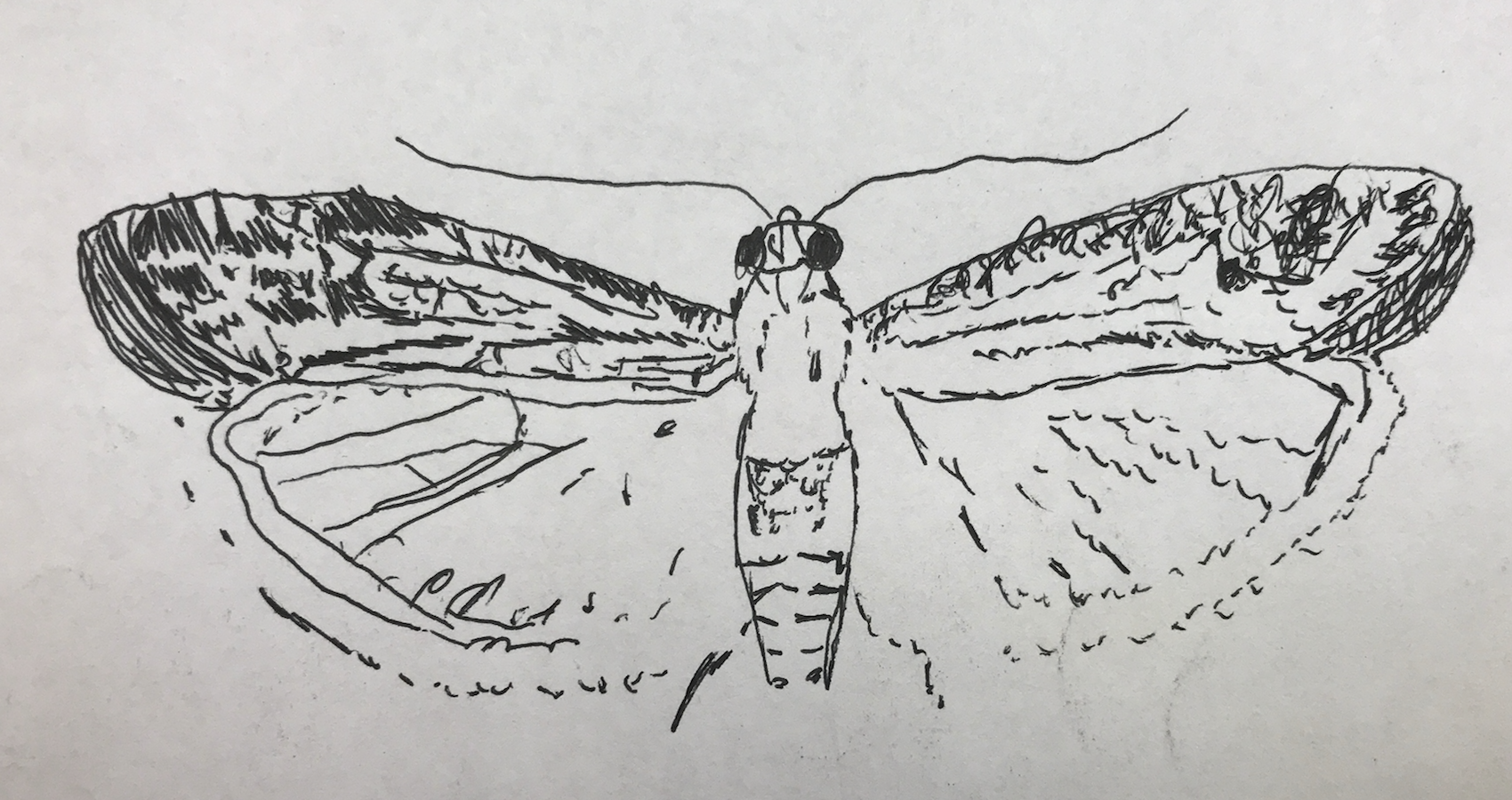

Scientific classification
- Kingdom: Animalia
- Phylum: Arthropoda
- Class: Insecta
- Order: Lepidoptera
- Family: Pyralidae
- Genus: Cadra
- Species: C. figulilella

Binomial name
- Cadra figulilella (Gregson, 1871)

Synonyms
- Ephestia figulilella Gregson, 1871; Ephestia ficulella Barrett, 1875; Cadra figulilella f. halfaella Roesler, 1966; Cadra ernestinella Turati, 1927; Cadra gypsella Ragonot, 1887; Cadra milleri Zeller, 1876; Cadra venosella Turati, 1926; Cadra halfaella Roesler, 1965

= Cadra figulilella =

Species of moth

Cadra figulilella, the raisin moth, is a moth of the family Pyralidae. The raisin moth is known most commonly as a pest that feeds on dried fruits, such as the raisin and date. It covers a range that includes much of the world, primarily situating itself in areas of California, Florida, the Eastern Mediterranean region, and some parts of Africa, Australia, and South America. The moth prefers to live in a hot, arid climate with little moisture and plentiful harvest for its larvae to feed on. Study of this species is important due to the vast amount of economic damage it causes yearly and worldwide to agriculture crops.

Adult raisin moths have a life span of 11–16 days and devote most of their resources to reproduction. Eggs are laid on or near the fruit and larvae immediately begin boring and infesting the fruit. Fumigation after harvest does not save infested fruits, as the pest has already dug into the fruit and spoiled it.

The mating process consists of pheromone release by both the male and female moths as well as many other copulatory rituals that function to prevent interspecies mating. Copulation consists of specific head bump technique paired with thrusting behavior. There is also a specific method of curling the abdomen that distinguishes this moth from the moths of other species.

This moth also displays migration behavior as well as nocturnal activity. During the start of cold winter months, the larvae of the raisin moth will move from the fruit in which they are enveloped to the top 4 inches of topsoil. It tends to be most active after 7pm, or around sundown, and then ceases activity by 5am, or before sunrise.

== Description ==
The adults of this moth species are about 1 cm long and have a brown grey complexion. Their wingspan ranges from 14–16 mm. A key element of distinction are its hindwings, which have short fringes. Reproductive structures also serve as an element of differentiation. This moth has an almost straight uncus and a long thin costal outgrowth and at almost 90° angle. Wing pattern does not serve as a differentiating element in this species as it is very similar to other species of its genus. Their body has six rows of purple-colored dots running horizontally and their head is a reddish-brown color.

Eggs are small, round, and slightly yellow-orange and creamy white in color. They tend to turn to a more subtle greenish-grey color as they mature.

== Distribution ==
The raisin moth likely got its name due to being first identified on Muscat raisins in Fresno County, California in 1928. Its population quickly increased and spread throughout the world, now claiming ubiquity in the Eastern Mediterranean region, California, Florida, and some parts of Australia, South America, and Africa. Specifically, the moth is present in regions of optimal breeding temperature and food resources. Since its rise, it first spread to the tropics and later nudged its way into cooler areas by following humans on trade routes.

== Habitat ==
Adult moths will not stay in a region that is below 15 °C or above 36 °C, which are the thresholds for their temperature tolerance. Adults will not fly at a temperature below 13 °C. The raisin moth prefers a climate that has arid, hot, clear, and rainless summers, along with mild winters.

== Food resources ==
=== Caterpillars ===
==== Host plant preferences and selection ====
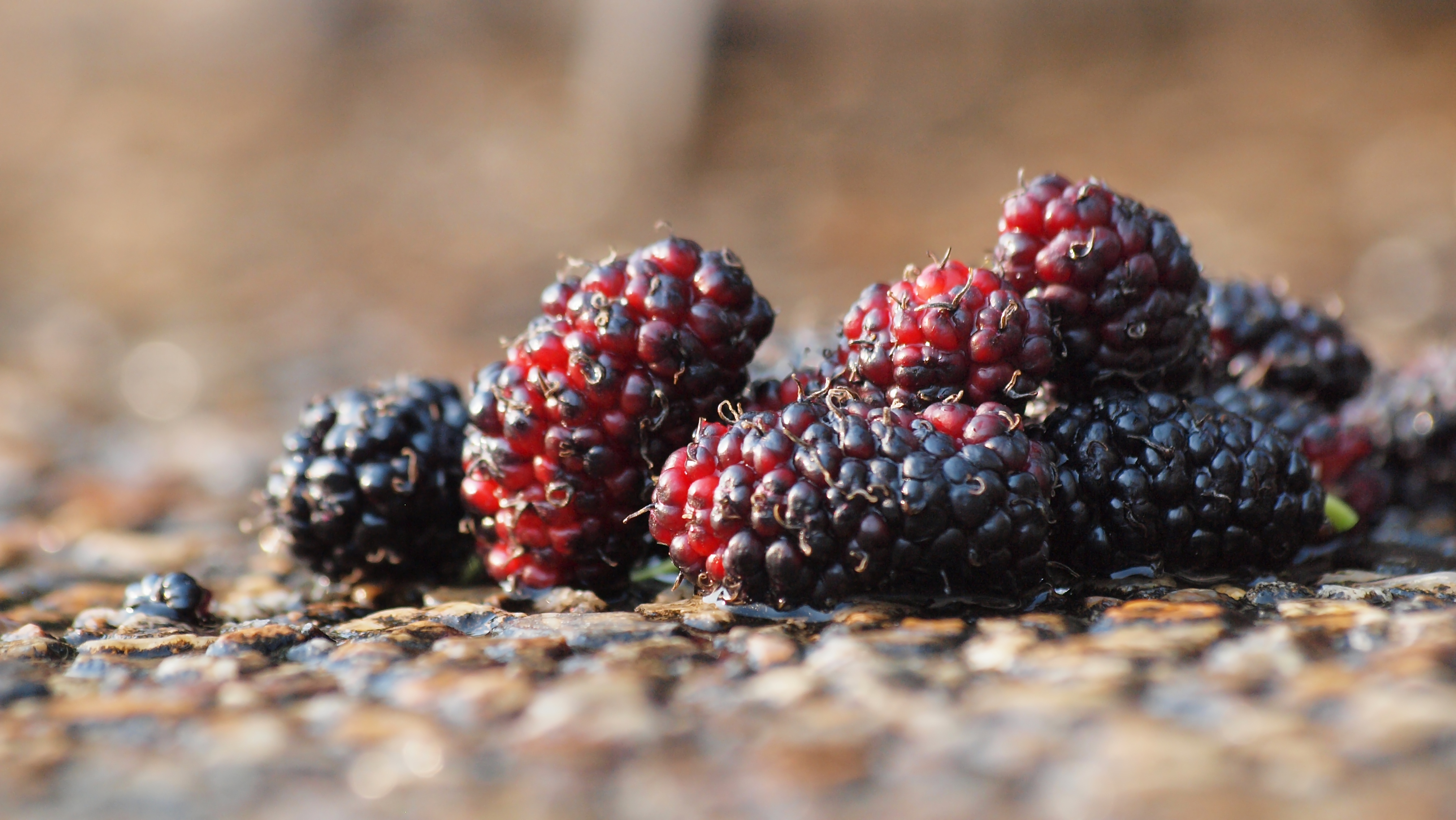
Mullberries

The raisin moth is a polyphagous insect, meaning that it feeds on a large variety of different fruits. The larvae in particular are herbivorous and prefer to feed on dry fruits on the ground or still on the plant. In particular they feed on fallen figs, ripe carob pods, grapes, cottonseed cake, cacao beans, prunes, peaches, apricots, pears, and more. In the springtime, they primarily feed on fallen mulberries because other host fruits are often scarce. However, they can be found year-round in decaying date fruit.

=== Adults ===
During this stage of the moth's life cycle, the moth will mainly consume water. They do not focus much on foraging and instead devote full resources to reproduction. This is possibly due to the very short duration of this stage.

== Life history ==
Development of one generation lasts 43 days at an optimal temperature of 28 °C.

=== Egg ===
The female raisin moth lays her fertilized eggs directly on or near the surface of the fruit of the host plant. The eggs are sticky, but are not glued down. They are laid one by one, or in small batches, and often in a star-shape. After oviposition, eggs hatch within 4 days, and approximately 75% of laid eggs will hatch successfully. Eggs are small, round, and slightly yellow-orange and creamy white in color. They tend to turn to a more subtle greenish-grey color as they mature.

=== Caterpillar ===
Upon hatching, neonatal larvae, or caterpillars, immediately begin digging into all parts of fruit. Larvae develop continuously throughout the year, living within fruits on the trees or rotting on the ground. Larval development depends on warmth, so development takes longer during winter periods. During cold winter periods, the larvae will stay in topsoil or under the loose bark of host plants and exhibit diapause, or a period of suspended development, until warmer temperatures arise.

=== Pupa ===
Pupa is the term for the moth in its cocoon phase. Pupae are web-covered and brown. The cocoon is silken and they are usually hidden on the trees or in the upper soil layers near the vine trunks. Pupal development period usually lasts about 10 days, after which the adult moth emerges from the cocoon.

=== Adult ===
Male and female moths live on average 11 and 16 days respectively. In the short period in which they are alive, adults lay 3–4 broods. The mean fertility of females is 160 eggs on the second and third nights after leaving the pupal stage and entering the adult stage. After laying her eggs, the female raisin moth does not stay to protect her eggs, instead abandoning them afterwards. The male raisin moth also plays no role in guarding or rearing its young.

== Flight habits ==
The raisin moth has been observed to exhibit nocturnal flight patterns. It tends to be inactive during the day and begin significant activity at 7pm. Activity exponentially increases until it peaks at 8pm, when it then slowly levels off and reaches inactivity at 5am. Activity during this period consists of mating, as the moths do not forage in the adult phase.

== Enemies ==
=== Predators ===
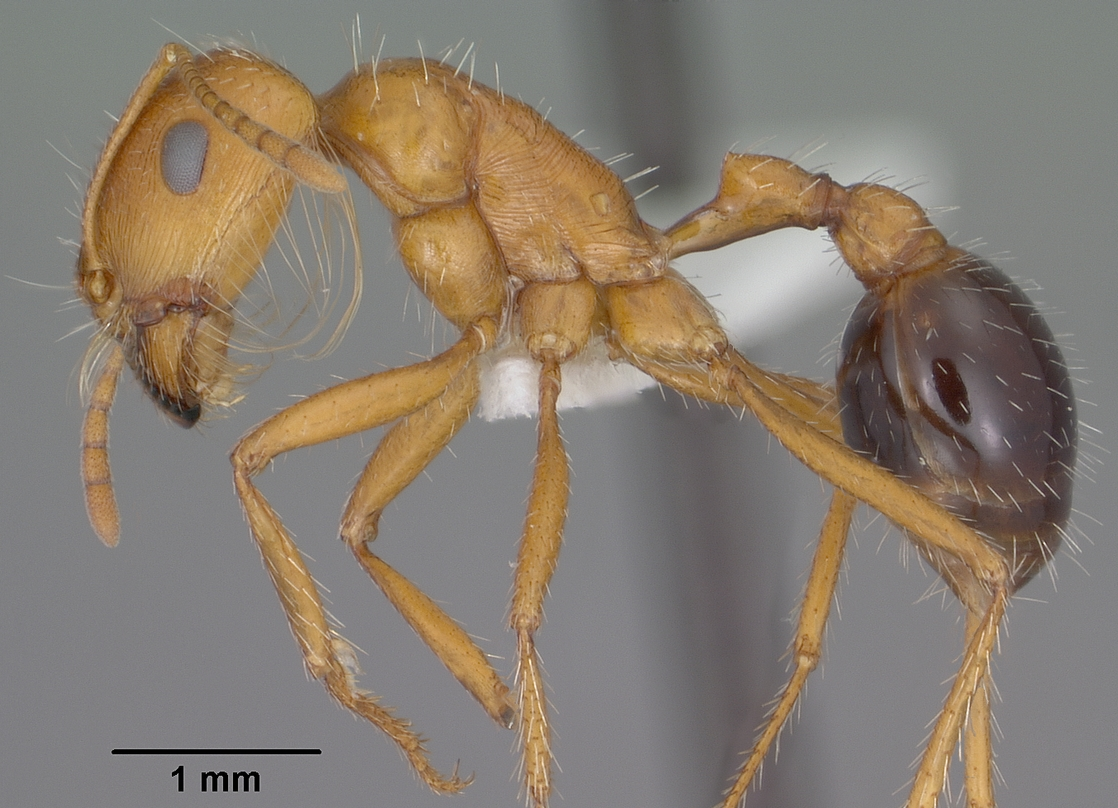
Pogonomyrmex californicus, a predator of C. figulilella

Raisin moth larvae face predation from competitors on dropped fruit. The mortality of the moth larvae in dropped fruit is higher in the presence of the fire ant Solenopsis aurea and the California harvester ant, Pogonomyrmex californicus. Both of these ants forage on dropped fruit, but will also consume the moth larvae if it is present.

=== Parasites ===
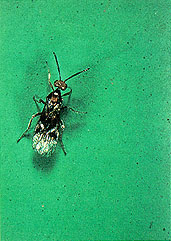
Bracon hebetor, a parasite of C. Figulilelia

Several hymenopteran parasitoids such as Venturia canescens and Habrobracon hebetor harm raisin moth larvae. Specifically, Habrobracon hebetor stings and in effect parasitizes raisin moth larvae during warm winter days when they are located under tree bark. However, this parasitoid will not affect them during warmer seasons or on host plant fruit, so it is not effective as a natural pesticide. However, it can be used to effectively parasitize the larvae during storage.

== Mating ==
=== Pheromones ===
Pheromones are chemical substances released into the environment which alter the behavior of other organisms in the same species. In terms of the raisin moth, the female begins the mating process by attracting male moths by releasing pheromones. These pheromones are quite similar to those from other moths in the Phycitinae subfamily, so elaborate courtship rituals are performed to avoid interspecies mating. Male moths also release a species specific pheromone that serves to reduce interspecies mating.

=== Courting ===
A male raisin moth finds its way to the female moth by following the pheromone trail left by the female. As the male approaches he will first curl his abdomen such that it reaches over his head. Female will turn to face him depending on direction of approach. After the male curls his abdomen, his abdominal hair-pencils are exposed. After this, the female abdomen begins to rise and male and female join at a 30-40 degree angle from the ground. Mating is initiated by a process involving a head bump followed by a thrusting action. The thrusting is fairly accurate, with a 75% success rate on the first try, followed by nearly 100% success rate after the first successful attempt. Females exhibit a post-copulatory behavior that involves performance of a drag walk with the male moth. This consists of her dragging the male moth behind her for some time. These copulatory behaviors serve to avoid courtship by males of different species.

== Interactions with humans ==
=== Pest of crop plants ===
The raisin moth is classified as a pest throughout the world. It is especially known to cause severe qualitative and quantitative losses of dates. However, its larvae cause severe crop losses to almost all dried and drying fruits, as are specified in its diet. As the larvae feed on the insides of the fruit, it becomes filled with their excrement and fine powdery residue that is produced from the boring process. This leads to the fruit being filled with contaminants, which cannot be removed by post-harvest fumigation. Infestation can begin as soon as the fruit starts to ripen on the branches. In a study conducted in Iran, it was shown that initial infestation of the date fruit was only about 1.3%, but it peaked to 11.7% in mid-September, just months after initial fruit ripening in April. In the last month of the fruit cycle, in March, it was shown that up to 80% of the fruit was infected. More recent studies have shown that infection rates can be up to 90%.

=== Deterrents to herbivory ===
To deter consumption of host plants, frequent application of chemical insecticides is often used. Mating disruption through the use of synthetic pheromone mimics is also an effective strategy and a greener alternative to pesticides. A specific pheromone, (Z,E)-9,12-tetradecadienyl acetate, also known as TDA or ZETA, belongs to many species of pyralid moths and is a male attractant. Studies using this pheromone against the raisin moth showed that it greatly confused the male raisin moths and led to a reduction in larvae production. There is also some indication that blue neon light attracts raisin moths, which could potentially be used to deter the moth from laying eggs on fruit during mating season and lead to less larvae infestation in fruits.
