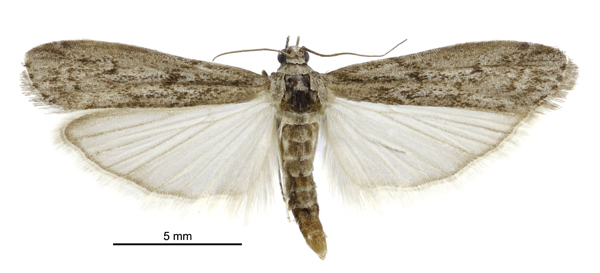

Scientific classification
- Kingdom: Animalia
- Phylum: Arthropoda
- Clade: Pancrustacea
- Class: Insecta
- Order: Lepidoptera
- Family: Pyralidae
- Genus: Ephestia
- Species: E. kuehniella

Binomial name
- Ephestia kuehniella Zeller, 1879

Synonyms
- Anagasta huchinella (lapsus); Anagasta kuchinella (lapsus); Anagasta kühmiella (lapsus); Anagasta kuehniela (lapsus); Anagasta kuehniella (Zeller, 1879); Anagasta kurhirela (lapsus); Anagasta lunella (lapsus); Ephestia fuscofasciella Ragonot, 1887; Ephestia gitonella Druce, 1896; Ephestia kühniella Zeller, 1879; Homoeosoma alba Roesler, [1965]; Homoeosoma ischnomorpha Meyrick, 1931; Homoeosoma nigra Roesler, [1965]

= Mediterranean flour moth =

Species of moth

The Mediterranean flour moth or mill moth (Ephestia kuehniella) is a moth of the family Pyralidae. It is a common pest of cereal grains, especially flour. This moth is found throughout the world, especially in countries with temperate climates. It prefers warm temperatures for more rapid development, but it can survive a wide range of temperatures.

The Mediterranean flour moth is frequently found in warm places with stored grain products, such as flour mills and bakeries, where it can breed year round. Flour mills have a particular problem with the Mediterranean flour moth because the caterpillars spin silk that clogs machinery. The most effective pest control strategy for this moth is sanitation of facilities and sealing grain containers to prevent infestation, but some pesticides may also be used.

== Description ==
Adult Mediterranean flour moths have pale gray bodies. Their forewings are gray with black zigzag markings while the hindwings are an off-white color. The wingspan is 1.5-2.6 cm. Larvae (caterpillars) are white or pink with black spots and dark heads. Pupae are reddish brown. Meyrick - Forewings fuscous, irrorated with whitish and sprinkled with dark fuscous; lines hardly paler, first posteriorly dark-edged, nearly straight, rather oblique, serrate-indented above middle and near dorsum, second strongly indented near costa, dark-edged, with darker dots on veins; two blackish transversely placed discal dots. Hindwings whitish, veins and termen fuscous, in male without whitish ochreous hair-tufts.

== Geographic range ==
This species was first recorded from specimens collected in a flour mill in Germany in June 1877. At that time it was thought to potentially have originated from North America because the mill processed a lot of American wheat and this species was previously unknown in Europe. However, within a few year of this initial record the Mediterranean flour moth had become a pest throughout the greater part of Europe, and within twenty years it had become a pest in many regions of North America, thus suggesting that perhaps it did not originate from either of these two regions. There have been various suggestions about possible regions of origin of this species, including Central America, but none of them were substantiated with specimens collected prior to 1877 so the origin of this species remains unknown, or at best uncertain. Early records include (dates at which the records were published, in chronological order): Germany: 1879; The Netherlands: 1881; Belgium: 1884; S. France: 1884; U.S.A. (N. Carolina): 1884; Chile: 1884; Great Britain (Stoney Stratford and London): 1887; Canada: 1889; Turkey: 1893; Hungary: 1896; Australia: 1896; S. Africa: 1899; Ireland: 1903; Sweden: 1905; Norway: 1906; Algeria: 1911; Switzerland: 1914; Russia: 1915; Tasmania: 1921; New Zealand:1922; Jamaica: 1922; British Guiana:1923; Libya: 1924; Italy:1928; Bulgaria: 1929. In the late 19th century, roller flour mills caused the moth to become a more widespread pest. It became a common species in Britain, North America, and Australia by 1980. The Mediterranean flour moth is now found throughout the world, though it tends to be rare in the Far East with the exception of Japan. Areas of the world with temperate climates are most likely to have infestations of the Mediterranean flour moth in their flour mills.

== Habitat ==
Mediterranean flour moths live in stored grain products. They primarily infest flour, but they can be found in a variety of cereal grains. The moth is a major pest species in flour mills, and it may also be found in bakeries and warehouses, especially in cereal products that have been left undisturbed for an extended period of time. This species particularly enjoys inhabiting flour mills and bakeries due to the heat, which allows it to breed year round.

== Food resources ==
Caterpillars feed on flour, meal, whole grains, and grain residues. Unlike other pest species of moths, E. kuehniella is almost always found in cereal grain products as opposed to other stored foods such as dried fruit. Adult Mediterranean flour moths are short-lived and do not feed.

== Life cycle ==
E. kuehniella females typically oviposit on the second night after emergence. This is because they require a few hours for the sperm to move from the bursa copulatrix to the vestibulum, where fertilization occurs. Females will then lay anywhere between 116 and 678 eggs in a food source, such as flour, to which the eggs often become attached. When the eggs hatch, larvae spin silken tubes around themselves. They spend about 40 days maturing within these tubes. Full grown larvae disperse to new locations and spin silken cocoons in which they develop into pupae. Adult moths emerge in 8–12 days.

In hot weather, the moth's entire life cycle may take no more than five to seven weeks. Though it prefers warm temperatures because it can develop more rapidly, E. kuehniella can complete development in temperatures ranging from 12 °C to about 30 °C.

E. kuehniella is also largely influenced by circadian rhythm. Adult emergence most often occurs during the day, while other adult activities, including female calling, male courtship, mating, and oviposition typically occur at night.

== Enemies ==
=== Parasites ===
==== Wolbachia ====
Mediterranean flour moths are infected by Wolbachia, a genus of bacteria that affects the reproduction of its host species. These maternally-inherited bacteria cause cytoplasmic incompatibility in E. kuehniella, which means that sperm and eggs cannot join to form a viable embryo. Infected males produce sperm that is only compatible with eggs from infected females, resulting in a decrease in fitness for uninfected females. Different strains of Wolbachia cause different levels of cytoplasmic incompatibility.

==== Nemeritis canascens ====
E. kuehniella is parasitized by Nemeritis canascens, a parasitic wasp of the family Ichneumonidae. The larvae of this wasp are endoparasites of the moth during the moth's larval phase. Larvae of Nemeritis feed on the blood of the host caterpillars. Nemeritis remains in its first instar until the host caterpillar is in its last instar of development. The parasitic larvae feed more quickly as the host caterpillar gets older, accounting for rapid development in late final-instar caterpillars and delayed development in first instar caterpillars. The changing rate of feeding in the parasite is attributed to the changing composition of the host blood on which it feeds.

== Mating ==
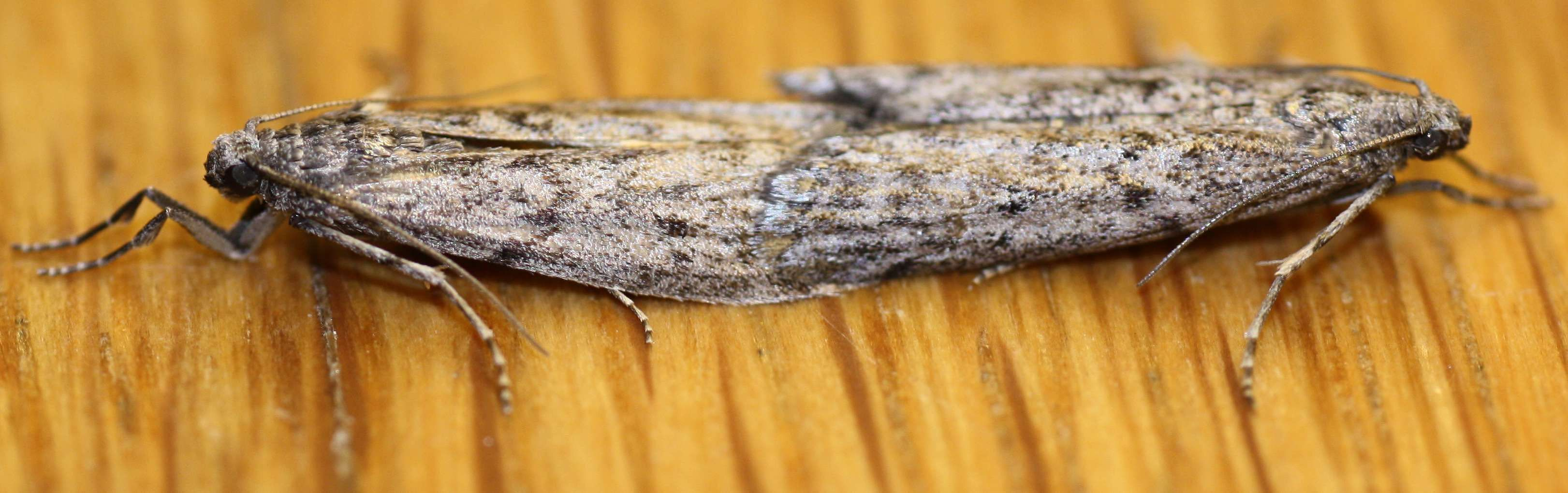
Mating

The maturation of both male and female reproductive systems occurs soon after emergence. Adult moths commonly mate on the day of emergence, which maximizes the reproductive success of females. Female calling and male courtship behaviors peak just prior to peak mating—these behaviors are useful in successful mating. The Mediterranean flour moth is a protogynous species, so females emerge significantly earlier than males. This mechanism may be used to reduce inbreeding, as females will emerge and mate with other males prior to their brothers emerging. The optimal mating time for females is on the same day they emerge, because fertility decreases when mating occurs later. Females release pheromones as a type of calling behavior to demonstrate to males when they are most fertile.

In a study of the effects of food shortage and larval crowding on male reproductive phenotype, it was found that males who emerged as adults from the population with the most crowding had smaller forewings, thorax, and head, as well as a lower body mass. It is worth noting, however, that these smaller males had larger forewings relative to their body mass. It is suggested that this may be beneficial in terms of mate searching at higher densities by promoting their dispersal.

It was also found that while mating frequency did not seem to be affected by larval density, those from higher densities had a shorter adult lifespan and produced fewer eupyrene sperm. In order to increase their reproductive success at higher densities, and thus at higher levels of sperm competition, males maintain apyrene sperm production and mate more at a higher frequency.

E. kuehniella is a polyandrous species.

== Interactions with humans ==
=== Pest of stored grains ===
Larvae will attack stores of flour or other cereal grains as a source of food, but the most damage is done when they interfere with machinery in the mills. The web-like material that larvae spin clogs machines. Grain mills have had to shut down due to this issue. They also cause damage by biting holes in silk screens used to sift flour.

=== Pest control ===
==== Prevention ====
The most effective pest control method for the Mediterranean flour moth is preventing it from infesting stored grains. This involves basic sanitation practices such as thoroughly cleaning out bins and surrounding areas of the floors and walls to remove old grains and particles of dust. Sealing all cracks and crevices in the building and grain bins can prevent moths from entering. Checking grain bins frequently (especially in warm months) for hot spots, mold, and insects can also reduce risk of infestation. Sanitation is generally the preferred strategy for preventing Mediterranean flour moth infestation.

==== Pesticides ====
Insecticides are sometimes used as well as fumigants if infestation has already occurred. Both of these pest control options involve toxic chemicals and require safety precautions to use. Methyl bromide was commonly used as a pesticide in several countries, but was later banned for environmental reasons when it was classified as an ozone depleter.

==== Biological control ====
Trichogramma parasitoids are a potential biological control for the Mediterranean flour moth, because they can kill the host in the egg stage, before it reaches the destructive larval phase. The success of Trichogramma in biological control programs is influenced by host diet and the resulting nutritional quality of the eggs. Temperature can also impact host suitability for the parasitoid.

==== Irradiation ====
Gamma radiation is another control that has been considered as an alternative to pesticide use. Low-dose irradiation has been approved by the FDA as a safe pest control measure in foods. This method is fast and not temperature dependent. Irradiation treatment can prevent adult emergence or introduce sex-linked lethal mutations that cause inherited sterility.

== Gallery ==
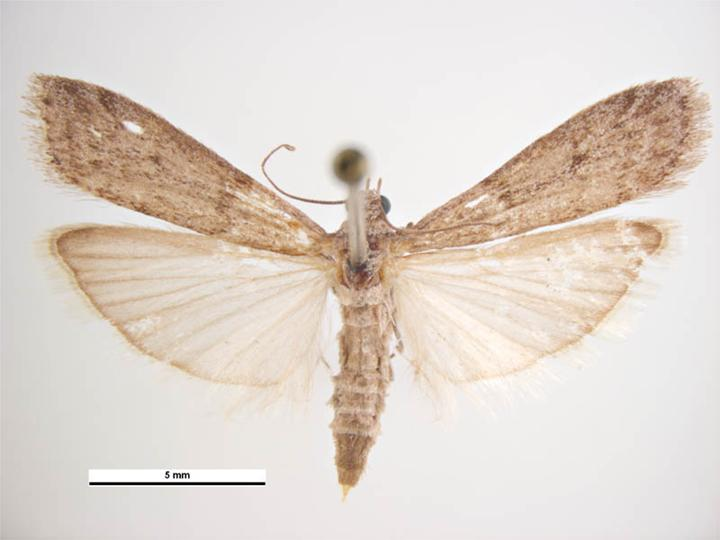
Female, dorsal view

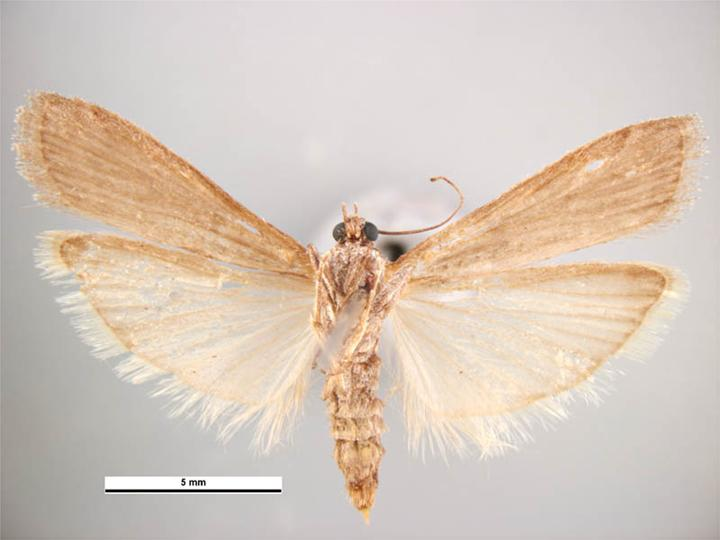
Female, ventral view

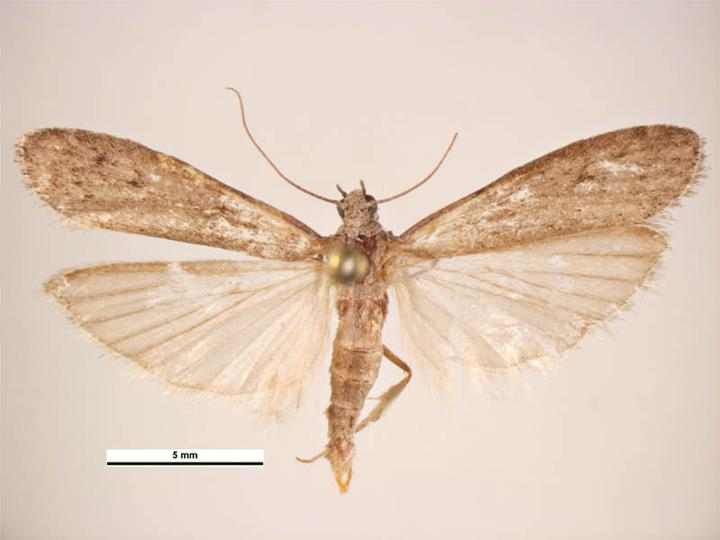
Male, dorsal view

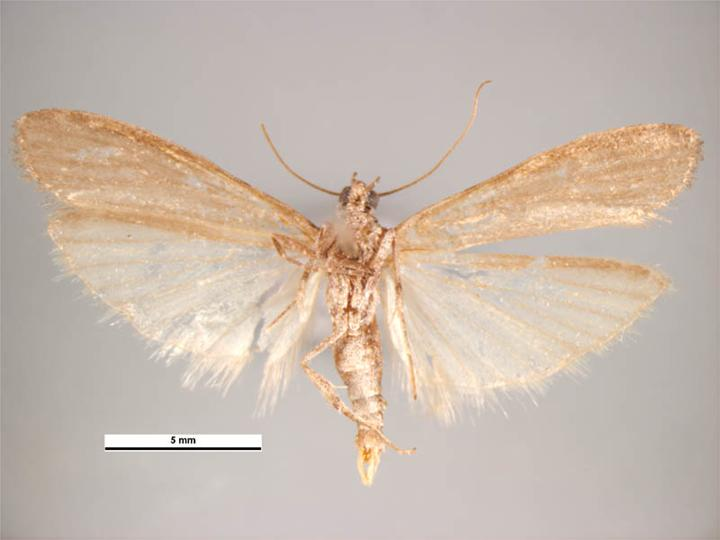
Male, ventral view

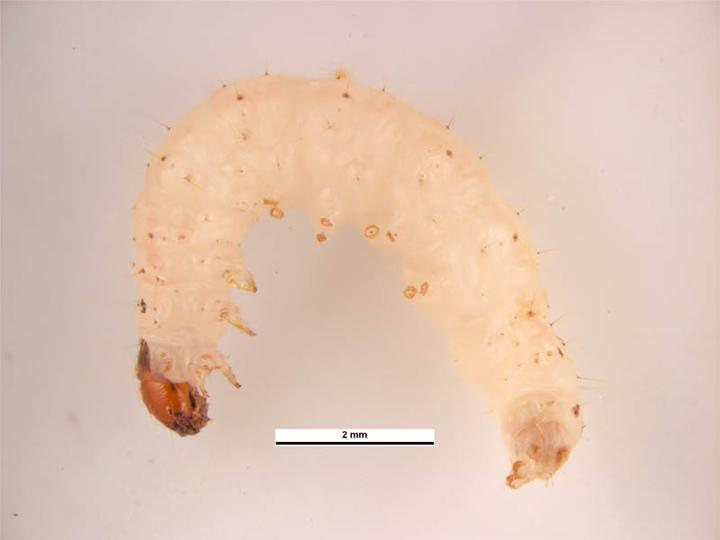
Larva

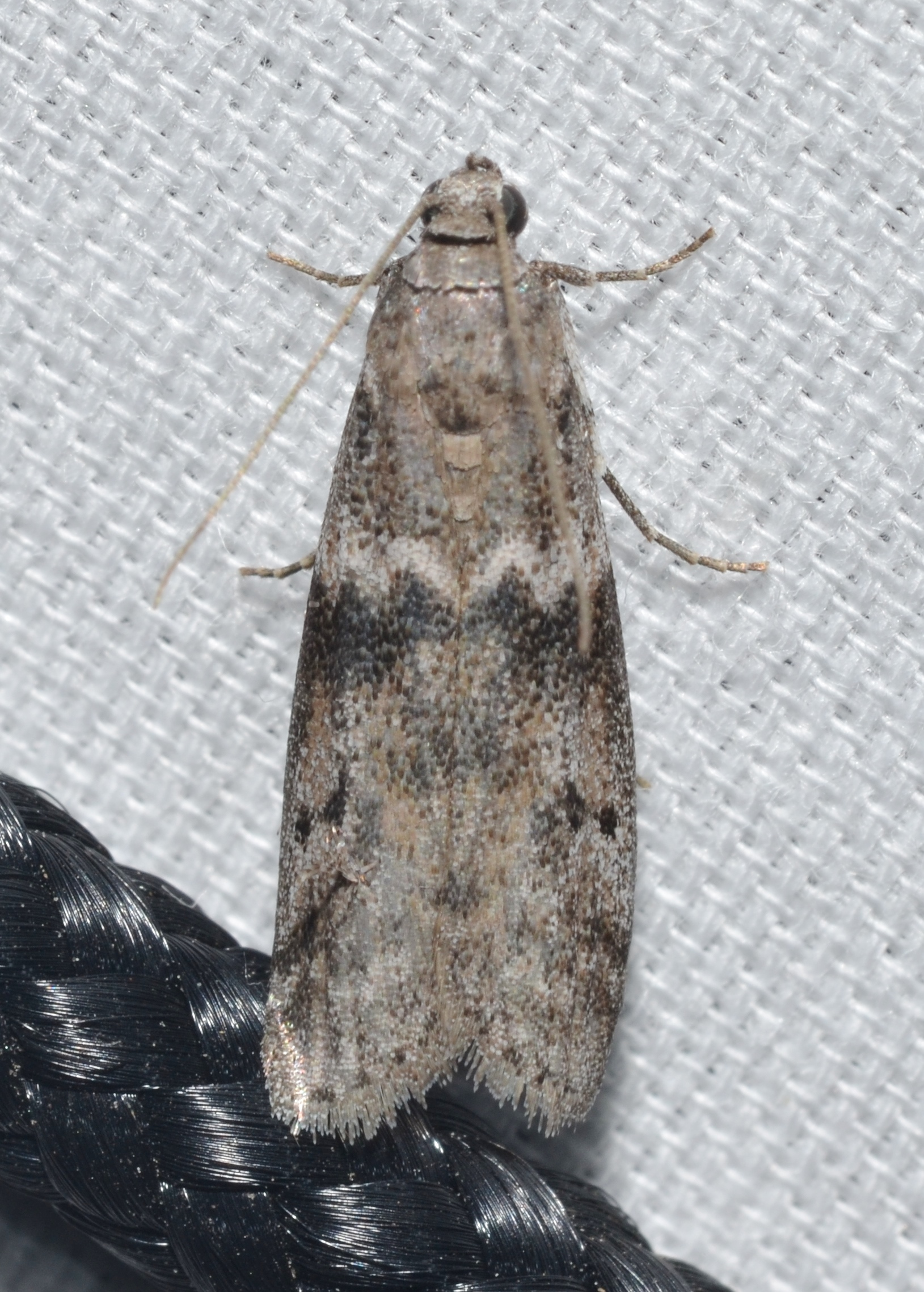
Dorsal view, wings closed
