= Ghibli =

Ghibli is the name of a hot desert wind also known as sirocco, derived, through Italian, from Libyan Arabic gibli.

Ghibli may refer to:

== Vehicles ==
- Maserati Ghibli, a model of car made by Italian auto manufacturer Maserati
- Caproni Ca.309 Ghibli, a World War II-era aeroplane
- Ghibli, an AMX International AMX fighter aircraft
- Ghibli, an ultralight disc wheelset made by Italian bicycle parts manufacturer Campagnolo
- Ghibli, the radio callsign for the Italian airline Wind Jet

== Other ==
- Studio Ghibli, Japanese animation studio; founded in 1985 by Hayao Miyazaki, Isao Takahata and Toshio Suzuki
  - Ghibli Museum, an art museum in Mitaka, Tokyo, Japan
    - Ghibli Museum Library, home video collection of Studio Ghibli films, named after the Ghibli Museum
  - Ghibli Park, an amusement park in Nagakute, Aichi, Japan
  - Ghibli Wiki or Nausicaa.net, a fan website and wiki for Studio Ghibli
  - Ghibli Clock or Ni-Tele Really Big Clock, a clock in Tokyo, designed by Miyazaki
  - Ghibli Experimental Theater On Your Mark or On Your Mark (music video), a 1995 music video directed by Hayao Miyazaki
  - Studio Ghibli filter, a controversial text-to-image filter in GPT-4o based on Studio Ghibli anime
  - Ghib Ojisan, a Japanese travel YouTuber, also known as Ghibli Ojisan after the studio
  - List of Studio Ghibli works
  - Short films by Studio Ghibli
  - Ghibli (wasp), a genus of parasitoid wasp in the family Braconidae, named after the studio
    - Ghibli miyazakii, a species of parasitoid wasp from Ecuador, named after Miyazaki
    - Ghibli totoro, a species of parasitoid wasp from Bolivia, named after studio mascot Totoro

== See also ==
- Sirocco (disambiguation)
