= Clinocentrini =

Scientific classification
- Domain: Eukaryota
- Kingdom: Animalia
- Phylum: Arthropoda
- Class: Insecta
- Order: Hymenoptera
- Family: Braconidae
- Subfamily: Rogadinae
- Tribe: Clinocentrini van Achterberg, 1991

Tribe of wasps

Clinocentrini is a tribe of parasitoid wasp in the family Braconidae. It is represented in the whole world. It is sister to Betylobraconini + Gondwanocentrini.

== Genera ==
The following genera are included:

- Anachyra van Achterberg, 1995 – Australasian
- Artocella van Achterberg, 1980 – Palearctic
- Clinocentrus Haliday, 1833 – World
- Confusocentrus Quicke & Butcher, 2011 – Oriental
- Kerevata Belokobylskij, 1999 – Australasian
- Tebennotoma Enderlein, 1912 – Old World
