= Phycita diaphana =

Scientific classification
- Domain: Eukaryota
- Kingdom: Animalia
- Phylum: Arthropoda
- Class: Insecta
- Order: Lepidoptera
- Family: Pyralidae
- Genus: Phycita
- Species: P. diaphana

Binomial name
- Phycita diaphana (Staudinger, 1870)

Synonyms
- Nephopterix diaphana Staudinger, 1870

Species of moth

Phycita diaphana is a species of snout moth. It is found in Portugal, Spain, Greece, Iraq, Egypt, Syria, Madagascar, Mauritius, Réunion, Yemen, Western Sahara and Israel.

== Description ==
The wingspan is 23–26 mm.

== Biology ==
Phycita diaphana is a common, invasive pest of Ricinus communis (Euphorbiaceae) throughout the Mediterranean region. In addition to R. communis, Ph. diaphana larvae are also found feeding on Populus euphranica Oliv. (Salicaceae) and Chrozophora tintoria (L.) (= verbascifolia (Willd.)) (Euphorbiaceae). Yelicones iranus (Fischer, 1963) (Hymenoptera: Braconidae: Rogadinae) has been reported as a parasitoid of caterpillars of Phycita diaphana in Israel.
