= Facitorini =

Scientific classification
- Domain: Eukaryota
- Kingdom: Animalia
- Phylum: Arthropoda
- Class: Insecta
- Order: Hymenoptera
- Family: Braconidae
- Subfamily: Rogadinae
- Tribe: Facitorini van Achterberg, 1995

Type genus
- Facitorus van Achterberg, 1995

Tribe of wasps

Facitorini is a tribe of parasitoid wasp in the family Braconidae. It is represented across the world. It is the sister tribe to Yeliconini and Aleiodini.

== Genera ==
The following genera are included:

- Conobregma van Achterberg, 1995 – World
- Facitorus van Achterberg, 1995 – Oriental
- Jannya van Achterberg, 1995 – Neotropical
