= Stiropiini =

Scientific classification
- Kingdom: Animalia
- Phylum: Arthropoda
- Class: Insecta
- Order: Hymenoptera
- Family: Braconidae
- Subfamily: Rogadinae
- Tribe: Stiropiini van Achterberg, 1993

Tribe of wasps

Stiropiini is a tribe of parasitoid wasp in the family Braconidae. It is represented across the New World. It is the second tribe to diverge within the subfamily Rogadinae. Rogadini was the first to diverge.

== Genera ==
The tribe contains the following three genera:

- Choreborogas Whitfield, 1990 – New World
- Polystenidea Viereck, 1911 – New World
- Stiropius Cameron, 1911 – New World
