= List of Yelicones species =

This is a list of 127 species in Yelicones, a genus of wasp in the family Braconidae.

== Yelicones species ==
- Yelicones affinis Quicke, Austin & Chishti, 1998^{c g}
- Yelicones africanus Quicke & Chishti, 1997^{c g}
- Yelicones anchanae Areekul & Quicke, 2006^{c g}
- Yelicones anitae Areekul & Quicke, 2006^{c g}
- Yelicones arizonus Quicke, Chishti & Basibuyuk, 1996^{c g}
- Yelicones artitus Areekul & Quicke, 2006^{c g}
- Yelicones ateronotus Areekul & Quicke, 2006^{c g}
- Yelicones barroci Quicke, Chishti & Basibuyuk, 1996^{c g}
- Yelicones bello Areekul & Quicke, 2006^{c g}
- Yelicones belokobylskiji Quicke, Chishti & Chen, 1997^{c g}
- Yelicones belshawi Areekul & Quicke, 2006^{c g}
- Yelicones bentoni Areekul & Quicke, 2006^{c g}
- Yelicones bicoloripes Quicke, Chishti & Basibuyuk, 1996^{c g}
- Yelicones boliviensis Areekul & Quicke, 2006^{c g}
- Yelicones braziliensis Areekul & Quicke, 2006^{c g}
- Yelicones buloloensis Quicke, Austin & Chishti, 1998^{c g}
- Yelicones butcheri Areekul & Quicke, 2006^{c g}
- Yelicones cameroni Szepligeti, 1902^{c g}
- Yelicones canalensis Quicke, Chishti & Basibuyuk, 1996^{c g}
- Yelicones cardaleae Quicke, Austin & Chishti, 1998^{c g}
- Yelicones colombiensis Areekul & Quicke, 2006^{c g}
- Yelicones concavus Areekul & Quicke, 2006^{c g}
- Yelicones confusus Quicke, Chishti & Basibuyuk, 1996^{c g}
- Yelicones contractus Papp, 1991^{c g}
- Yelicones cooki Areekul & Quicke, 2006^{c g}
- Yelicones crassicornis Cameron, 1887^{c g}
- Yelicones crassipes Szepligeti, 1904^{c g}
- Yelicones crassitarsis (Cameron, 1911)^{c g}
- Yelicones crica Quicke, Chishti & Basibuyuk, 1996^{c g}
- Yelicones crurobicolor Areekul & Quicke, 2006^{c g}
- Yelicones delicatus (Cresson, 1872)^{c g b}
- Yelicones desertus Quicke, Austin & Chishti, 1998^{c g}
- Yelicones diasus Areekul & Quicke, 2006^{c g}
- Yelicones divaricatus Papp, 1992^{c g}
- Yelicones doyeni Quicke, Austin & Chishti, 1998^{c g}
- Yelicones elegans Papp, 1992^{c g}
- Yelicones fijiensis Quicke, Austin & Chishti, 1998^{c g}
- Yelicones fisheri Areekul & Quicke, 2004^{c g}
- Yelicones fittoni Quicke, Austin & Chishti, 1998^{c g}
- Yelicones flavus Chen & Quicke, 1997^{c g}
- Yelicones gavinbroadi Areekul & Quicke, 2006^{c g}
- Yelicones geminus Areekul & Quicke, 2006^{c g}
- Yelicones gessi Quicke & Chishti, 1997^{c g}
- Yelicones girardozae Areekul & Quicke, 2006^{c g}
- Yelicones glabromaculatus Belokobylskij, 1993^{c g}
- Yelicones gracilus Areekul & Quicke, 2006^{c g}
- Yelicones hansoni Areekul & Quicke, 2006^{c g}
- Yelicones howdeni Quicke, Chishti & Basibuyuk, 1996^{c g}
- Yelicones huggerti Areekul & Quicke, 2006^{c g}
- Yelicones infuriatus Quicke, Chishti & Basibuyuk, 1996^{c g}
- Yelicones iranus (Fischer, 1963)^{c g}
- Yelicones joaquimi Areekul & Quicke, 2006^{c g}
- Yelicones kibaleiensis Areekul & Quicke, 2004^{c g}
- Yelicones koreanus Papp, 1985^{c g}
- Yelicones kraaijeveldi Areekul & Quicke, 2006^{c g}
- Yelicones levelus Areekul & Quicke, 2006^{c g}
- Yelicones longiantennatus Areekul & Quicke, 2006^{c g}
- Yelicones longigena Areekul & Quicke, 2006^{c g}
- Yelicones longivena Quicke, Chishti & Chen, 1997^{c g}
- Yelicones longulus Quicke, Chishti & Basibuyuk, 1996^{c g}
- Yelicones luridus Papp, 1991^{c g}
- Yelicones luteus Quicke, Chishti & Basibuyuk, 1996^{c g}
- Yelicones maculatus Papp, 1985^{c g}
- Yelicones magnus Areekul & Quicke, 2006^{c g}
- Yelicones manzarii Areekul & Quicke, 2006^{c g}
- Yelicones marutus Areekul & Quicke, 2006^{c g}
- Yelicones mayi Areekul & Quicke, 2006^{c g}
- Yelicones medius Areekul & Quicke, 2006^{c g}
- Yelicones melanocephalus Cameron, 1887^{c g}
- Yelicones minutus Quicke & Chishti, 1997^{c g}
- Yelicones napo Areekul & Quicke, 2006^{c g}
- Yelicones natsanae Areekul & Quicke, 2006^{c g}
- Yelicones naumanni Quicke, Austin & Chishti, 1998^{c g}
- Yelicones nigridorsum Quicke, Austin & Chishti, 1998^{c g}
- Yelicones nigrigaster Quicke, Chishti & Basibuyuk, 1996^{c g}
- Yelicones nigroantennatus Areekul & Quicke, 2006^{c g}
- Yelicones nigrocaputus Areekul & Quicke, 2006^{c g}
- Yelicones nigromaculatus Quicke & Chishti, 1997^{c g}
- Yelicones nigromarginatus Quicke & Kruft, 1995^{c g b}
- Yelicones nipponensis Togashi, 1980^{c g}
- Yelicones ormei Areekul & Quicke, 2006^{c g}
- Yelicones panameus Quicke, Chishti & Basibuyuk, 1996^{c g}
- Yelicones pappi Quicke & Chishti, 1997^{c g}
- Yelicones paradoxus (Fischer, 1961)^{c g}
- Yelicones paso Areekul & Quicke, 2006^{c g}
- Yelicones pennapallidus Areekul & Quicke, 2006^{c g}
- Yelicones pennapunctum Areekul & Quicke, 2006^{c g}
- Yelicones pennatrum Areekul & Quicke, 2006^{c g}
- Yelicones pennoexemplarus Areekul & Quicke, 2006^{c g}
- Yelicones peruensis Areekul & Quicke, 2006^{c g}
- Yelicones pilops Quicke & Kruft, 1995^{c g}
- Yelicones plaumanni Areekul & Quicke, 2006^{c g}
- Yelicones plenus Areekul & Quicke, 2006^{c g}
- Yelicones pocsi Papp, 1991^{c g}
- Yelicones polaszeki Areekul & Quicke, 2006^{c g}
- Yelicones publicus Areekul & Quicke, 2006^{c g}
- Yelicones pulawskii Areekul & Quicke, 2006^{c g}
- Yelicones pulcherus Areekul & Quicke, 2006^{c g}
- Yelicones quarterus Areekul & Quicke, 2006^{c g}
- Yelicones ramosi Areekul & Quicke, 2006^{c g}
- Yelicones samaesanensis ^{g}
- Yelicones sangvornae Areekul & Quicke, 2006^{c g}
- Yelicones satoshii Areekul & Quicke, 2006^{c g}
- Yelicones scutellaris Quicke, Austin & Chishti, 1998^{c g}
- Yelicones setosus Quicke, Chishti & Basibuyuk, 1996^{c g}
- Yelicones shawi Quicke, Austin & Chishti, 1998^{c g}
- Yelicones siamensis Areekul & Quicke, 2002^{c g}
- Yelicones spectabilis Areekul & Quicke, 2004^{c g}
- Yelicones spurcus Areekul & Quicke, 2006^{c g}
- Yelicones sumatranus (Fischer, 1962)^{c}
- Yelicones surinamensis Areekul & Quicke, 2006^{c g}
- Yelicones tavaresi Areekul & Quicke, 2006^{c g}
- Yelicones theinsrii Areekul & Quicke, 2006^{c g}
- Yelicones tricolor Quicke, Chishti & Basibuyuk, 1996^{c g}
- Yelicones usae Areekul & Quicke, 2006^{c g}
- Yelicones usanae Areekul & Quicke, 2006^{c g}
- Yelicones variegatus Areekul & Quicke, 2004^{c g}
- Yelicones vespapulcher Areekul & Quicke, 2006^{c g}
- Yelicones vestigium Areekul & Quicke, 2006^{c g}
- Yelicones vilawanae Areekul & Quicke, 2006^{c g}
- Yelicones violaceipennis Cameron, 1887^{c g}
- Yelicones vojnitsi Papp, 1992^{c g}
- Yelicones vulgaris Quicke, Austin & Chishti, 1998^{c g}
- Yelicones woldai Quicke, Chishti & Basibuyuk, 1996^{c g}
- Yelicones wui Chen & He, 1995^{c g}
- Yelicones zaldivari Areekul & Quicke, 2006^{c g}
- Yelicones zitanae Areekul & Quicke, 2006^{c g}

Data sources: i = ITIS, c = Catalogue of Life, g = GBIF, b = Bugguide.net
