= Aleiodes tashimai =

Scientific classification
- Domain: Eukaryota
- Kingdom: Animalia
- Phylum: Arthropoda
- Class: Insecta
- Order: Hymenoptera
- Family: Braconidae
- Genus: Aleiodes
- Species: A. tashimai

Binomial name
- Aleiodes tashimai (Kusigemati, 1983)

Species of wasp

Aleiodes tashimai is a species of parasitoid wasp from Japan. It was first described by Kanetosi Kusigemati in 1983 as Rogas tashimai. It is a parasitoid of Sbopula epiorrhoe.
