= Phycita nodicornella =

Scientific classification
- Kingdom: Animalia
- Phylum: Arthropoda
- Class: Insecta
- Order: Lepidoptera
- Family: Pyralidae
- Genus: Phycita
- Species: P. nodicornella

Binomial name
- Phycita nodicornella Ragonot, 1888

Species of moth

Phycita nodicornella is a moth of the family Pyralidae first described by Émile Louis Ragonot in 1888. It is found in Sri Lanka.
