= Phycita atrisquamella =

Scientific classification
- Kingdom: Animalia
- Phylum: Arthropoda
- Class: Insecta
- Order: Lepidoptera
- Family: Pyralidae
- Genus: Phycita
- Species: P. atrisquamella

Binomial name
- Phycita atrisquamella (Hampson, 1901)

Synonyms
- Ptyobathra atrisquamella Hampson, 1901

Species of moth

Phycita atrisquamella is a moth of the family Pyralidae first described by George Hampson in 1901. It is found in Australia and probably in Sri Lanka.
