= Phycita coronatella =

Scientific classification
- Kingdom: Animalia
- Phylum: Arthropoda
- Class: Insecta
- Order: Lepidoptera
- Family: Pyralidae
- Genus: Phycita
- Species: P. coronatella

Binomial name
- Phycita coronatella (Guenée, 1845)

Synonyms
- Phycis coronatella Guenée, 1845; Phycis arnoldella Rougemont, 1913

Species of moth

Phycita coronatella is a species of snout moth. It is found in Spain, France, Switzerland, on the Balkan Peninsula and in Turkey.
