= Ghibli miyazakii =

Scientific classification
- Kingdom: Animalia
- Phylum: Arthropoda
- Clade: Pancrustacea
- Class: Insecta
- Order: Hymenoptera
- Family: Braconidae
- Genus: Ghibli
- Species: G. miyazakii

Binomial name
- Ghibli miyazakii Shimbori & Zaldívar-Riverón, 2024

Species of wasp

Ghibli miyazakii is a species of parasitoid wasp in the family Braconidae. It is only known from Ecuador.

== Description ==
The species is described based on a single specimen, a female. It is overall brownish in color. The body length is 3.1 mm (0.12 in). It can be distinguished from G. totoro by having a ridge running down the middle of the face (complete mid-longitudinal ridge).

== Etymology ==
The specific epithet "miyazakii" is a tribute to Hayao Miyazaki, a Japanese animator.
