= Soraya venus =

Scientific classification
- Domain: Eukaryota
- Kingdom: Animalia
- Phylum: Arthropoda
- Class: Insecta
- Order: Hymenoptera
- Family: Braconidae
- Genus: Soraya
- Species: S. venus

Binomial name
- Soraya venus Shimbori & Zaldívar-Riverón, 2024

Species of wasp

Soraya venus is a species of parasitoid wasp in the family Braconidae. It can be found in Brazil.

== Description ==
It was described based on two specimens, a male and a female. The species is overall brown with light bands across the body, a light head and light legs. The body length of the male is 2.3 mm (0.09 in) and the body length of the female is 2.7 mm (0.11 in). It can be distinguished from S. alencarae by its incomplete occipital carina, which means that the ridge running at the margins on the back of the head do not connect in the middle at the top. In S. alencarae, these ridges do connect. Another way to distinguish them is by their color. S. alencarae has a single light band over the metasoma.

== Etymology ==
The specific epithet is based on both the Roman deity and the planet.
