= Aleiodes coxalis =

Scientific classification
- Domain: Eukaryota
- Kingdom: Animalia
- Phylum: Arthropoda
- Class: Insecta
- Order: Hymenoptera
- Family: Braconidae
- Genus: Aleiodes
- Species: A. coxalis

Binomial name
- Aleiodes coxalis (Spinola, 1808)

Synonyms
- Aleiodes kolthoffi (Fahringer, 1929); Aleiodes nunbergi (Noskiewicz, 1956); Aleiodes tristis (Wesmael, 1838)

Species of wasp

Aleiodes coxalis is a species of parasitoid wasp belonging to the family Braconidae. It was first described by Maximilian Spinola in 1808 as Bracon coxalis. It is found in the Palearctic region.
