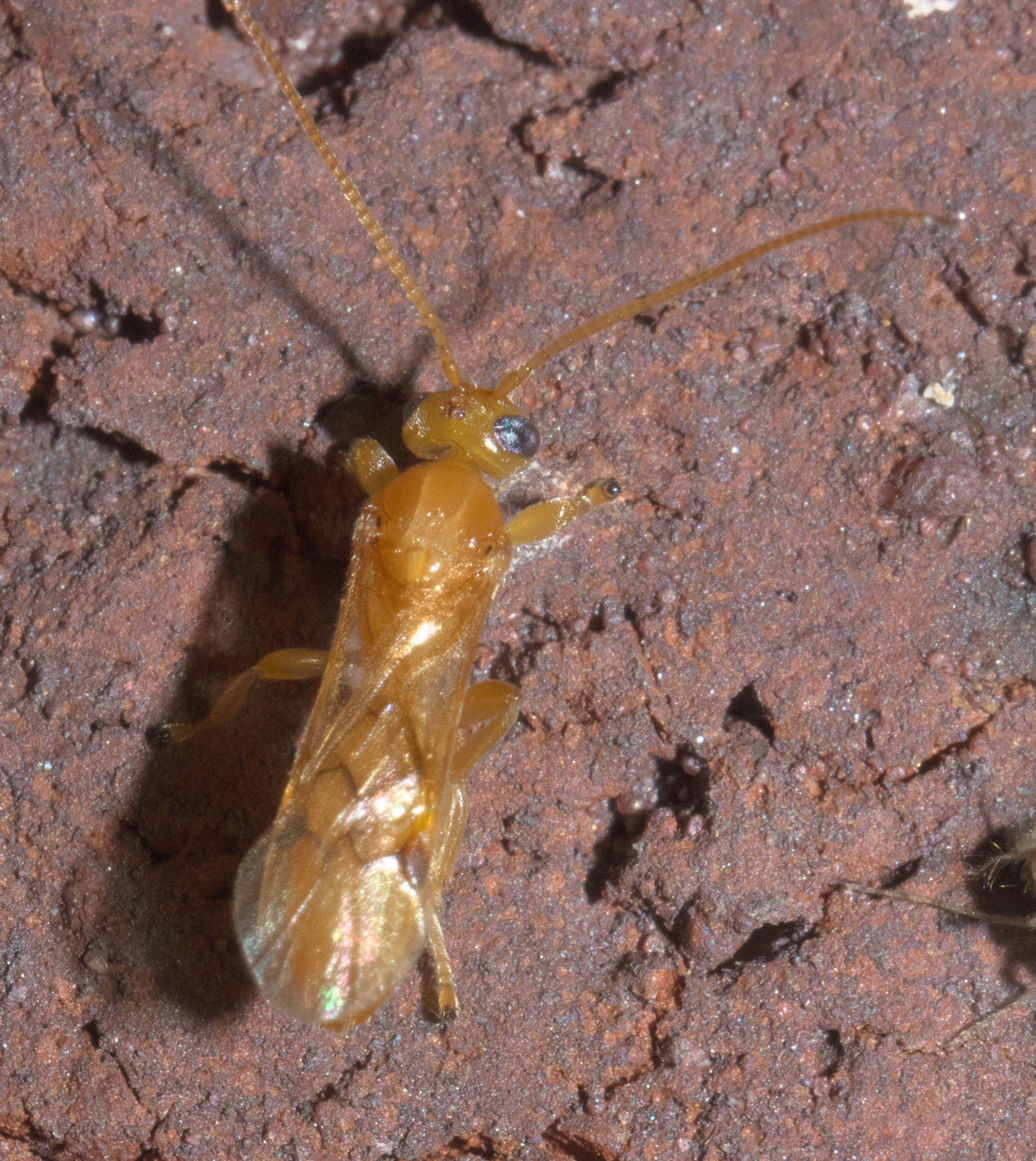

Scientific classification
- Kingdom: Animalia
- Phylum: Arthropoda
- Class: Insecta
- Order: Hymenoptera
- Family: Braconidae
- Genus: Yelicones
- Species: Y. delicatus

Binomial name
- Yelicones delicatus (Cresson, 1872)

= Yelicones delicatus =

Species of wasp

Yelicones delicatus is a species of braconid wasp in the family Braconidae.

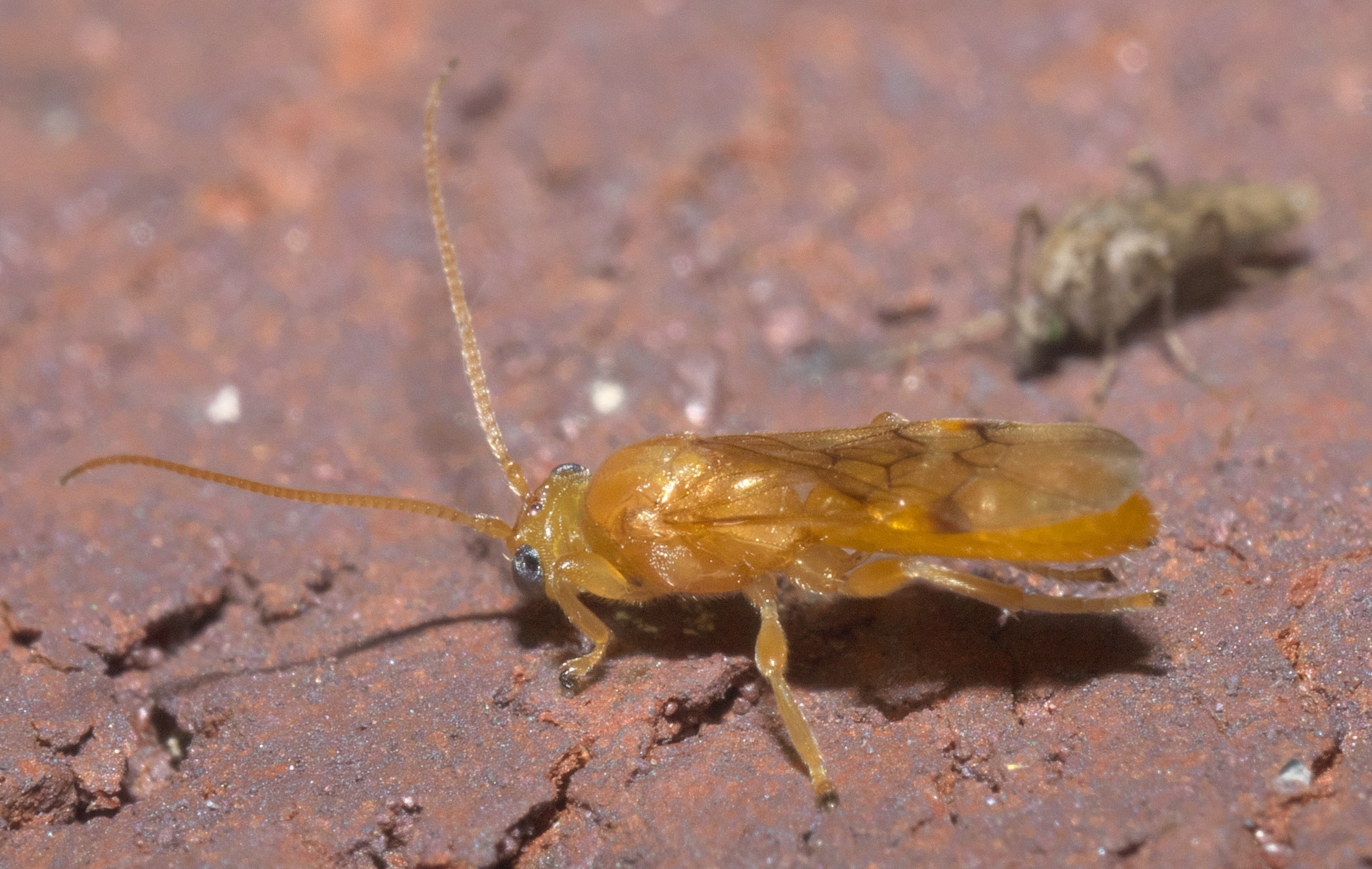
