= Racionais superstes =

Scientific classification
- Domain: Eukaryota
- Kingdom: Animalia
- Phylum: Arthropoda
- Class: Insecta
- Order: Hymenoptera
- Family: Braconidae
- Genus: Racionais
- Species: R. superstes

Binomial name
- Racionais superstes Shimbori & Zaldívar-Riverón, 2024

Species of wasp

Racionais superstes is a species of parasitoid wasp in the family Braconidae. It can be found in Ecuador.

== Description ==
It was described based on a single specimen, a female. It is overall brown in color and the holotype is 2.7 mm (0.1 in) in body length. The third tergite is striate, separating it from R. brunus whose third tergite is granulate.

== Etymology ==
The specific epithet "superstes" means "survival" or "survive". This refers to the struggle of the marginalized people of Brazil. The word was included in an album title by the Racionais MC's "Sobrevivendo no Inferno" (Surviving in Hell). The names of the genus and its species are based on the hip hop group and the societal issues they have brought attention to.
