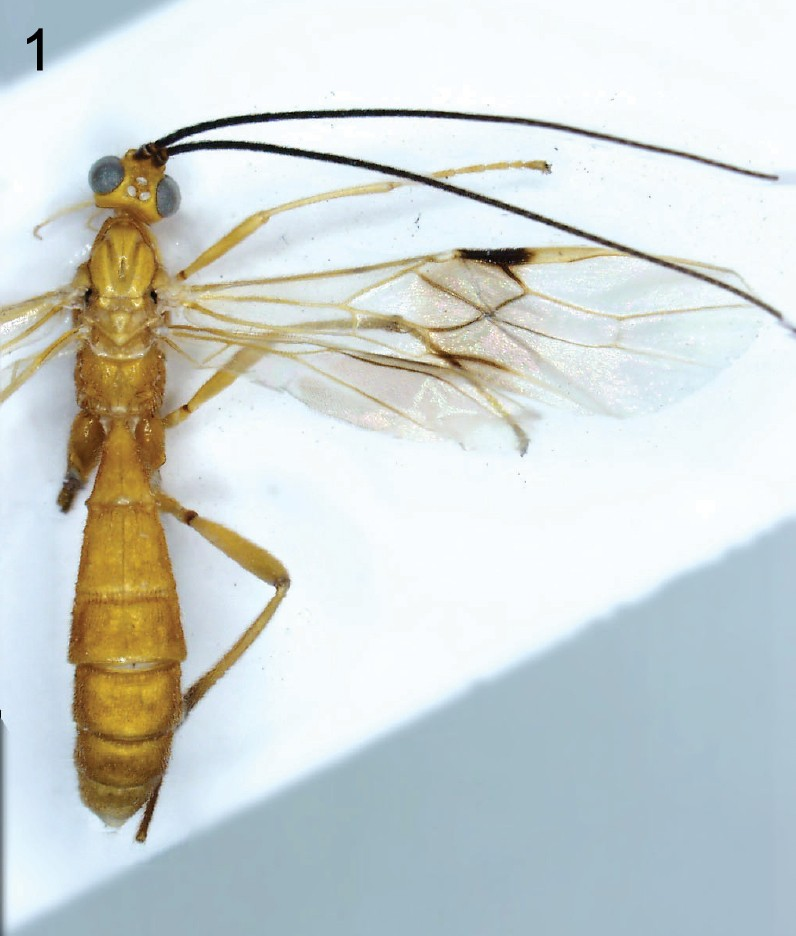

Scientific classification
- Kingdom: Animalia
- Phylum: Arthropoda
- Clade: Pancrustacea
- Class: Insecta
- Order: Hymenoptera
- Family: Braconidae
- Genus: Cystomastacoides
- Species: C. kiddo

Binomial name
- Cystomastacoides kiddo Quicke & Butcher, 2012

= Cystomastacoides kiddo =

Species of wasp

Cystomastacoides kiddo is a species of parasitoid wasp belonging to the family Braconidae. The species was found during a 2006–2008 insect collection programme in Thailand. The name is derived from the character Beatrix Kiddo from the 2003 film Kill Bill, because of their resemblance in action and colour. It is one of the four species under the genus Cystomastacoides, and the only species in Thailand. As all other braconids, the female lays its eggs inside the body of other insects, such as moth caterpillar, so that the larvae use the host body as a source of food.

== Discovery and etymology ==
Cystomastacoides kiddo was described from a female holotype which was discovered from Phetchabun Province, Thung Salaeng Luang National Park, Kaeng Wang Nam Yen, Thailand. The specimen was collected as part of the TIGER (Thailand Inventory Group for Entomological Research) programme of sampling insects in 25 national parks in Thailand between 2006 and 2008. The scientific description was published on 19 May 2013 by Donald L. J. Quicke of the Natural History Museum, London, and Buntika Areekul Butcher of the Chulalongkorn University, Thailand. The species was so-named "because of the deadly biology to the host" as the wasp reminded the scientists of the assassin Beatrix Kiddo (played by Uma Thurman), the protagonist in the film Kill Bill. Kiddo has a fatal fighting technique called "Five Point Exploding Heart Technique" by which five pressure points are rapidly struck at the heart using fingertips, and the victim dies after five paces as the heart explodes. Although the wasp does not have the exact Five Point Exploding Heart Technique, it has an "assassin"-like move while looking for prey, and additionally its body colour is like the yellow-with-black-stripes jumpsuit of Kiddo.

== Description ==
The body of Cystomastacoides kiddo is pale-brown yellow in colour. The anterior end of the head is protruding and with well-developed transverse striation. A pair of compound eyes on the head are conspicuously coloured in blue. The surface of the head (mesosoma) is shiny yellow with three distinct white pits. The tips and sides of the appendages are transversely striped in black; thus a resemblance to Kiddo's jumpsuit. The body, excluding the antennae, is 9 mm long. There are two pairs of wings, the fore and hind wings. The fore wings are larger and measure 8 mm in length. The wing membrane is almost entirely transparent (hyaline) and whitish, while the wing venation is mostly brown-yellow. The two antennae are exceptionally long compared to the rest of the body, measuring up to 12 mm. These antennae are black throughout their length. There are three pairs of legs. The abdominal part (tergum) is divided into six tergites.

== Behaviour ==
Cystomastacoides kiddo is a typical Braconid wasp which are infamous for their deadly reproductive habits. It is an obligate parasitoid and it preys on other insects for depositing the eggs. The female has a long syringe-like ovipositors, using which it injects its eggs into the host body. Inside the body of the host, the eggs develop into larvae. The larvae require food such that they eat the host from the inside out and kill the host, subsequently eating their way out to become adult wasps.
