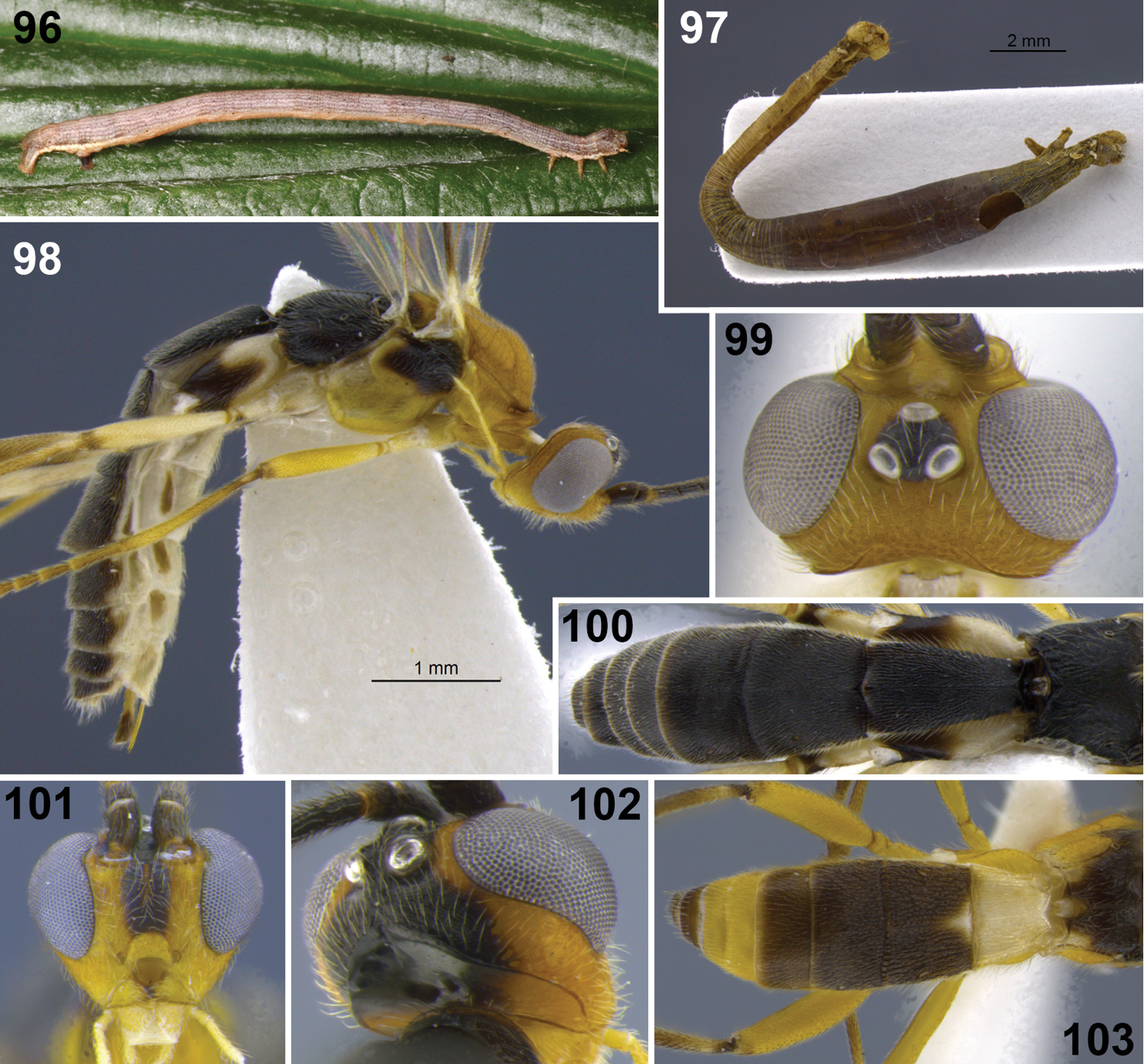
- Aleiodes shakirae

Scientific classification
- Kingdom: Animalia
- Phylum: Arthropoda
- Class: Insecta
- Order: Hymenoptera
- Family: Braconidae
- Subfamily: Rogadinae
- Tribe: Aleiodini
- Genus: Aleiodes; Wesmael, 1838

Synonyms
- Aliodes Agassiz, 1846

= Aleiodes =

Genus of wasps

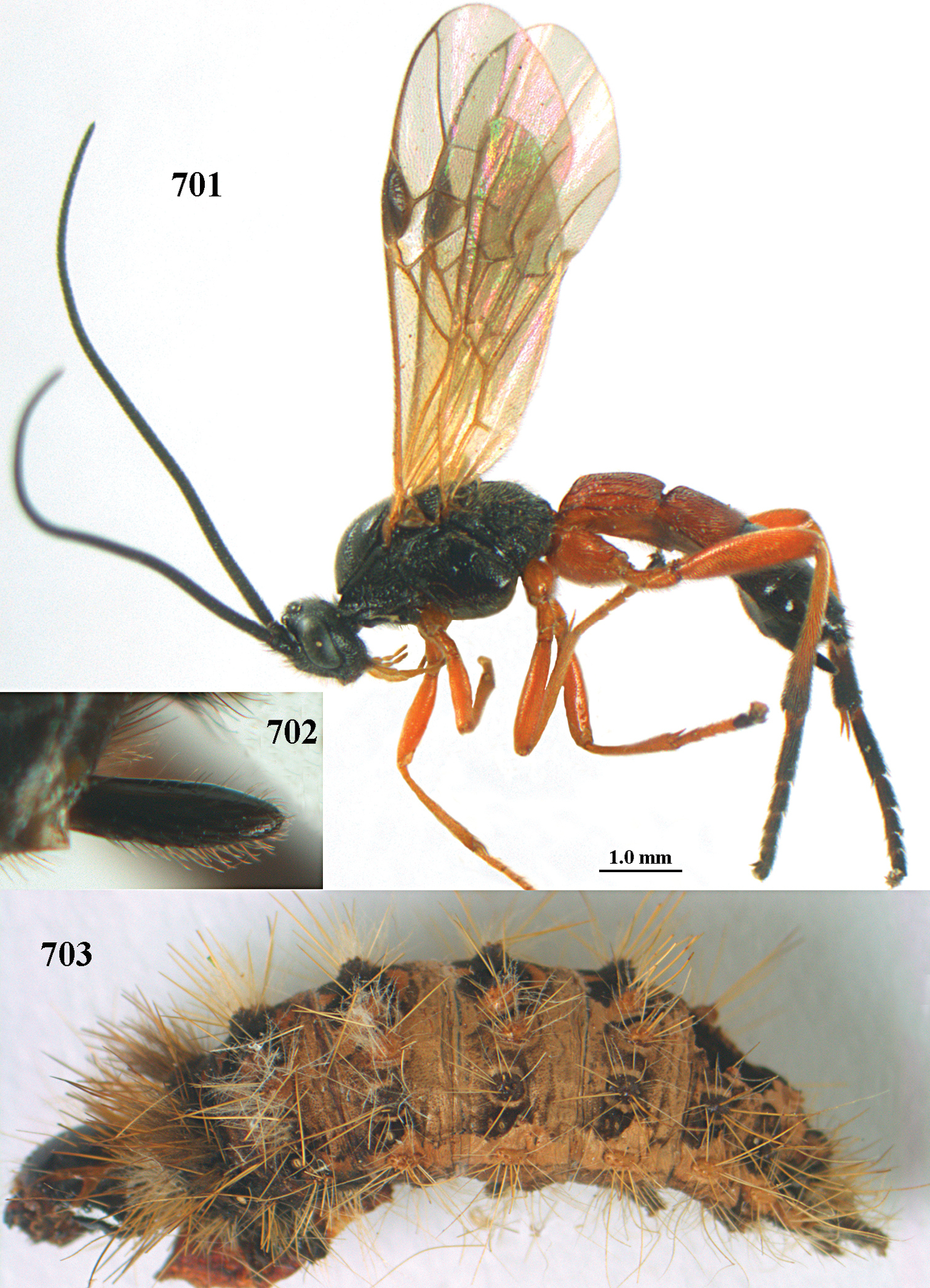
Aleiodes rugulosus

Aleiodes (Greek ἀ "not", λείος "smooth", εἵδος "appearance") is a genus of the family Braconidae of parasitoid wasps described by Constantin Wesmael in 1838. They are also known as mummy-wasps.

The female attacks caterpillars of various species, including many pests such as spongy moths and tent caterpillars, and then deposits eggs in the caterpillars. The eggs hatch and the wasp larva feeds on the caterpillar, leaving a hardened caterpillar skin, or mummy. The wasp pupates within the mummy and eventually the adult breaks out, leaving a small hole in the husk of the caterpillar.

There are thousands of species, including:

- Aleiodes adrianforsythi named after Adrian Forsyth
- Aleiodes cacuangoi named after Dolores Cacuango
- Aleiodes colberti named after Stephen Colbert
- Aleiodes coxalis
- Aleiodes dangerlingi named after Dan Gerling
- Aleiodes elleni named after Ellen DeGeneres
- Aleiodes falloni named after Jimmy Fallon
- Aleiodes frosti named after Robert Frost (American poet)
- Aleiodes gaga named after Lady Gaga
- Aleiodes heterogaster type species of genus
- Aleiodes kingmani named after Eduardo Kingman
- Aleiodes shakirae named after Shakira (Colombian singer)
- Aleiodes stewarti named after Jon Stewart (American comedian)
- Aleiodes tashimai
