= Racionais (wasp) =

Scientific classification
- Kingdom: Animalia
- Phylum: Arthropoda
- Class: Insecta
- Order: Hymenoptera
- Family: Braconidae
- Subfamily: Rogadinae
- Tribe: Gondwanocentrini
- Genus: Racionais; Shimbori & Zaldívar-Riverón, 2024

Type species
- Racionais superstes Shimbori & Zaldívar-Riverón, 2024

Species
- Racionais brunus Shimbori & Zaldívar-Riverón, 2024; Racionais kaelejay Shimbori & Zaldívar-Riverón, 2024; Racionais superstes Shimbori & Zaldívar-Riverón, 2024

Genus of wasps

Racionais is a genus of parasitoid wasp in the family Braconidae. The genus is represented in Brazil and Ecuador. There are three species in the genus as of its description in August 2024.

== Etymology ==
The genus is named after the Brazilian hip hop group Racionais MC's because of their contributions to drawing attention to marginalized black people that live on the outskirts of large cities in Brazil.
