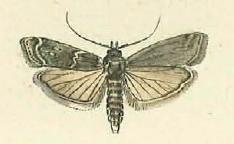

Scientific classification
- Kingdom: Animalia
- Phylum: Arthropoda
- Class: Insecta
- Order: Lepidoptera
- Family: Pyralidae
- Genus: Phycita
- Species: P. meliella

Binomial name
- Phycita meliella (Mann, 1864)

Synonyms
- Nephopteryx meliella Mann, 1864

= Phycita meliella =

Species of moth

Phycita meliella is a moth of the family Pyralidae described by Josef Johann Mann in 1864. It is found in Italy, Slovenia, the Czech Republic, Slovakia, Hungary, Croatia, Bosnia and Herzegovina, Albania, North Macedonia, Greece, Bulgaria, Romania and Turkey.

The wingspan is about 26 millimetres (1.0 in). Adults are on wing from June to August.
