= Racionais kaelejay =

Scientific classification
- Domain: Eukaryota
- Kingdom: Animalia
- Phylum: Arthropoda
- Class: Insecta
- Order: Hymenoptera
- Family: Braconidae
- Genus: Racionais
- Species: R. kaelejay

Binomial name
- Racionais kaelejay Shimbori & Zaldívar-Riverón, 2024

Species of wasp

Racionais kaelejay is a species of parasitoid wasp in the family Braconidae. It can be found in Brazil.

== Description ==
It was described based on a single specimen, a male. It is overall brownish yellow in color and the holotype is 2.2 mm (0.09 in) in body length.

== Etymology ==
The specific epithet "kaelejay" is a tribute to DJ KL Jay, a member of the hip hop group Racionais MC's.
