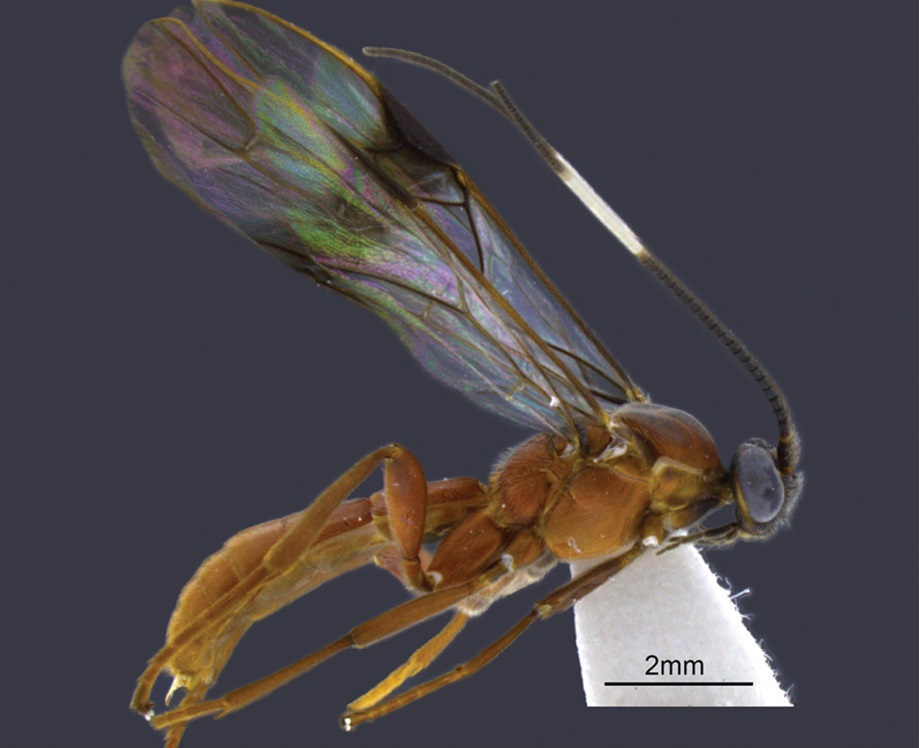

Scientific classification
- Kingdom: Animalia
- Phylum: Arthropoda
- Clade: Pancrustacea
- Class: Insecta
- Order: Hymenoptera
- Family: Braconidae
- Genus: Aleiodes
- Species: A. colberti

Binomial name
- Aleiodes colberti Shimbori & Shaw, 2014

= Aleiodes colberti =

Species of wasp

Aleiodes colberti is a species of parasitoid wasp in the family Braconidae. It was discovered in Ecuador.
