= Phycita poteriella =

Scientific classification
- Kingdom: Animalia
- Phylum: Arthropoda
- Clade: Pancrustacea
- Class: Insecta
- Order: Lepidoptera
- Family: Pyralidae
- Subfamily: Phycitinae
- Tribe: Phycitini
- Genus: Phycita
- Species: P. poteriella

Binomial name
- Phycita poteriella (Zeller, 1846)

Synonyms
- Nephopteryx poteriella Zeller, 1846; Phycita kruegeri Turati, 1911; Phycita metzneri (Zeller, 1846)

Species of moth

Phycita poteriella is a species of snout moth. It is found in North Macedonia, Greece, Bulgaria, Romania, Croatia, Italy, France, Hungary, Turkey, and Spain. It has also been recorded from Israel and Yemen.

The larvae have been recorded feeding on Ricinus communis.
