= Phycita torrenti =

Scientific classification
- Domain: Eukaryota
- Kingdom: Animalia
- Phylum: Arthropoda
- Class: Insecta
- Order: Lepidoptera
- Family: Pyralidae
- Genus: Phycita
- Species: P. torrenti

Binomial name
- Phycita torrenti Agenjo, 1962

Species of moth

Phycita torrenti is a species of snout moth. It is found in Spain and Portugal.

The larvae feed on Quercus ilex.
