= Jannya =

Scientific classification
- Domain: Eukaryota
- Kingdom: Animalia
- Phylum: Arthropoda
- Class: Insecta
- Order: Hymenoptera
- Family: Braconidae
- Subfamily: Rogadinae
- Tribe: Facitorini
- Genus: Jannya van Achterberg, 1995

Type species
- Jannya brevitarsus van Achterberg, 1995

Species
- Jannya brevitarsus van Achterberg, 1995; Jannya nigriceps van Achterberg, 1995; Jannya pasargadae Gadelha & Shimbori, 2024

Parasitoid wasp

Jannya is a genus of parasitoid wasp in the family Braconidae and can be found in the Neotropical region. It contains three known species.

== Etymology ==
The name is derived from the name of the author's wife, Janny. He gave her this tribute, because she understood his need to spend extensive time studying Braconidae and provided meals for him.
