= Racionais brunus =

Scientific classification
- Domain: Eukaryota
- Kingdom: Animalia
- Phylum: Arthropoda
- Class: Insecta
- Order: Hymenoptera
- Family: Braconidae
- Genus: Racionais
- Species: R. brunus

Binomial name
- Racionais brunus Shimbori & Zaldívar-Riverón, 2024

Species of wasp

Racionais brunus is a species of parasitoid wasp in the family Braconidae. It can be found in Brazil.

== Description ==
It was described based on a single specimen, a female. It is overall brown in color and the holotype is 2.7 mm (0.1 in) in body length. The third tergite is granulate, separating it from R. superstes whose third tergite is striate.

== Etymology ==
The specific epithet "brunus" is a tribute to Mano Brown, a member of the hip hop group Racionais MC's. Brunus means brown in Late Latin.
