= Jannya brevitarsus =

Scientific classification
- Domain: Eukaryota
- Kingdom: Animalia
- Phylum: Arthropoda
- Class: Insecta
- Order: Hymenoptera
- Family: Braconidae
- Genus: Jannya
- Species: J. brevitarsus

Binomial name
- Jannya brevitarsus van Achterberg, 1995

Specie of parasitoid wasp

Jannya brevitarsus is a species of parasitoid wasp in the family Braconidae. It is known to occur in Colombia, Costa Rica, and Ecuador. It is the type species of its genus.
