= Phycita pedisignella =

Scientific classification
- Domain: Eukaryota
- Kingdom: Animalia
- Phylum: Arthropoda
- Class: Insecta
- Order: Lepidoptera
- Family: Pyralidae
- Genus: Phycita
- Species: P. pedisignella

Binomial name
- Phycita pedisignella Ragonot, 1887

Species of moth

Phycita pedisignella is a species of snout moth described by Émile Louis Ragonot in 1887. It is found in Greece, North Macedonia and Turkey.

The wingspan is about 25 mm.
