= Phycita strigata =

Scientific classification
- Kingdom: Animalia
- Phylum: Arthropoda
- Class: Insecta
- Order: Lepidoptera
- Family: Pyralidae
- Genus: Phycita
- Species: P. strigata

Binomial name
- Phycita strigata (Staudinger, 1879)

Synonyms
- Nephopterix strigata Staudinger, 1879

Species of moth

Phycita strigata is a species of snout moth. It is found in Spain.

The wingspan is 21–24 mm.
