= Phycita nephodeella =

Scientific classification
- Kingdom: Animalia
- Phylum: Arthropoda
- Class: Insecta
- Order: Lepidoptera
- Family: Pyralidae
- Genus: Phycita
- Species: P. nephodeella

Binomial name
- Phycita nephodeella Ragonot, 1887

Species of moth

Phycita nephodeella is a species of snout moth described by Émile Louis Ragonot in 1887. It is found in Italy and Transcaucasia.

The wingspan is about 26 mm.
