= List of Rogas species =

This is a list of 107 species in Rogas, a genus of wasp in the family Braconidae.

== Rogas species ==
- Rogas abraxas Bano, 2001^{c g}
- Rogas aequalis (Szepligeti, 1914)^{c g}
- Rogas annulifemur (Enderlein, 1920)^{c g}
- Rogas areatus (Enderlein, 1920)^{c g}
- Rogas areolatus (Szepligeti, 1914)^{c g}
- Rogas ashmeadi Watanabe, 1957^{c g}
- Rogas asmaranus (Enderlein, 1920)^{c g}
- Rogas atripes (Szepligeti, 1914)^{c g}
- Rogas baguioensis Shenefelt, 1975^{c g}
- Rogas banksi (Baker, 1917)^{c g}
- Rogas benguetensis (Baker, 1917)^{c g}
- Rogas bevisi (Brues, 1926)^{c}
- Rogas bicolor (Schrottky, 1915)^{c g}
- Rogas bicoloratus (Enderlein, 1920)^{c g}
- Rogas breviventris (Enderlein, 1912)^{c g}
- Rogas brownii (Baker, 1917)^{c g}
- Rogas capensis (Cameron, 1905)^{c g}
- Rogas cerurae (Ashmead, 1889)^{c g}
- Rogas ceylonicus (Enderlein, 1912)^{c}
- Rogas citernii (Mantero, 1904)^{c g}
- Rogas coloratus Motschoulsky, 1863^{c g}
- Rogas crassipalpus (Enderlein, 1912)^{c g}
- Rogas desertus (Telenga, 1941)^{c}
- Rogas ecuadoriensis (Brues, 1926)^{c g}
- Rogas elongatus (Szepligeti, 1914)^{c g}
- Rogas erythroderus (Spinola, 1851)^{c g}
- Rogas eupoeyiae (Ashmead, 1897)^{c g}
- Rogas fascipennis (Cresson, 1869)^{c g}
- Rogas festivus (Statz, 1938)^{c g}
- Rogas flavomarginatus (Szepligeti, 1914)^{c g}
- Rogas flavus (Baker, 1917)^{c g}
- Rogas fritschii (Brues, 1933)^{c g}
- Rogas fulvinervis (Cameron, 1911)^{c g}
- Rogas fusciceps (Cresson, 1869)^{c g}
- Rogas fuscovarius (Cresson, 1865)^{c g}
- Rogas grandimaculatus (Cameron, 1910)^{c g}
- Rogas hova (Granger, 1949)^{c}
- Rogas iliganensis Shenefelt, 1975^{c g}
- Rogas inaequalis (Szepligeti, 1914)^{c g}
- Rogas indianensis Muesebeck & Walkley, 1951^{c g}
- Rogas indicus (Cameron, 1910)^{c}
- Rogas insignicornis (Granger, 1949)^{c g}
- Rogas insignis (Brues, 1926)^{c g}
- Rogas kanpurensis (Pant, 1960)^{c g}
- Rogas lateralis (Cameron, 1905)^{c g}
- Rogas longicollis (Baker, 1917)^{c g}
- Rogas luteus Nees, 1834^{c g}
- Rogas luzonensis (Baker, 1917)^{c g}
- Rogas maculicornis (Brues, 1926)^{c g}
- Rogas melanocephalus (Cameron, 1887)^{c}
- Rogas melanocerus (Cameron, 1906)^{c g}
- Rogas melanosoma (Ashmead, 1905)^{c g}
- Rogas melanospilus (Cameron, 1911)^{c}
- Rogas melleus (Cresson, 1896)^{c g}
- Rogas meridianus (Szepligeti, 1914)^{c g}
- Rogas mimeuri (Ferriere, 1925)^{c g}
- Rogas mimicus (Baker, 1917)^{c g}
- Rogas modestus (Baker, 1917)^{c g}
- Rogas nigricans Chen & He, 1997^{c g}
- Rogas nigricarpus (Szepligeti, 1907)^{c}
- Rogas nigriceps (Brèthes, 1909)^{c g}
- Rogas nigridorsum Belokobylskij, 1996^{c g}
- Rogas nigristigma Chen & He, 1997^{c g}
- Rogas nigronotatus (Szepligeti, 1914)^{c g}
- Rogas nigroornatus (Szepligeti, 1914)^{c g}
- Rogas nigrovenosus (Vojnovskaja-Krieger, 1935)^{c g}
- Rogas orientalis (Szepligeti, 1914)^{c g}
- Rogas ornatus (Cresson, 1869)^{c g}
- Rogas oyeyamensis (Watanabe, 1937)^{c g}
- Rogas palavanicus (Baker, 1917)^{c g}
- Rogas pallidipalpis (Cameron, 1911)^{c g}
- Rogas pictipennis (Brues, 1924)^{c}
- Rogas pilosus (Cameron, 1910)^{c g}
- Rogas plecopterae (Chatterjee, 1943)^{c g}
- Rogas praeustus (Fahringer, 1941)^{c g}
- Rogas punctipleuris (Szepligeti, 1914)^{c g}
- Rogas pygmaeus (Enderlein, 1920)^{c}
- Rogas roonensis (Cameron, 1910)^{c g}
- Rogas roxanus (Telenga, 1941)^{c g}
- Rogas rufifemur (Szepligeti, 1914)^{c g}
- Rogas ruspolii (Mantero, 1904)^{c g}
- Rogas sanchezi (Baker, 1917)^{c g}
- Rogas saturatus (Brues, 1926)^{c g}
- Rogas scioensis (Mantero, 1904)^{c g}
- Rogas semiluteus (Szepligeti, 1911)^{c}
- Rogas semirufus (Szepligeti, 1911)^{c g}
- Rogas separatus (Baker, 1917)^{c g}
- Rogas siccitesta (Morley, 1937)^{c g}
- Rogas signaticornis (Enderlein, 1920)^{c g}
- Rogas signativena (Enderlein, 1920)^{c g}
- Rogas somaliensis (Szepligeti, 1914)^{c}
- Rogas speciosicornis (Granger, 1949)^{c}
- Rogas steinbachi Mathur, 1957^{c g}
- Rogas striatifrons (Cameron, 1911)^{c g}
- Rogas subquadratus (Baker, 1917)^{c g}
- Rogas surrogatus (Schulz, 1907)^{c g}
- Rogas tertiarius (Brues, 1906)^{c g}
- Rogas testaceicollis (Cameron, 1910)^{c g}
- Rogas transvaalensis (Cameron, 1911)^{c}
- Rogas tricolor (Enderlein, 1912)^{c g}
- Rogas unicarinatus (Holmgren, 1868)^{c g}
- Rogas varicarinatus (Cameron, 1911)^{c g}
- Rogas varinervis (Cameron, 1911)^{c g}
- Rogas ventrimacula (Enderlein, 1920)^{c g}
- Rogas vestitor (Say, 1936)^{c g}
- Rogas vollenhoveni Gribodo, 1881^{c g}
- Rogas yanagiharai (Sonan, 1940)^{c}

This is a list of 107 species in Rogas, a genus of wasp in the family Braconidae. Data sources: i = ITIS, c = Catalogue of Life, g = GBIF, b = Bugguide.net
