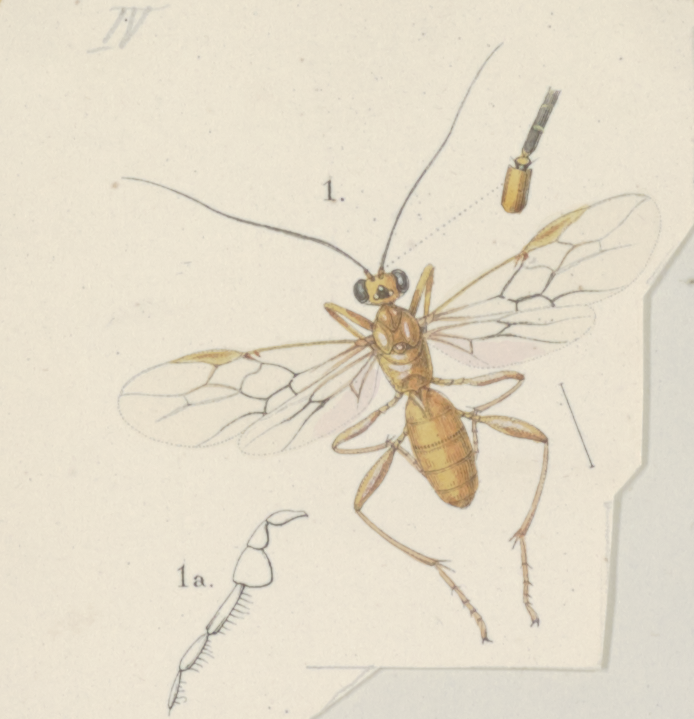
- Rogas luteus

Scientific classification
- Kingdom: Animalia
- Phylum: Arthropoda
- Class: Insecta
- Order: Hymenoptera
- Family: Braconidae
- Subfamily: Rogadinae
- Tribe: Rogadini
- Genus: Rogas; Nees von Esenbeck, 1818

= Rogas =

Genus of wasps

Rogas is a genus of wasp in the family Braconidae. There are at least 100 described species in Rogas.

== See also ==
- List of Rogas species
