= Jannya pasargadae =

Scientific classification
- Kingdom: Animalia
- Phylum: Arthropoda
- Class: Insecta
- Order: Hymenoptera
- Family: Braconidae
- Genus: Jannya
- Species: J. pasargadae

Binomial name
- Jannya pasargadae Gadelha & Shimbori, 2024

Species of wasp

Jannya pasargadae is a species of parasitoid wasp in the family Braconidae. It can be found in Amazonas, northern Brazil.

== Description ==
The species was the first to be described in the genus in around thirty years and was also the first described from Brazil. It was described based on two specimens, a male and a female. The female is the holotype. The female measured 1.6 mm (in) and the male measured 1.7 mm, which is about 1/16”. Overall, they are dark brown in coloration. The male is slightly darker than the female. It is morphologically similar to J. nigriceps.

== Etymology ==
The specific epithet "pasargadae" is derived from the type locality, Aprisco Pasárgada.
