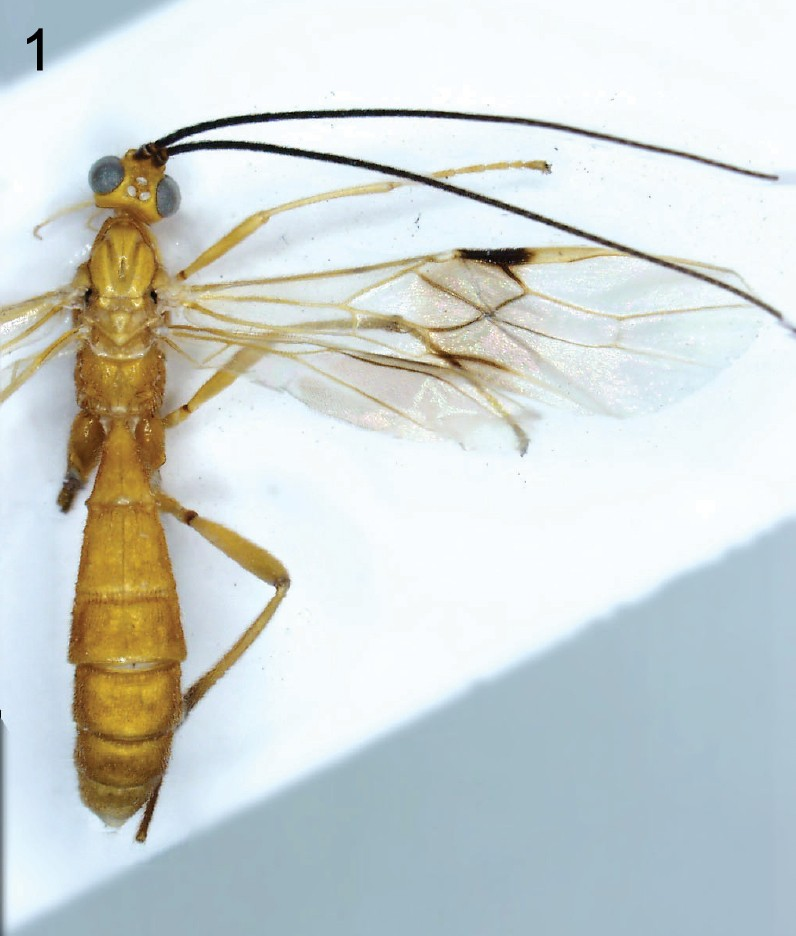
- Cystomastacoides holotype

Scientific classification
- Kingdom: Animalia
- Phylum: Arthropoda
- Clade: Pancrustacea
- Class: Insecta
- Order: Hymenoptera
- Family: Braconidae
- Subfamily: Rogadinae
- Tribe: Rogadini
- Genus: Cystomastacoides van Achterberg, 1997

Species
- Cystomastacoides asotaphaga; Cystomastacoides coxalis; Cystomastacoides kiddo; Cystomastacoides nicolepeelerae

= Cystomastacoides =

Genus of wasps

Cystomastacoides is a genus of parasitoid wasps belonging to the family Braconidae. It was named by Dutch entomologist Kees van Achterberg in 1997 from a single species Cystomastacoides coxalis discovered in Yunnan, China. There are only four species described in the genus, the other three having been reported on 19 March 2013. As typical ichneumon wasps, they are characterised by a deadly parasitoid behaviour. Their larvae grow inside the body of other insects, such as caterpillars, and feed on their internal organs inside the body until they emerge.

== Species ==
There are currently four species recognised under Cystomastacoides:

1. Cystomastacoides coxalis van Achterberg, 1997, was the first species discovered under the genus Cystomastacoides. It was discovered from Yunnan, China, and formally described in 1997.
2. Cystomastacoides kiddo Quicke & Butcher, 2012, was found during an insect collection programme in Thailand. It was discovered from Phetchabun Province, Thung Salaeng Luang National Park, Kaeng Wang Nam Yen, Thailand. The specimen was collected as part of the TIGER (Thailand Inventory Group for Entomological Research) programme of sampling insects in 25 national parks in Thailand between 2006 and 2008. It was named after Quentin Tarantino's fictional character Beatrix Kiddo from the 2003/2004 Hollywood blockbuster Kill Bill, "because of the deadly biology to the host".
3. Cystomastacoides nicolepeelerae Quicke & Butcher, 2012, was discovered in East Sepik Province, Yapsiei, Papua New Guinea. It was named in honour of Nicole Peeler, the favourite author of Donald Quicke, one of the discoverers.
4. Cystomastacoides asotaphaga Quicke & Butcher, 2012, was discovered in Kokoda, Papua New Guinea. The name means "feeding on Asota" as it was found in the moth Asota plana.

== Description ==
Cystomastacoides are small wasps and typically yellow in colour. The body length ranges from 9–13 mm. They have two pairs of wings. The pair of forewings are much larger and measure 8–14 mm in length. The wing membrane is almost entirely transparent (hyaline) and pale. Wing venation is mostly brown-yellow. The antennae are exceptionally long compared to the rest of the body, measuring up to 14 mm. A pair of compound eyes on the head are conspicuously coloured blue or dark-blue. The abdominal part (tergum) is divided into six tergites. They belong to the Colastomion Baker, 1917, group of genera which additionally includes the tropical Old World genera Macrostomion Szépligeti, 1900, Megarhogas Szépligeti, 1904, and Myocron van Achterberg, 1991 (van Achterberg 1991). This group is distinctive in having the combination of abdominal segment (tergite) strongly narrowed subbasally and having the hind tibial spurs strongly curved and largely glabrous. They have a well-developed tooth on the hind coxa and claws with pointed basal lobes.

== Behaviour ==
Cystomastacoides are typical ichneumon wasps which are infamous for their fatal reproductive habits. They are obligate parasitoids and deposit their eggs in other insects. The females have long syringe-like ovipositors, which they use to inject their eggs into the host body. Once inside the body of the host, the eggs develop into larvae. The larvae then start to consume the internal organs of the host and ultimately kill the host.
