= Aleiodini =

Scientific classification
- Domain: Eukaryota
- Kingdom: Animalia
- Phylum: Arthropoda
- Class: Insecta
- Order: Hymenoptera
- Family: Braconidae
- Subfamily: Rogadinae
- Tribe: Aleiodini; Muesebeck, 1928

Tribe of wasps

Aleiodini is a tribe of parasitoid wasp in the family Braconidae. It is represented in the whole world. It is the sister tribe to Yeliconini and Facitorini.

== Genera ==
The following genera are included:

- Aleiodes Wesmael, 1838 – World
- Heterogamus Wesmael, 1838 – World
- Pararhyssalus Cameron, 1911 – Neotropical
