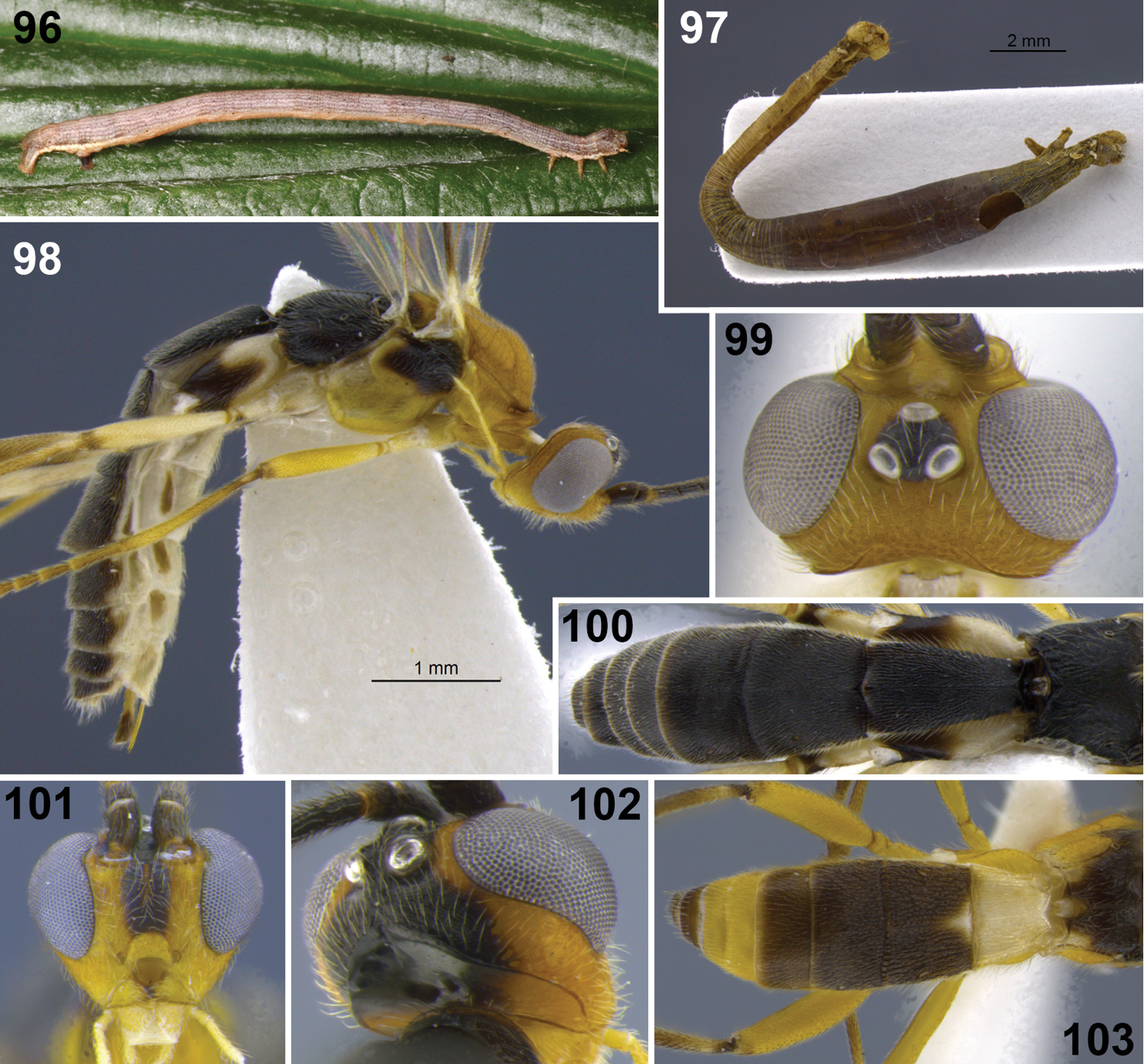

Scientific classification
- Kingdom: Animalia
- Phylum: Arthropoda
- Clade: Pancrustacea
- Class: Insecta
- Order: Hymenoptera
- Family: Braconidae
- Genus: Aleiodes
- Species: A. shakirae

Binomial name
- Aleiodes shakirae Shimbori & Shaw, 2014

= Aleiodes shakirae =

Species of wasp

Aleiodes shakirae is a species of parasitic wasp belonging to the family Braconidae. The species is named after Shakira because "parasitism by this species causes the host caterpillar to bend and twist its abdomen in various ways, and Shakira is also famous for her belly-dancing."

== See also ==
- List of organisms named after famous people (born 1975–present)
