= Soraya (wasp) =

Scientific classification
- Kingdom: Animalia
- Phylum: Arthropoda
- Class: Insecta
- Order: Hymenoptera
- Family: Braconidae
- Subfamily: Rogadinae
- Tribe: Gondwanocentrini
- Genus: Soraya; Shimbori, 2024

Type species
- Soraya alencarae Shimbori, 2024

Species
- Soraya alencarae Shimbori, 2024; Soraya venus Shimbori & Zaldívar-Riverón, 2024

Genus of wasp

Soraya is a bitypic genus of parasitoid wasp in the family Braconidae. It is represented in Brazil. As of the description of the genus in 2024, it holds two species.

== Etymology ==
The genus is named after Soraya Alencar for their contributions to the taxonomy of parasitoid wasps.
