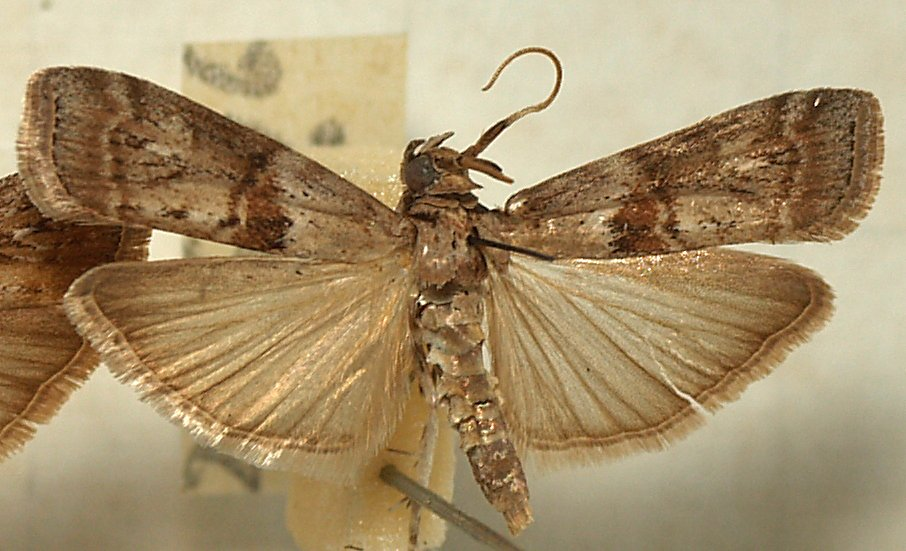

Scientific classification
- Kingdom: Animalia
- Phylum: Arthropoda
- Clade: Pancrustacea
- Class: Insecta
- Order: Lepidoptera
- Family: Pyralidae
- Genus: Phycita
- Species: P. roborella

Binomial name
- Phycita roborella (Denis & Schiffermüller, 1775)

Synonyms
- Phalaena (Tinea) roborella Denis & Schiffermüller, 1775; Phycita spissicella (Fabricius, [1777]) (nom. obl.); Tinea spissicella Fabricius, [1777] (nom. obl.); Phycita legatella Stephens, 1834

= Phycita roborella =

Species of moth

Phycita roborella is a moth of the family Pyralidae. It is – under its junior synonym Tinea spissicella – the type species of its genus Phycita, and by extension of the subfamily Phycitinae.

It is found in Europe. The wingspan is 24–29 mm.The forewings are fuscous, mixed or tinged with reddish and sprinkled with grey whitish, more whitish-suffused towards dorsum between lines; an erect triangular reddish-brown blackish-mixed patch from dorsum before first line, often preceded by a whitish shade; first and second lines pale, internally darker-edged; a curved darker transverse discal mark; some short black dashes on veins near before second line. Hindwings fuscous.The larva is brown-reddish, yellowish-freckled; subdorsal and lateral lines darker; head reddish-brown; 2 black-spotted; a white black ringed lateral spot on 3: amongst spun leaves of oak.

The moth flies in one generation from the end of June to September.

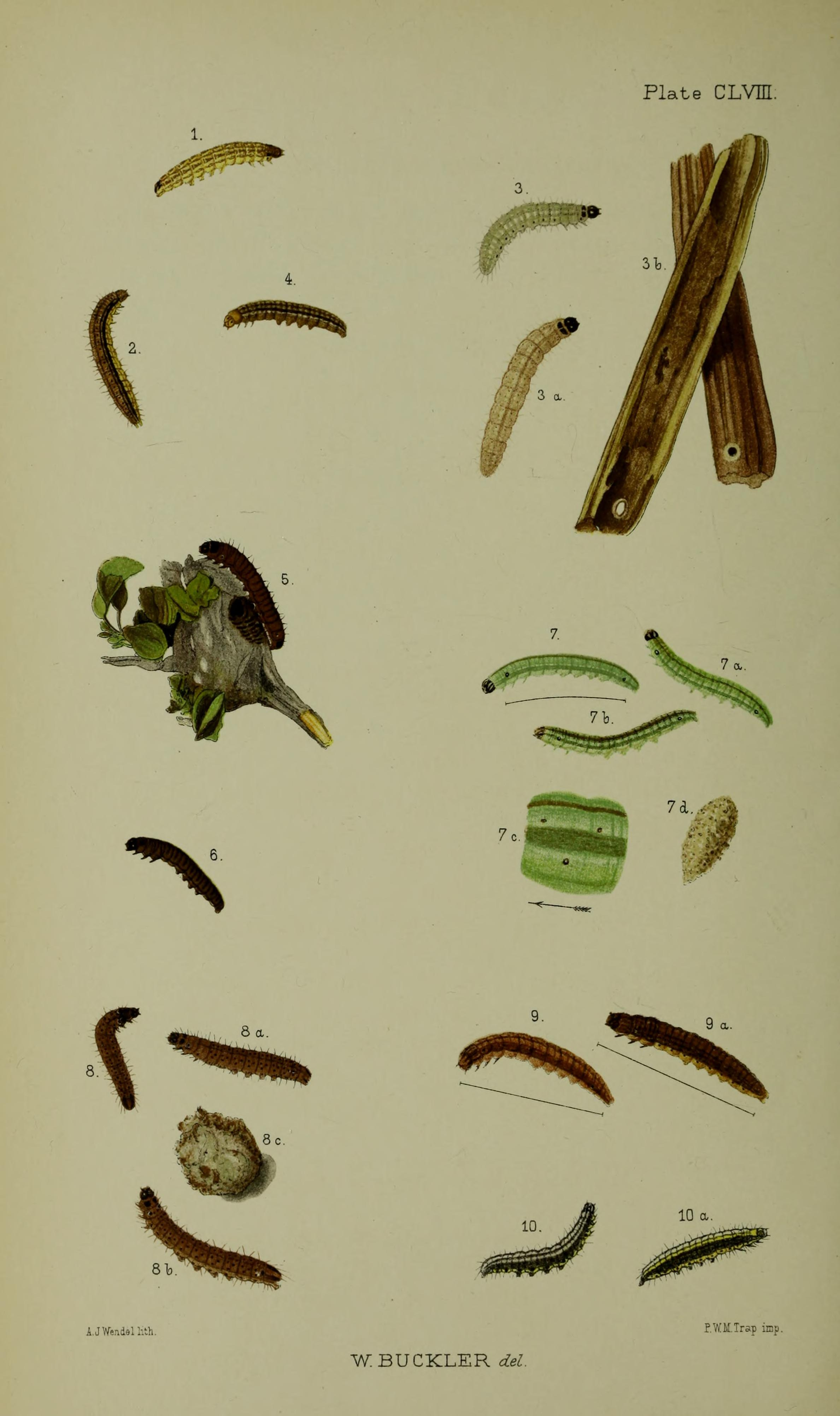
Figs. 9, 9a larva after final moult slightly magnified

The caterpillars feed on oak, apple and pear.

== Notes ==
1. The flight season refers to Belgium and The Netherlands. This may vary in other parts of the range.
