= Phycita melongenae =

Scientific classification
- Kingdom: Animalia
- Phylum: Arthropoda
- Clade: Pancrustacea
- Class: Insecta
- Order: Lepidoptera
- Family: Pyralidae
- Genus: Phycita
- Species: P. melongenae

Binomial name
- Phycita melongenae Aina, 1983

Species of moth

Phycita melongenae is a species of moth in the family Pyralidae. It was described by J. O. Aina in 1983. This species can be found in West Africa.

== Ecology ==
Phycita melongenae is a pest on eggplant. The scientific name for eggplant (Solanum melongena) is the source of the specific name for this moth species.
