= Jannya nigriceps =

Scientific classification
- Domain: Eukaryota
- Kingdom: Animalia
- Phylum: Arthropoda
- Class: Insecta
- Order: Hymenoptera
- Family: Braconidae
- Genus: Jannya
- Species: J. nigriceps

Binomial name
- Jannya nigriceps van Achterberg, 1995

Species of wasp

Jannya nigriceps is a species of parasitoid wasp in the family Braconidae.

== Description ==
An overall dark brown species that is especially similar to J. pasargadae.

== Distribution ==
The species was described based on a single specimen, so little is known about this species and its distribution. However, it is known to occur in Costa Rica, as this is where the holotype was found.
