= Soraya alencarae =

Scientific classification
- Domain: Eukaryota
- Kingdom: Animalia
- Phylum: Arthropoda
- Class: Insecta
- Order: Hymenoptera
- Family: Braconidae
- Genus: Soraya
- Species: S. alencarae

Binomial name
- Soraya alencarae Shimbori, 2024

Species of wasp

Soraya alencarae is a species of parasitoid wasp in the family Braconidae. It can be found in Brazil. It is the type species of its genus.

== Description ==
It was described based on three specimens, all female. The species is overall brown with a light band on the metasoma, a light head and mostly light legs. The body length is 3–3.1 mm (±0.12 in). It can be distinguished from S. venus by its complete occipital carina, which means that the ridge running at the margins on the back of the head connects in the middle at the top. In S. venus, these ridges do not connect. Another way to distinguish them is by their color. S. venus has multiple light bands over the body distributed on both on the mesosoma and the metasoma.

== Etymology ==
Both the genus name and the specific epithet is a tribute to Soraya Alencar for their contributions and love for entomology.
