= Phycita clientella =

Scientific classification
- Kingdom: Animalia
- Phylum: Arthropoda
- Clade: Pancrustacea
- Class: Insecta
- Order: Lepidoptera
- Family: Pyralidae
- Genus: Phycita
- Species: P. clientella

Binomial name
- Phycita clientella Zeller, 1867

Species of moth

Phycita clientella, the brinjal leaf-folding caterpillar, is a moth of the family Pyralidae. The species was first described by Philipp Christoph Zeller in 1867. It is found in India, western Malaysia, Sri Lanka, Nicobar Islands and the Andaman Islands.

Host plants of the caterpillar include, Solanum melongena, Solanum torvum, Ricinus communis and Solanum lycopersicum.
