= Rogadini =

Scientific classification
- Domain: Eukaryota
- Kingdom: Animalia
- Phylum: Arthropoda
- Class: Insecta
- Order: Hymenoptera
- Family: Braconidae
- Subfamily: Rogadinae
- Tribe: Rogadini; Foerster, 1862

Tribe of parasitoid wasp

Rogadini is a tribe of parasitoid wasp in the family Braconidae. It is represented in the entire world. It is the largest tribe within the subfamily Rogadinae with 40 extant genera. It is also considered to be the most basal tribe in the subfamily.

== Genera ==
The following 41 (extant or extinct) genera are included:

- Afrorogas Quicke, 2021 – Afrotropical
- Amanirogas Quicke, 2021 – Afrotropical
- Aspidorogas van Achterberg, 1991 – Afrotropical
- Batotheca Enderlein, 1905 – Australasian
- Batothecoides Watanabe, 1958 – Oriental
- Bequartia Fahringer, 1936 – Afrotropical
- Bioalfa Sharkey, 2021 – Neotropical
- Canalirogas Chen & van Achterberg, 1996 – Oriental, Australasian
- Colastomion Baker, 1917 – Tropical Palearctic
- Conspinaria Schulz, 1906 – Oriental, Australasian
- Cornutorogas Chen et al. 2004 – Oriental
- Cratodactyla Szépligeti, 1914 – Afrotropical
- Cystomastacoides van Achterberg, 1997 – Oriental, Australasian
- Cystomastax Szépligeti, 1904 – Neotropical
- Darnilia van Achterberg, 1989 – Oriental, Australasian
- † Digastrotheca Brues, 1933
- Gyroneuron Kokujev, 1901 – Oriental
- Gyroneuronella Baker, 1917 – Oriental
- Hermosomastax Quicke, 2021 – Neotropical
- Iporhogas Granger, 1949 – Paleotropical
- Korupia van Achterberg, 1991 – Afrotropical
- Macrostomion Szépligeti, 1900 – Pantropical
- Megarhogas Szépligeti, 1904 – Oriental
- Myocron van Achterberg, 1991 – Afrotropical
- Orthorhogas Granger, 1949 – Afrotropical
- Papuarogas Quicke, 2021 – Australasian
- Pegarthrum Cameron, 1910 – Oriental, Australasian
- Pseudogyroneuron Baker, 1917 – Oriental
- Quasimodorogas Quicke & Butcher, 2011 – Oriental
- Rectivena van Achterberg, 1991 – Afrotropical
- Rhinoprotoma van Achterberg, 1995 – Australasian
- Rhogasella Baker, 1917 – Oriental
- Rogas Nees, 1819 – Palearctic
- Rogasodes Chen & He, 1997 – Oriental
- Spinaria Brullé, 1846 – Oriental, Australasian
- Spinariella Szépligeti, 1906 – Oriental, Australasian
- Teresirogas Quicke & Shaw, 2014 – Australasian
- Trigonophatnus Cameron, 1907 – Australasian
- Triraphis Ruthe, 1855 – World
- Troporhogas Cameron, 1905 – Oriental
- Vojtechirogas Quicke & van Achterberg, 2012 – Australasian
