= Ghibli (wasp) =

Scientific classification
- Kingdom: Animalia
- Phylum: Arthropoda
- Clade: Pancrustacea
- Class: Insecta
- Order: Hymenoptera
- Family: Braconidae
- Subfamily: Rogadinae
- Tribe: Gondwanocentrini
- Genus: Ghibli; Shimbori & Zaldívar-Riverón, 2024

Type species
- Ghibli totoro Shimbori & Zaldívar-Riverón, 2024

Species
- Ghibli miyazakii Shimbori & Zaldívar-Riverón, 2024; Ghibli totoro Shimbori & Zaldívar-Riverón, 2024

Genus of wasp

Ghibli is a bitypic genus of parasitoid wasp in the family Braconidae. It is represented in Bolivia and Ecuador in cloud forest habitats.

== Etymology ==
The genus is named after the Japanese animation studio Ghibli.
