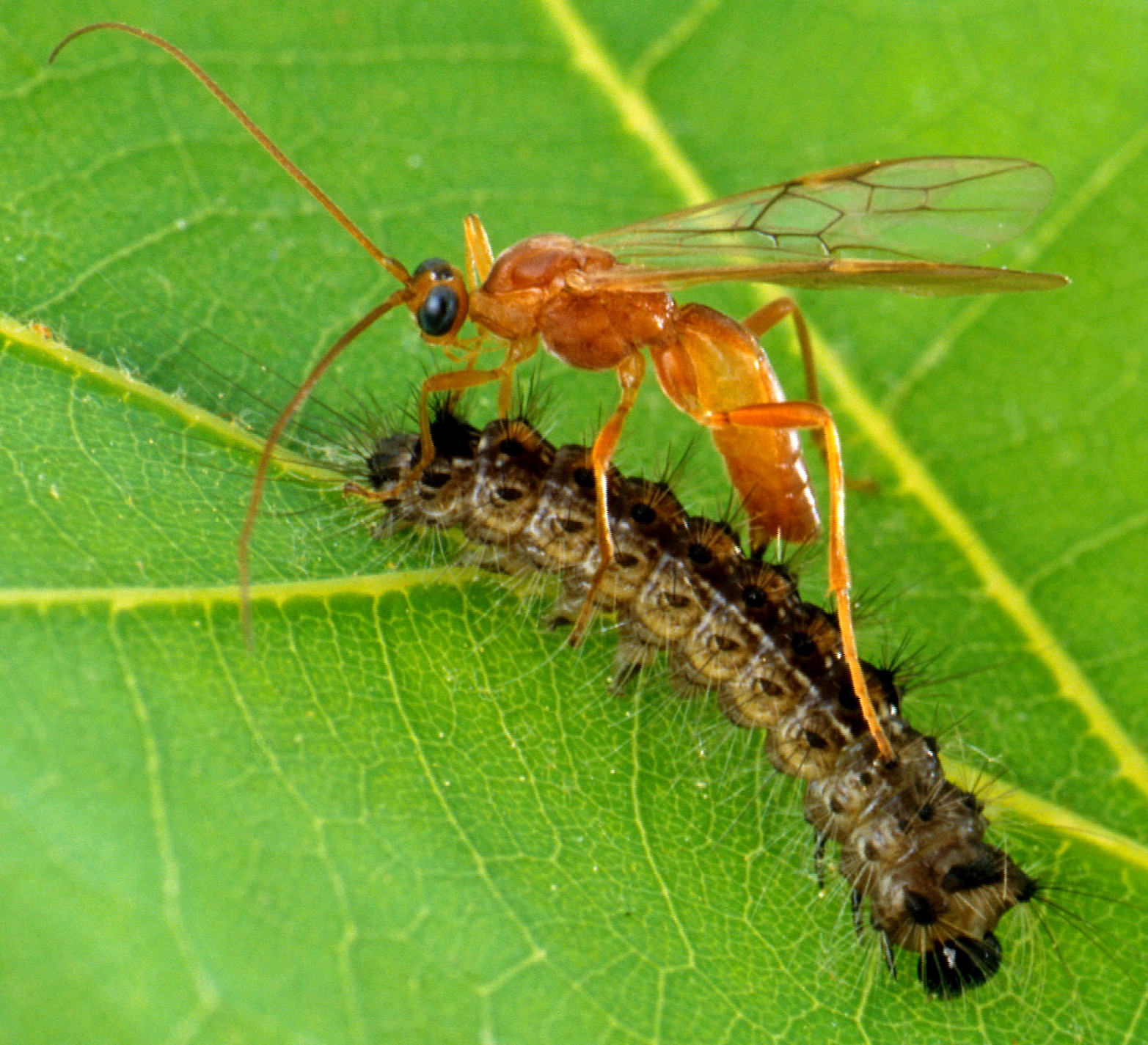
- Aleiodes indiscretus

Scientific classification
- Domain: Eukaryota
- Kingdom: Animalia
- Phylum: Arthropoda
- Class: Insecta
- Order: Hymenoptera
- Family: Braconidae
- Subfamily: Rogadinae; Foerster, 1863

= Rogadinae =

Subfamily of wasps

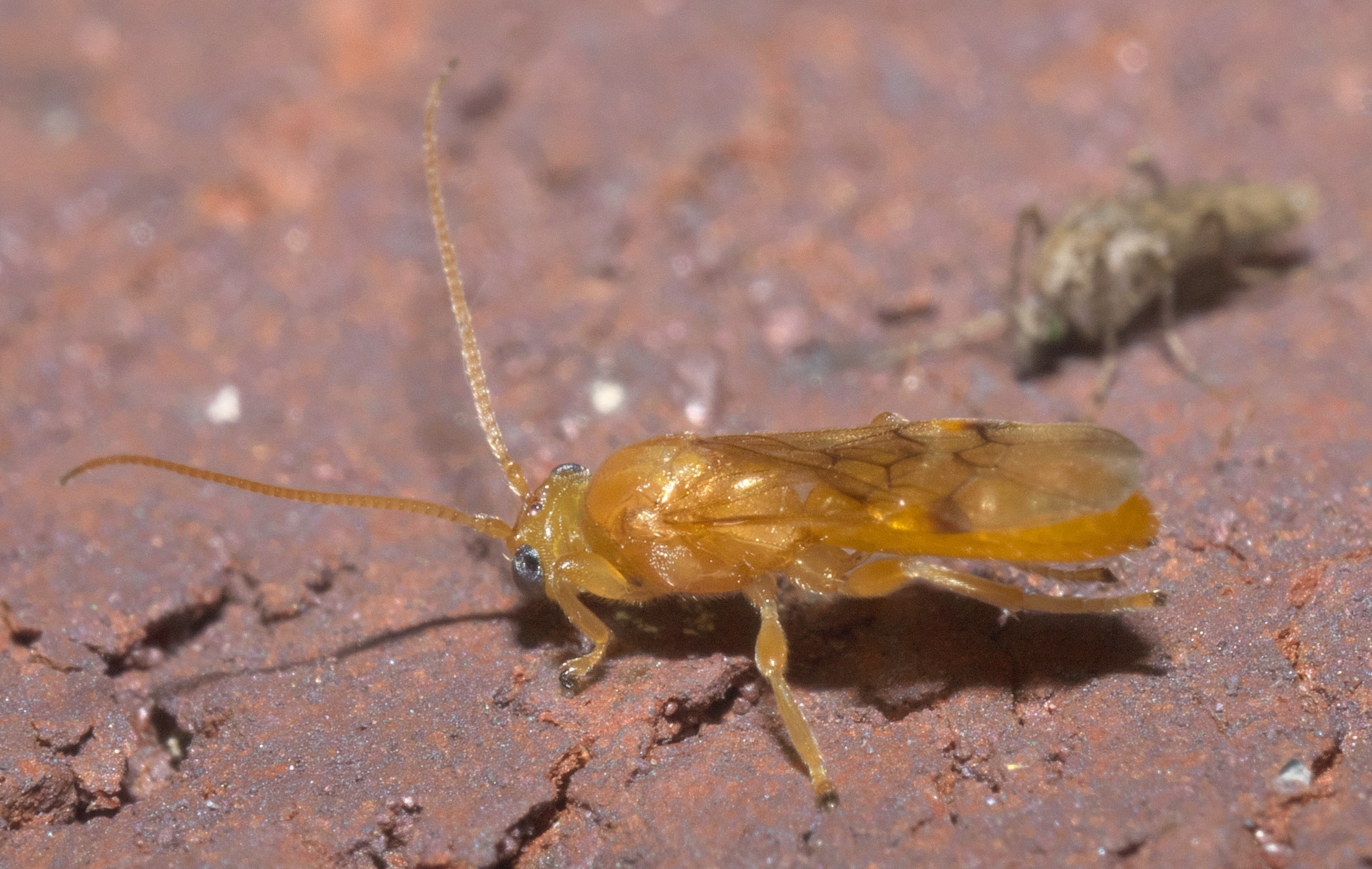
Yelicones delicatus

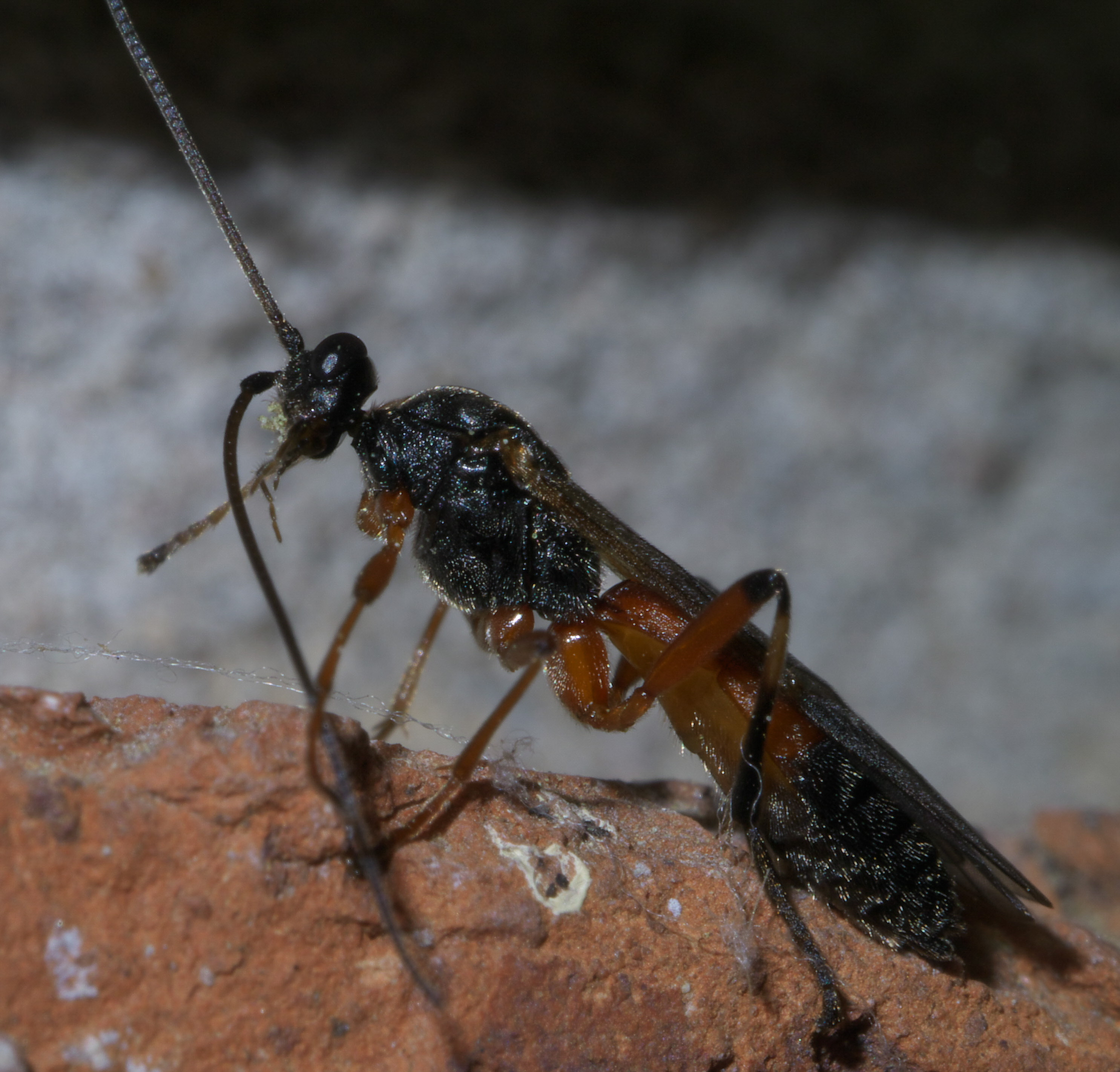
Aleiodes

The Rogadinae are a large subfamily of braconid parasitoid wasps. Several Rogadinae species parasitize pest caterpillars and are important for naturally occurring biological control.

== Description and distribution ==
Rogadinae are small wasps, usually under 8mm long. They are cyclostomes and usually have a medial ridge on the abdomen. They are found worldwide. The cosmopolitan genus Aleiodes, Old World genus Rogas, and New World genus Triraphis are by far the most common and species rich.

== Biology ==
Rogadinae are koinobiont endoparasitoids of Lepidopteran larvae. Females oviposit into host larvae. The host is allowed to develop as the wasp larvae feeds internally on its tissues. Rogadines are unique among braconids in that their host caterpillar is eventually reduced to a mummified husk. The wasp larva then pupate within the mummy. Host mummies are distinctive and can be used to identify the species. Many Rogadinae are nocturnal as adults.

== Genera ==
The following tribes and genera belong to the subfamily Rogadinae:

=== Tribe: Aleiodini ===
- Aleiodes Wesmael, 1838 – World
- Heterogamus Wesmael, 1838 – World
- Pararrhyssalus Cameron, 1911 – Neotropical

=== Tribe: Betylobraconini ===
- Betylobracon Tobias, 1979 – Australasian
- Mesocentrus Szepligeti, 1900 – Australasian
- Pilichremylus Belokobylskij, 1992 – Australasian

=== Tribe: Clinocentrini ===
- Anachyra van Achterberg, 1995 – Australasian
- Artocella van Achterberg, 1980 – Palearctic
- Clinocentrus Haliday, 1833 – World
- Confusocentrus Quicke & Butcher, 2011 – Oriental
- Kerevata Belokobylskij, 1999 – Australasian
- Tebennotoma Enderlein, 1912 – Old World

=== Tribe: Facitorini ===
- Conobregma van Achterberg, 1995 – World
- Facitorus van Achterberg, 1995 – Oriental
- Jannya van Achterberg, 1995 – Neotropical

=== Tribe: Gondwanocentrini ===
- Gondwanocentrus Quicke & Butcher, 2015 – Neotropical
- Ghibli Shimbori et al., 2024 – Neotropical
- Racionais Shimbori et al., 2024 – Neotropical
- Soraya Shimbori et al., 2024 – Neotropical

=== Tribe: Rogadini ===
- Afrorogas Quicke, 2021 – Afrotropical
- Amanirogas Quicke, 2021 – Afrotropical
- Aspidorogas van Achterberg, 1991 – Afrotropical
- Batotheca Enderlein, 1905 – Australasian
- Batothecoides Watanabe, 1958 – Oriental
- Bequartia Fahringer, 1936 – Afrotropical
- Bioalfa Sharkey, 2021 – Neotropical
- Canalirogas Chen & van Achterberg, 1996 – Oriental, Australasian
- Colastomion Baker, 1917 – Tropical Palearctic
- Conspinaria Schulz, 1906 – Oriental, Australasian
- Cornutorogas Chen et al. 2004 – Oriental
- Cratodactyla Szépligeti, 1914 – Afrotropical
- Cystomastacoides van Achterberg, 1997 – Oriental, Australasian
- Cystomastax Szépligeti, 1904 – Neotropical
- Darnilia van Achterberg, 1989 – Oriental, Australasian
- † Digastrotheca Brues, 1933
- Gyroneuron Kokujev, 1901 – Oriental
- Gyroneuronella Baker, 1917 – Oriental
- Hermosomastax Quicke, 2021 – Neotropical
- Iporhogas Granger, 1949 – Paleotropical
- Korupia van Achterberg, 1991 – Afrotropical
- Macrostomion Szépligeti, 1900 – Pantropical
- Megarhogas Szépligeti, 1904 – Oriental
- Myocron van Achterberg, 1991 – Afrotropical
- Orthorhogas Granger, 1949 – Afrotropical
- Papuarogas Quicke, 2021 – Australasian
- Pegarthrum Cameron, 1910 – Oriental, Australasian
- Pseudogyroneuron Baker, 1917 – Oriental
- Quasimodorogas Quicke & Butcher, 2011 – Oriental
- Rectivena van Achterberg, 1991 – Afrotropical
- Rhinoprotoma van Achterberg, 1995 – Australasian
- Rhogasella Baker, 1917 – Oriental
- Rogas Nees, 1819 – Palearctic
- Rogasodes Chen & He, 1997 – Oriental
- Spinaria Brullé, 1846 – Oriental, Australasian
- Spinariella Szépligeti, 1906 – Oriental, Australasian
- Teresirogas Quicke & Shaw, 2014 – Australasian
- Trigonophatnus Cameron, 1907 – Australasian
- Triraphis Ruthe, 1855 – World
- Troporhogas Cameron, 1905 – Oriental
- Vojtechirogas Quicke & van Achterberg, 2012 – Australasian

=== Tribe: Stiropiini ===
- Choreborogas Whitfield, 1990 – New World
- Polystenidea Viereck, 1911 – New World
- Stiropius Cameron, 1911 – New World

=== Tribe: Yeliconini ===
- Bulborogas van Achterberg, 1995 – Neotropical
- Pseudoyelicones van Achterberg, Penteado-Dias & Quicke, 1997 – Neotropical
- Yelicones Cameron, 1887 – World

=== Uncertain ===
- †Cyranorogas Quicke & Butcher, 2015 – Australasian
