= Betylobraconini =

Scientific classification
- Domain: Eukaryota
- Kingdom: Animalia
- Phylum: Arthropoda
- Class: Insecta
- Order: Hymenoptera
- Family: Braconidae
- Subfamily: Rogadinae
- Tribe: Betylobraconini; Tobias, 1979

Tribe of wasps

Betylobraconini is a tribe of parasitoid wasp in the family Braconidae. It is represented across Australasia. It is the sister tribe to Gondwanocentrini.

== Genera ==
The following genera are included:

- Betylobracon Tobias, 1979 – Australasian
- Mesocentrus Szepligeti, 1900 – Australasian
- Pilichremylus Belokobylskij, 1992 – Australasian
