= Scopula epiorrhoe =

Scientific classification
- Domain: Eukaryota
- Kingdom: Animalia
- Phylum: Arthropoda
- Class: Insecta
- Order: Lepidoptera
- Family: Geometridae
- Genus: Scopula
- Species: S. epiorrhoe

Binomial name
- Scopula epiorrhoe Prout, 1935

Species of geometer moth in subfamily Sterrhinae

Scopula epiorrhoe is a moth of the family Geometridae. It was described by Louis Beethoven Prout in 1935. It is found in Japan (widely distributed, including the Ryukyu Islands) and Hong Kong.

The wingspan is 16–21 millimetres (0.63–0.83 in).
