= Yeliconini =

Scientific classification
- Kingdom: Animalia
- Phylum: Arthropoda
- Class: Insecta
- Order: Hymenoptera
- Family: Braconidae
- Subfamily: Rogadinae
- Tribe: Yeliconini van Achterberg, 1991

Tribe of wasps

Yeliconini is a tribe of parasitoid wasp in the family Braconidae. It is represented across the world. Aleiodini is the sister tribe to Yeliconini

== Genera ==
The genus Cyranorogas is likely included because of shared morphological characters with other Yeliconini genera but this is not known for certain, as molecular data has yet to be examined.

The tribe contains the following three genera:

- Bulborogas van Achterberg, 1995 – Neotropical
- Pseudoyelicones van Achterberg, Penteado-Dias & Quicke, 1997 – Neotropical
- Yelicones Cameron, 1887 – World
