= Gondwanocentrini =

Scientific classification
- Domain: Eukaryota
- Kingdom: Animalia
- Phylum: Arthropoda
- Class: Insecta
- Order: Hymenoptera
- Family: Braconidae
- Subfamily: Rogadinae
- Tribe: Gondwanocentrini; Shimbori & Zaldívar-Riverón, 2024

Type genus
- Gondwanocentrus Quicke & Butcher, 2015

Tribe of wasps

Gondwanocentrini is a tribe of parasitoid wasp in the family Braconidae. It is represented in the Neotropical region. It is the sister tribe to Betylobraconini.

== Genera ==
As of August 2024, the following genera are included:

- Gondwanocentrus Quicke & Butcher, 2015 – Neotropical
- Ghibli Shimbori et al., 2024 – Neotropical
- Racionais Shimbori et al., 2024 – Neotropical
- Soraya Shimbori et al., 2024 – Neotropical
