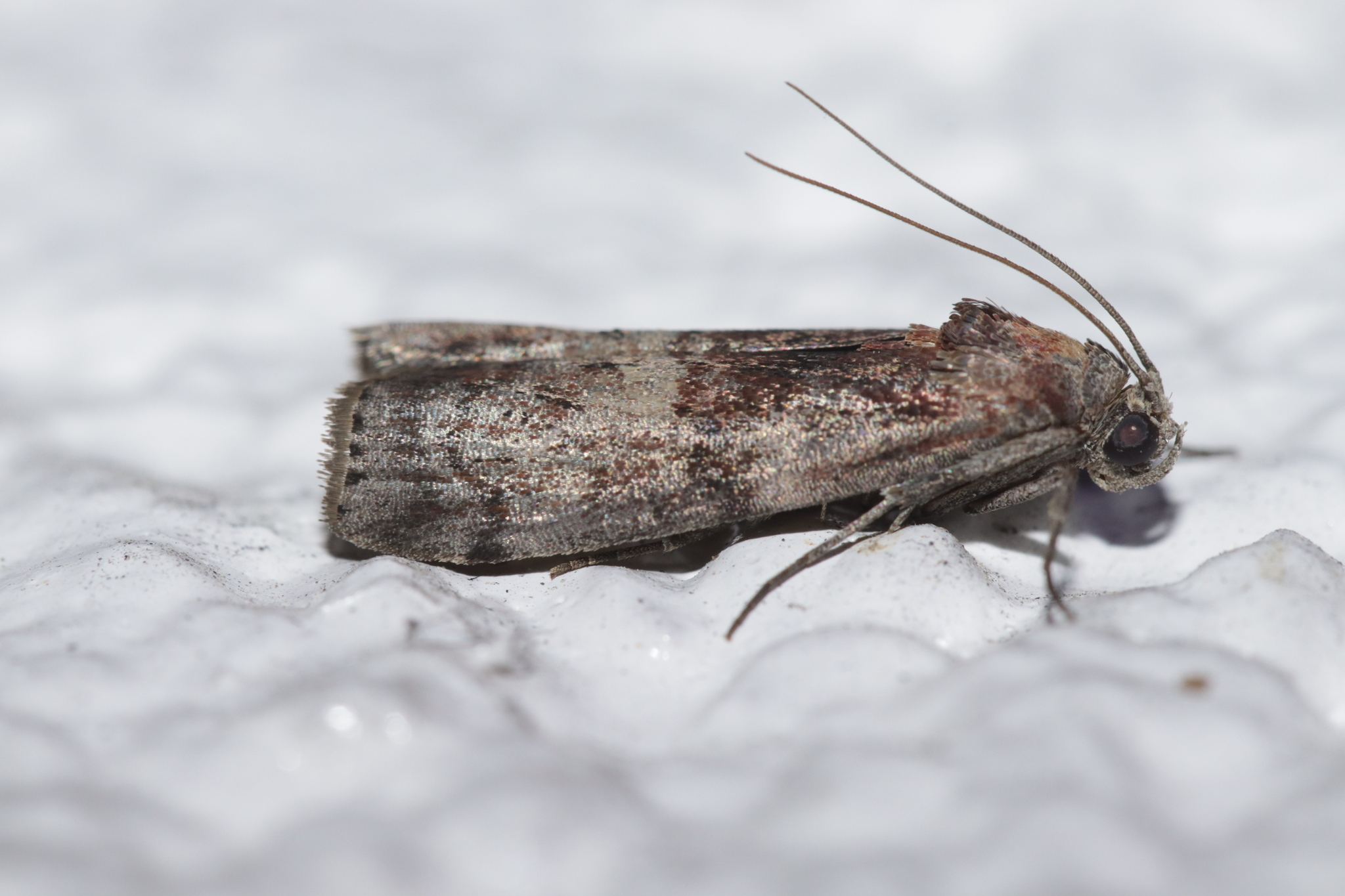
- Phycita roborella, Deutschland

Scientific classification
- Kingdom: Animalia
- Phylum: Arthropoda
- Clade: Pancrustacea
- Class: Insecta
- Order: Lepidoptera
- Family: Pyralidae
- Subfamily: Phycitinae
- Tribe: Phycitini
- Genus: Phycita; J. Curtis, 1828

Type species
- Tinea spissicella Fabricius, [1777]

Synonyms
- Ceratium Thienemann, 1828 (non Schrank, 1793: preoccupied); Gyra Gistel, 1848; Phycis Fabricius, 1798 (non Artedi in Walbaum, 1792: preoccupied)

= Phycita =

Genus of moths

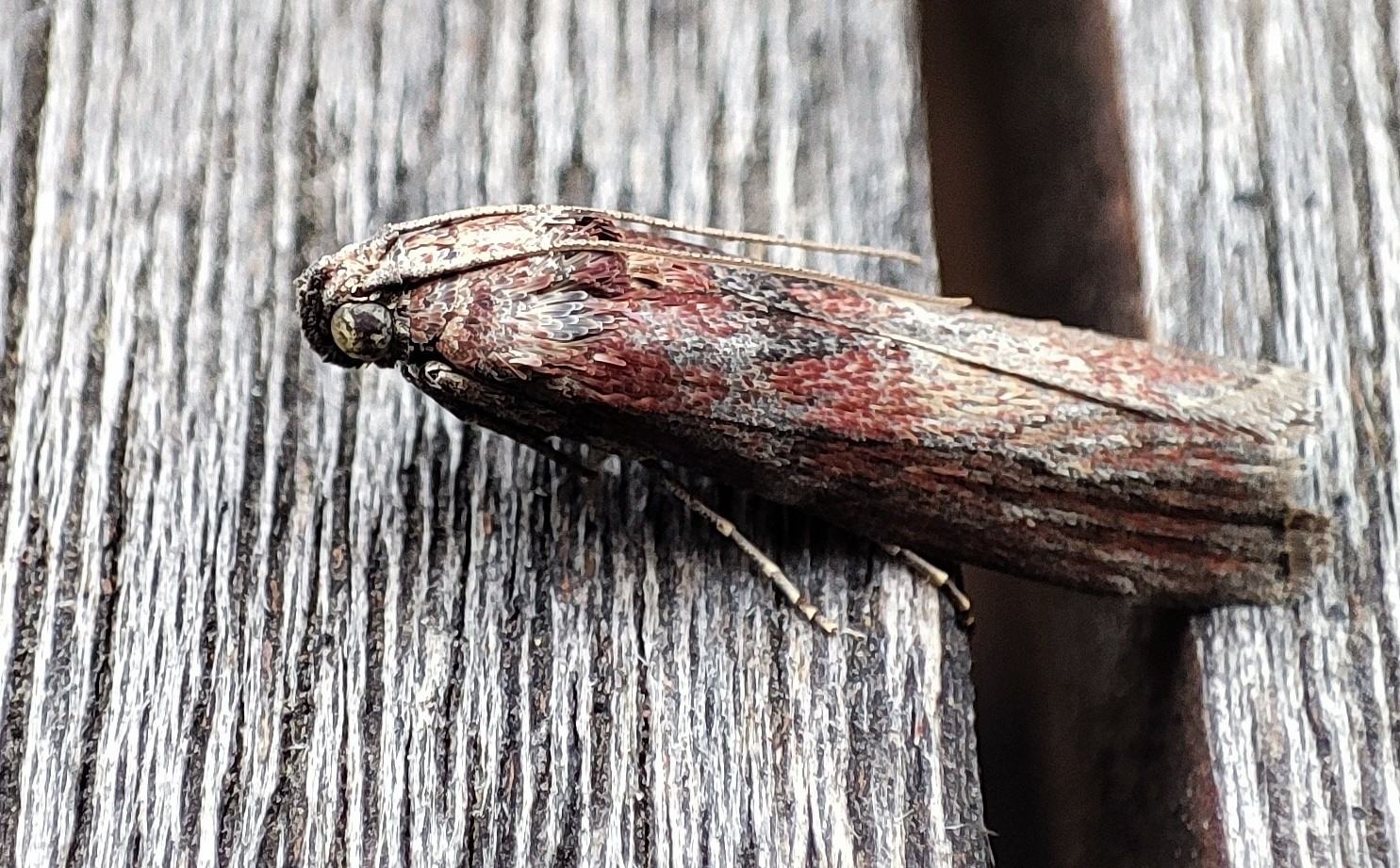
Phycita roborella, UK

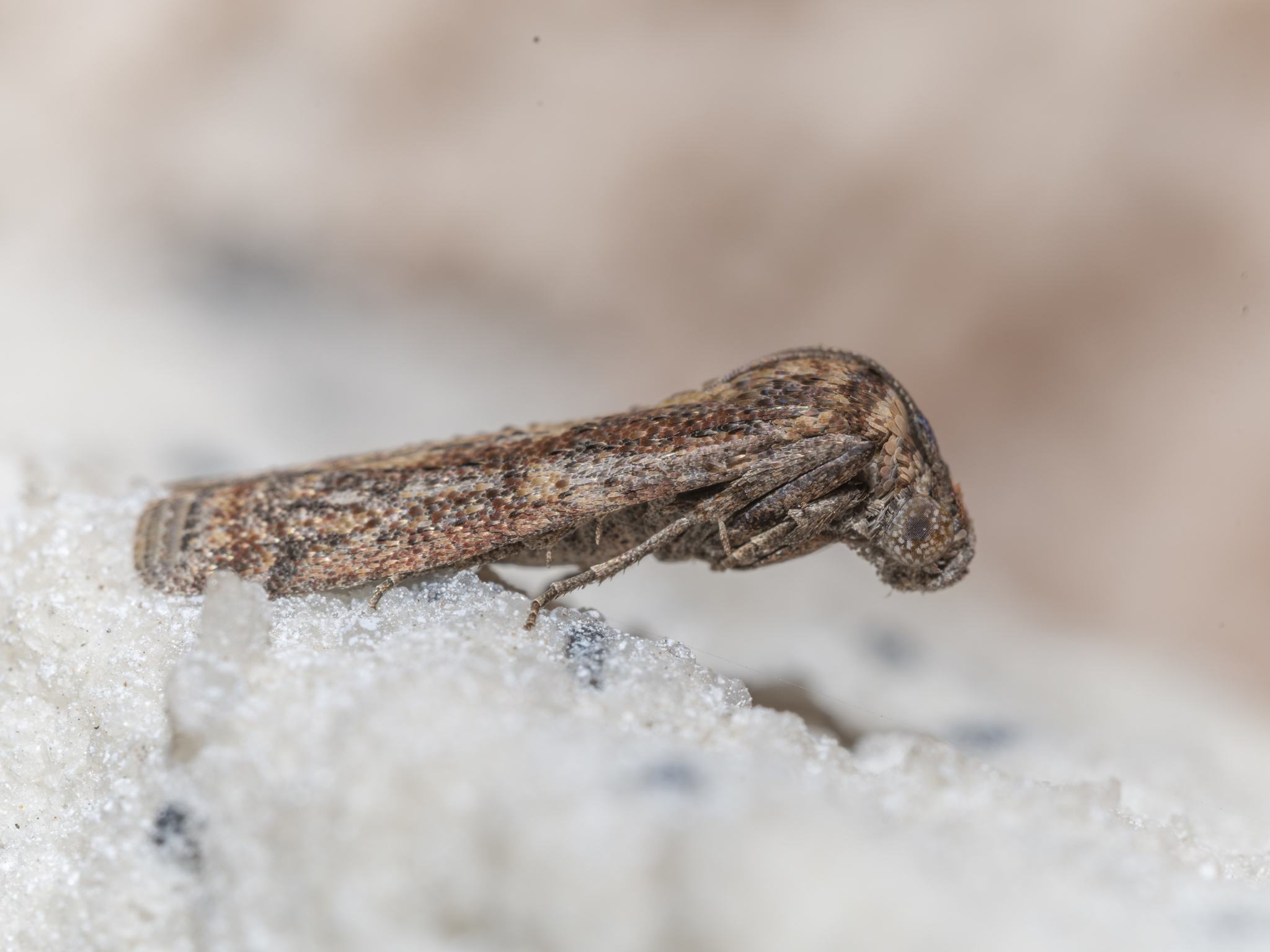
Phycita cirrhodelta, China

Phycita is a genus of small moths belonging to the snout moth family (Pyralidae). They are the type genus of their tribe Phycitini and of the huge snout moth subfamily Phycitinae.

The type species of this widespread genus is Phycita roborella, under its obsolete name Tinea spissicella. This is believed by many authors to have been described in Johan Christian Fabricius' Entomologia systematica in the 1790s. However, it appears that Fabricius described the species in his 1776/1777 Genera insectorum already. Fabricius himself established the present genus under the name Phycis.

But this name had already been used for a genus of northern hakes by Peter Artedi in his catalogue of fishes (Petri Artedi sueci genera piscium), edited and published posthumously by Johann Julius Walbaum in 1792. When this name was replaced, Fabricius' earlier description of the type species was overlooked, eventually rendering it a nomen oblitum. In any case, the same moth had been first described as Phalaena (Tinea) roborella by Michael Denis and Ignaz Schiffermüller in 1775, and thus their species name has priority over that of Fabricius. Replacement names for Fabricius' Phycis were proposed at almost the same time in 1828 by John Curtis and Ludwig Thienemann, but the latter's proposal Ceratium was also unavailable, having been established for a dinoflagellate genus by Franz von Paula Schrank in 1793. To add further confusion, some authors have claimed that Ceratium was again established for the present genus in 1848 by Johannes von Nepomuk Franz Xaver Gistel, but this is not correct – Gistel merely discussed Thienemann's and v. Schrank's names and (unnecessarily) proposed Gyra to replace the latter, adding yet another invalid name to the synonymy of Phycita.

Phycita species can be hard to tell apart from related moths in the field. The combination of 11 veins in the forewing (vein 7 missing altogether) and an upward-pointing "snout" formed by the long and straight labial palps, whose second segment is much longer than the third, may be diagnostic. The caterpillar's food plants are not comprehensively documented, but seem to include trees of the eurosids I clade and perhaps others.

== Selected species ==
These 72 species belong to the genus Phycita:

- Phycita acericola Kuznetzov, 1960
- Phycita aceris Schernijazova, 1974
- Phycita adiacritis Turner, 1904
- Phycita amygdali Schernijazova, 1974
- Phycita ardekanella Amsel, 1950
- Phycita ardentia Hampson, 1903
- Phycita asseclella Ragonot, 1893
- Phycita asselbergsi Slamka, 2019
- Phycita attenuata Balinsky, 1994
- Phycita balutchistanella Amsel, 1950
- Phycita basistrigata Amsel, 1935
- Phycita caiella Joannis, 1913
- Phycita cavifrons Meyrick, 1932
- Phycita characterica Asselbergs, 2009
- Phycita clientella (Zeller, 1867)
- Phycita clientulella Ragonot, 1893
- Phycita coronatella (Guenée, 1845)
- Phycita definalis Hampson, 1908
- Phycita demidovi Guillermet, 2007
- Phycita deodaralis Hampson, 1908
- Phycita diaphana (Staudinger, 1870)
- Phycita dinawa Kenrick, 1907
- Phycita endomelaena Hampson, 1908
- Phycita eremica Amsel, 1935
- Phycita erythrolophia Hampson, 1903
- Phycita exaggerata Balinsky, 1994
- Phycita hemipexella Hampson, 1903
- Phycita hemixanthella Hampson, 1896
- Phycita hyrcanella Amsel, 1961
- Phycita hyssarica Schernijazova, 1974
- Phycita inanitella (Ragonot, 1888)
- Phycita judaica Amsel, 1935
- Phycita kurdistanella Amsel, 1954
- Phycita lugubris Balinsky, 1994
- Phycita luxorella Caradja, 1916
- Phycita melanosticta Hampson, 1912
- Phycita meliella (Mann, 1864)
- Phycita melongenae Aina, 1983
- Phycita mianella Amsel, 1950
- Phycita michaeli Roesler & Küppers, 1979
- Phycita nagaradja Roesler & Küppers, 1979
- Phycita nephodeella Ragonot, 1887
- Phycita ochralis Hampson, 1903
- Phycita orthoclina Meyrick, 1929
- Phycita pachylepidella Hampson, 1896
- Phycita pectenella Hampson, 1896
- Phycita pectinicornella Fryer, 1912
- Phycita pedisignella Ragonot, 1887
- Phycita peliella Yamanaka, 2016
- Phycita persarum (Toll, 1948)
- Phycita phaeella Hampson, 1903
- Phycita phoenicocraspis Hampson, 1896
- Phycita phryne G. Leraut, 2019
- Phycita pirizanella Amsel, 1954
- Phycita poteriella (Zeller, 1846)
- Phycita randensis Balinsky, 1994
- Phycita rectella (Guenée, 1845)
- Phycita roborella (Denis & Schiffermüller, 1775)
- Phycita salitella Zerny, 1935
- Phycita spiculata Balinsky, 1994
- Phycita spissoterminata Balinsky, 1994
- Phycita steniella Hampson, 1903
- Phycita strigata (Staudinger, 1879)
- Phycita subdeletella (Ragonot, 1893)
- Phycita subsalitella G. Leraut, 2019
- Phycita suppenditata Balinsky, 1994
- Phycita taftanella Amsel, 1950
- Phycita teheranella Amsel, 1954
- Phycita torrenti Agenjo, 1962
- Phycita trachystola Turner, 1904
- Phycita vayu Roesler & Küppers, 1979
- Phycita venalbellus (Joannis, 1927)
- Phycita zizyphella Chrétien, 1915
