= Ghibli totoro =

Scientific classification
- Kingdom: Animalia
- Phylum: Arthropoda
- Class: Insecta
- Order: Hymenoptera
- Family: Braconidae
- Genus: Ghibli
- Species: G. totoro

Binomial name
- Ghibli totoro Shimbori & Zaldívar-Riverón, 2024

Species of wasp

Ghibli totoro is a species of parasitoid wasp in the family Braconidae, which are both discovered and found in the cloud forests of Bolivia and Ecuador.

== Etymology ==
The specific epithet "totoro" is named after Totoro from the movie "My Neighbor Totoro".
