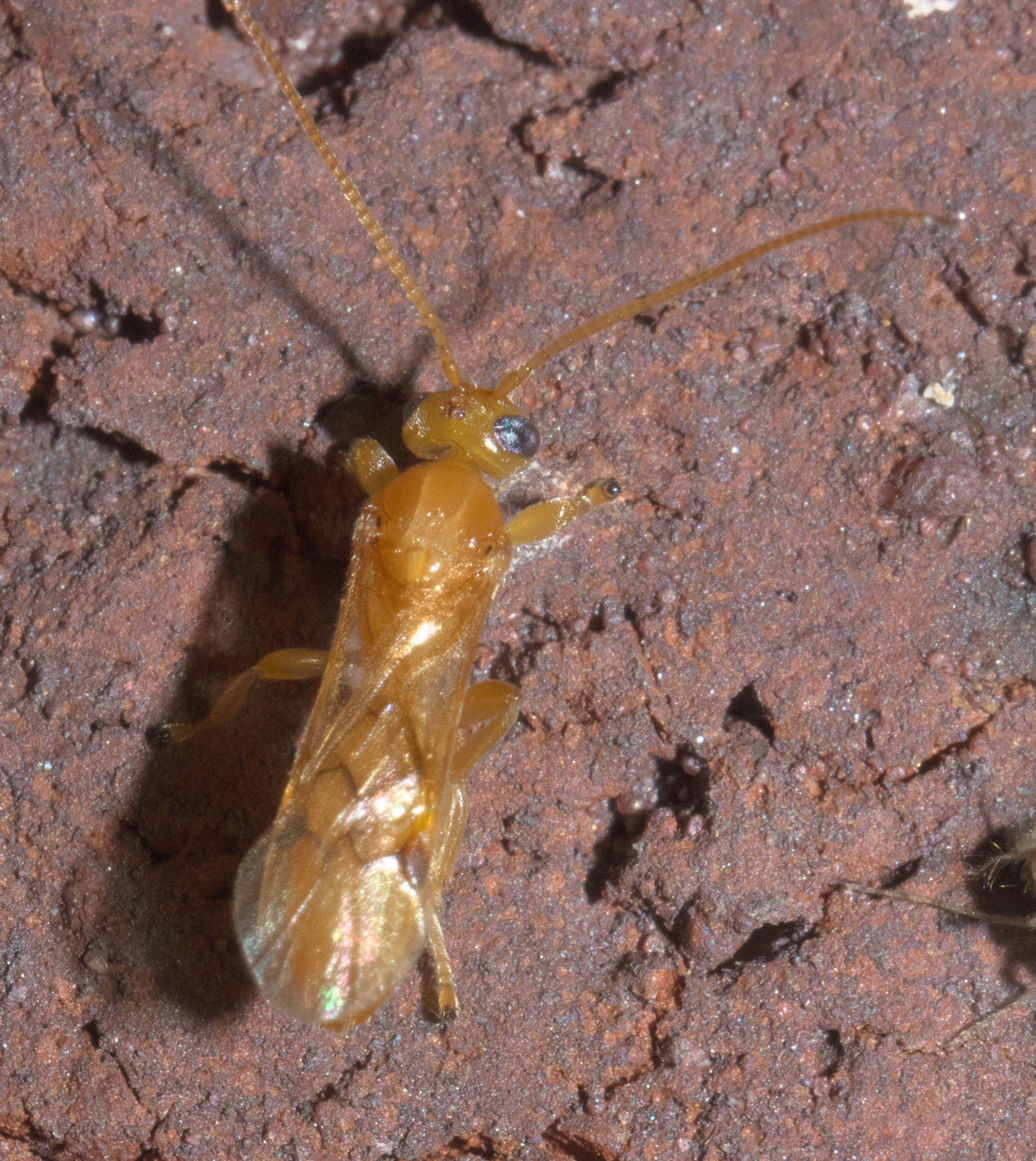
- Yelicones delicatus

Scientific classification
- Kingdom: Animalia
- Phylum: Arthropoda
- Class: Insecta
- Order: Hymenoptera
- Family: Braconidae
- Subfamily: Rogadinae
- Tribe: Yeliconini
- Genus: Yelicones; Cameron, 1887

= Yelicones =

Genus of wasps

Yelicones is a genus of wasp in the family Braconidae. There are at least 120 described species in Yelicones.

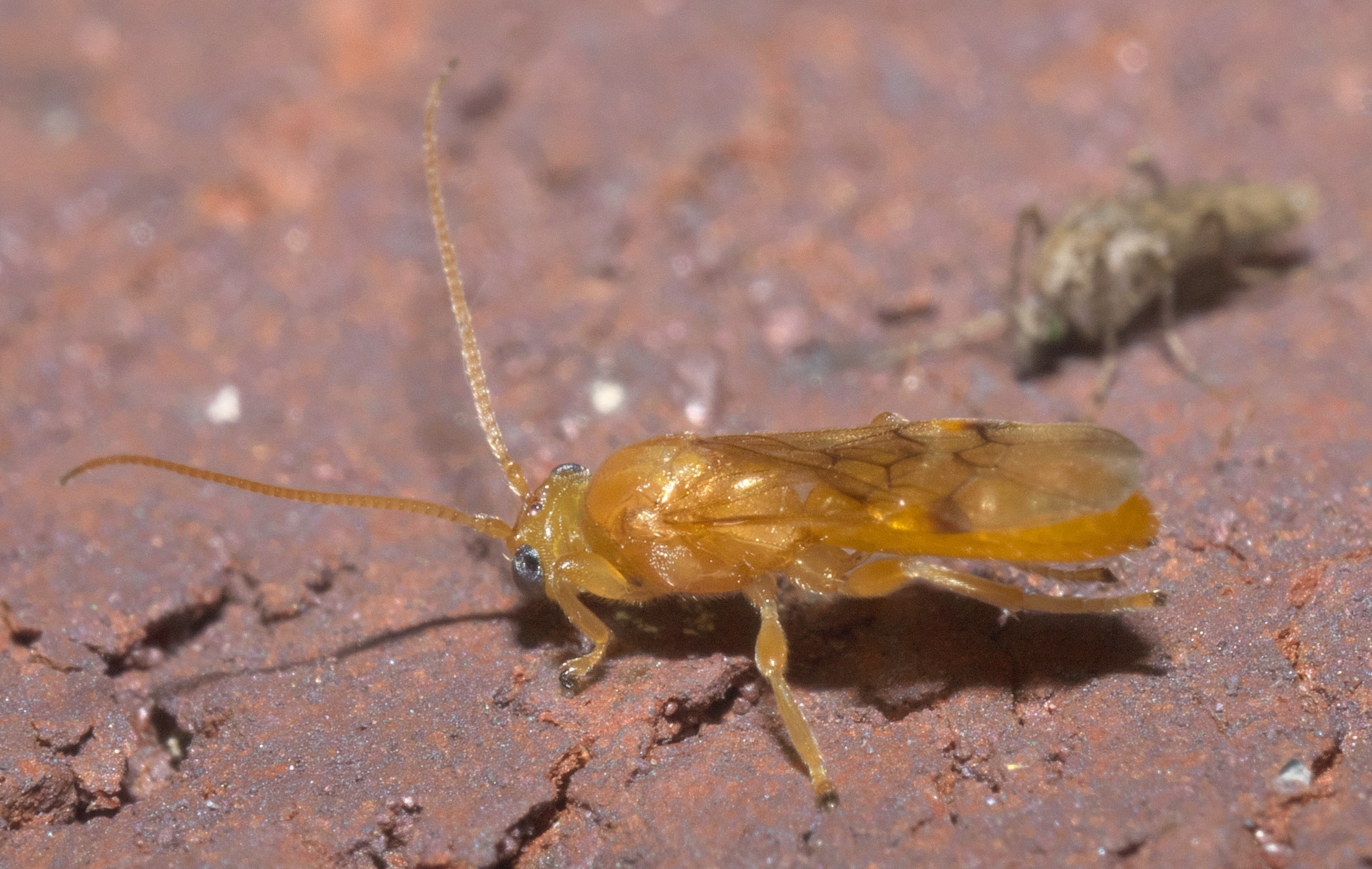
Yelicones delicatus

== See also ==
- List of Yelicones species
