= Synaphe fuscalis =

Scientific classification
- Domain: Eukaryota
- Kingdom: Animalia
- Phylum: Arthropoda
- Class: Insecta
- Order: Lepidoptera
- Family: Pyralidae
- Genus: Synaphe
- Species: S. fuscalis

Binomial name
- Synaphe fuscalis Amsel, 1966

Species of moth

Synaphe fuscalis is a species of moth of the family Pyralidae. It was described by Hans Georg Amsel in 1966 and is found in Morocco.
