= Synaphe oculatalis =

Scientific classification
- Kingdom: Animalia
- Phylum: Arthropoda
- Class: Insecta
- Order: Lepidoptera
- Family: Pyralidae
- Genus: Synaphe
- Species: S. oculatalis

Binomial name
- Synaphe oculatalis (Ragonot, 1885)

Synonyms
- Cledeobia oculatalis Ragonot, 1885; Cledeobia syriaca syriaca Rebel, 1903; Synaphe syriaca

Species of moth

Synaphe oculatalis is a species of moth of the family Pyralidae described by Émile Louis Ragonot in 1885. It is found in Spain and Turkey.

The wingspan is about 32 mm.
