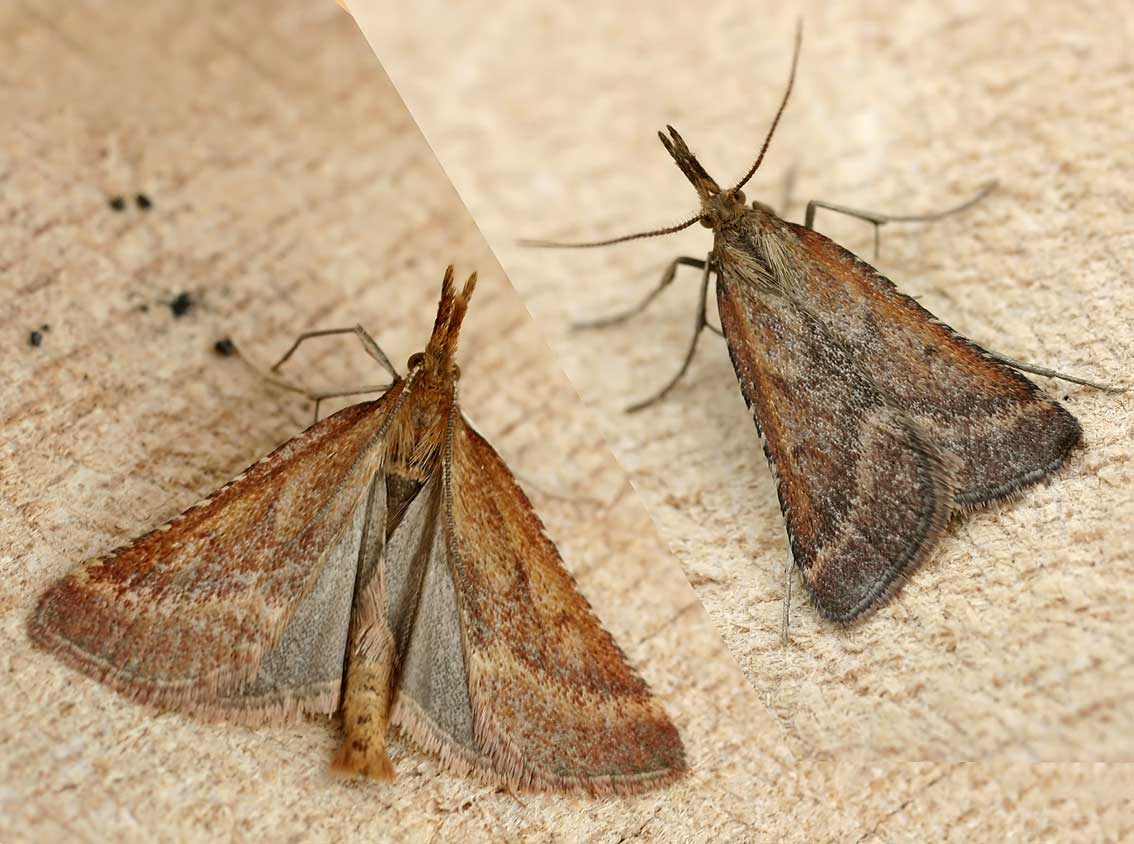

Scientific classification
- Domain: Eukaryota
- Kingdom: Animalia
- Phylum: Arthropoda
- Class: Insecta
- Order: Lepidoptera
- Family: Pyralidae
- Genus: Synaphe
- Species: S. punctalis

Binomial name
- Synaphe punctalis (Fabricius, 1775)

Synonyms
- Phalaena punctalis Fabricius, 1775; Cledeobia punctalis modestalis Rebel, 1910; Cledeobia atlantalis Zerny, 1935; Cledeobia confusalis D. Lucas, 1954; Pyralis angustalis Denis & Schiffermüller, 1775; Cledeobia angustalis ab. interrupta Kautz in Kautz, Rebel & Zerny, 1926

= Synaphe punctalis =

Species of moth

Synaphe punctalis is a moth of the family Pyralidae described by Johan Christian Fabricius in 1775. It is found in Europe.

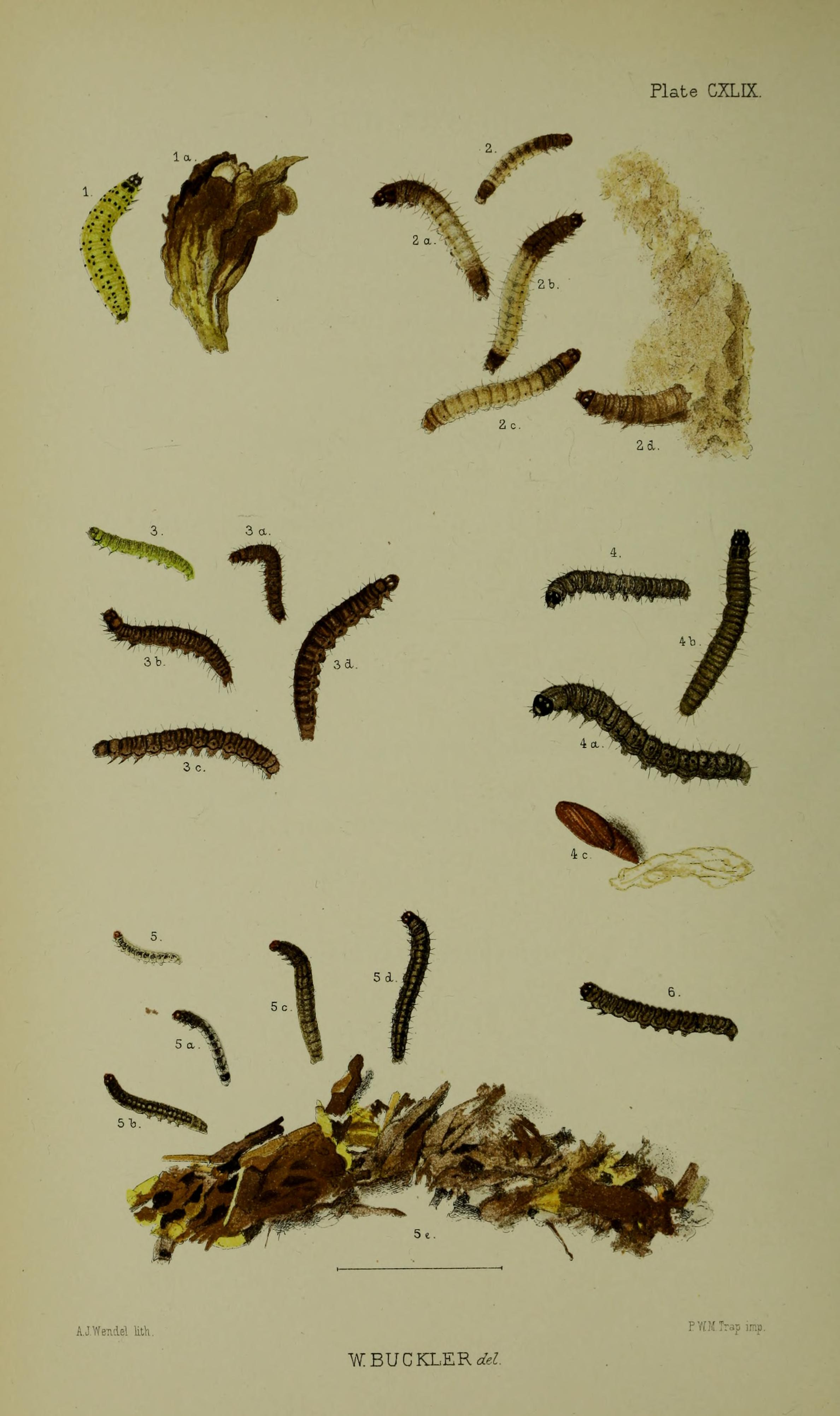
Fig 6 larva

The wingspan is 22–27 mm. The moth flies in one generation from June to August and are attracted to light.

The caterpillars feed on mosses.

== Notes ==
1. The flight season refers to Belgium and the Netherlands. This may vary in other parts of the range.
