= Synaphe infumatalis =

Scientific classification
- Domain: Eukaryota
- Kingdom: Animalia
- Phylum: Arthropoda
- Class: Insecta
- Order: Lepidoptera
- Family: Pyralidae
- Genus: Synaphe
- Species: S. infumatalis

Binomial name
- Synaphe infumatalis (Erschoff, 1874)

Synonyms
- Cledeobia infumatalis Erschoff, 1874

Species of moth

Synaphe infumatalis is a species of moth of the family Pyralidae. It was described by Nikolay Grigoryevich Erschoff in 1874. It is found in Kazakhstan.
