= Synaphe bombycalis =

Scientific classification
- Kingdom: Animalia
- Phylum: Arthropoda
- Class: Insecta
- Order: Lepidoptera
- Family: Pyralidae
- Genus: Synaphe
- Species: S. bombycalis

Binomial name
- Synaphe bombycalis (Denis & Schiffermuller, 1775)

Synonyms
- Pyralis bombycalis Denis & Schiffermuller, 1775; Synaphe bombycalis asiatica Obraztsov, 1952; Synaphe eversmanni Obraztsov, 1952; Synaphe bombycalis castanealis Leraut, 2005; Cledeobia concessoralis concessoralis Erschoff, 1874; Synaphe bombycalis consessoralis; Phalaena Bombyx austriaca Esper, 1794; Cledeobia powelli powelli Oberthür, 1925; Synaphe bombycalis provincialis Duponchel, 1831; Cledeobia bombycalis var. sepialis Caradja, 1925

Species of moth

Synaphe bombycalis is a species of moth of the family Pyralidae described by Michael Denis and Ignaz Schiffermüller in 1775. It is found in Spain, France, Austria, Italy, the Czech Republic, Slovakia, Hungary, Romania, Ukraine, Russia, Morocco, Turkey, Turkmenistan and Kazakhstan.
