= Synaphe chellalalis =

Scientific classification
- Kingdom: Animalia
- Phylum: Arthropoda
- Class: Insecta
- Order: Lepidoptera
- Family: Pyralidae
- Genus: Synaphe
- Species: S. chellalalis

Binomial name
- Synaphe chellalalis (Hampson, 1900)

Synonyms
- Cledeobia chellalalis Hampson, 1900

Species of moth

Synaphe chellalalis is a species of moth of the family Pyralidae described by George Hampson in 1900. It is found in Spain, Portugal and Algeria.

== Taxonomy ==
Synaphe predotalis is sometimes treated as a subspecies of Synaphe chellalalis.
