= Synaphe rungsi =

Scientific classification
- Domain: Eukaryota
- Kingdom: Animalia
- Phylum: Arthropoda
- Class: Insecta
- Order: Lepidoptera
- Family: Pyralidae
- Genus: Synaphe
- Species: S. rungsi

Binomial name
- Synaphe rungsi (D. Lucas, 1937)

Synonyms
- Cledeobia rungsi D. Lucas, 1937

Species of moth

Synaphe rungsi is a species of moth of the family Pyralidae. It was described by Daniel Lucas in 1937. It is found in Morocco.
