= Synaphe berytalis =

Scientific classification
- Kingdom: Animalia
- Phylum: Arthropoda
- Class: Insecta
- Order: Lepidoptera
- Family: Pyralidae
- Genus: Synaphe
- Species: S. berytalis

Binomial name
- Synaphe berytalis (Ragonot in de Joannis & Ragonot, 1889)

Synonyms
- Cledeobia berytalis Ragonot in de Joannis & Ragonot, 1889

Species of moth

Synaphe berytalis is a species of moth of the family Pyralidae. It was described by Émile Louis Ragonot in 1889. It is found in Lebanon.
