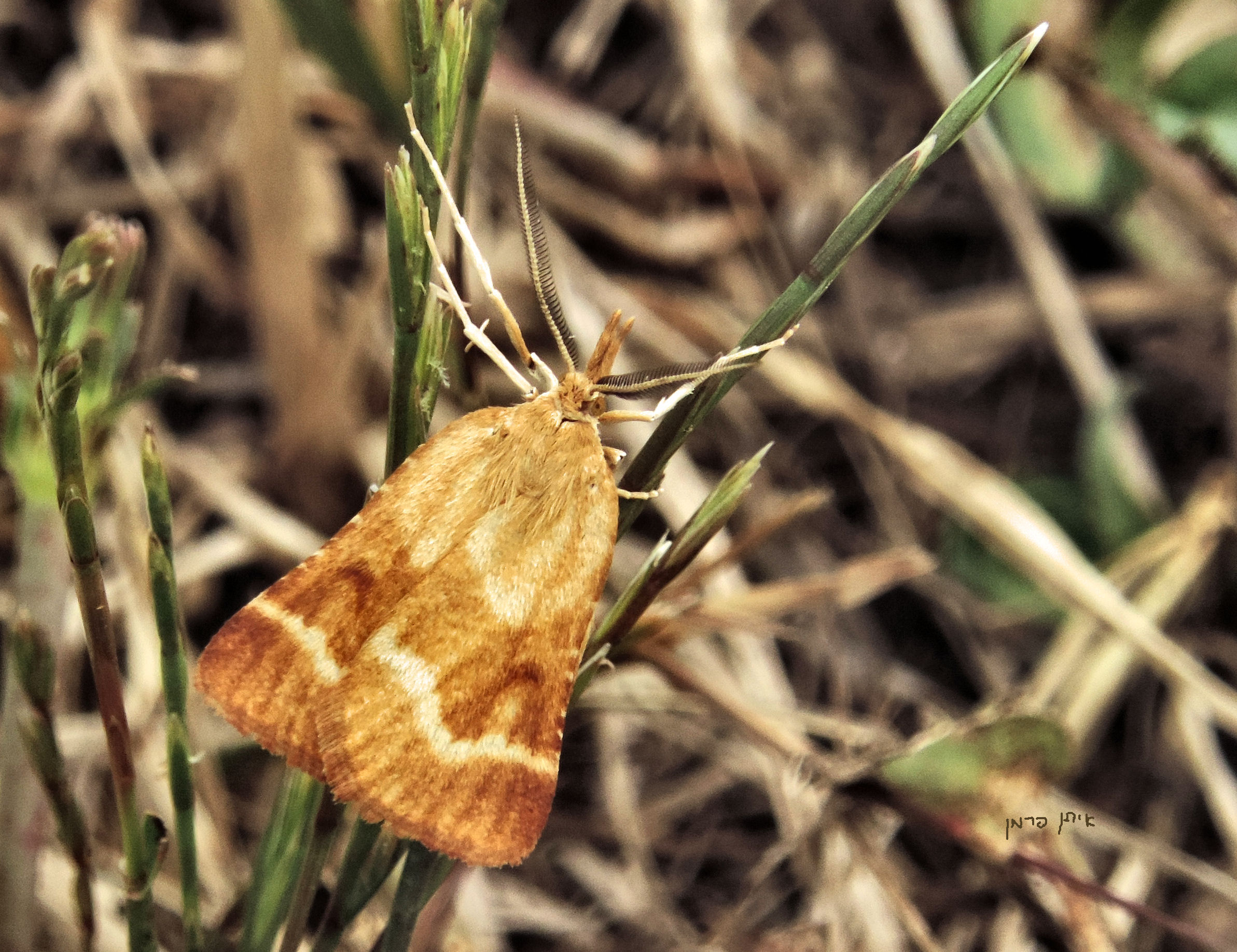

Scientific classification
- Kingdom: Animalia
- Phylum: Arthropoda
- Class: Insecta
- Order: Lepidoptera
- Family: Pyralidae
- Genus: Synaphe
- Species: S. morbidalis

Binomial name
- Synaphe morbidalis (Guenée, 1849)

Synonyms
- Cledeobia morbidalis Guenee, 1849; Cledeobia bipunctalis Hampson, 1906; Cledeobia isthmicalis Lederer, 1858

= Synaphe morbidalis =

Species of moth

Synaphe morbidalis is a species of moth of the family Pyralidae described by Achille Guenée in 1849. It is found on Sardinia.
