= Synaphe unifascialis =

Scientific classification
- Domain: Eukaryota
- Kingdom: Animalia
- Phylum: Arthropoda
- Class: Insecta
- Order: Lepidoptera
- Family: Pyralidae
- Genus: Synaphe
- Species: S. unifascialis

Binomial name
- Synaphe unifascialis (Amsel, 1961)

Synonyms
- Cledeobia unifascialis Amsel, 1961

Species of moth

Synaphe unifascialis is a species of moth of the family Pyralidae. It was described by Hans Georg Amsel in 1961 and is found in Iran.
