= Synaphe subolivalis =

Scientific classification
- Domain: Eukaryota
- Kingdom: Animalia
- Phylum: Arthropoda
- Class: Insecta
- Order: Lepidoptera
- Family: Pyralidae
- Genus: Synaphe
- Species: S. subolivalis

Binomial name
- Synaphe subolivalis (Oberthür, 1887)

Synonyms
- Cledeobia luridalis var. subolivalis Oberthür, 1887

Species of moth

Synaphe subolivalis is a species of moth of the family Pyralidae. It was described by Oberthür in 1887. It is found in Morocco.
