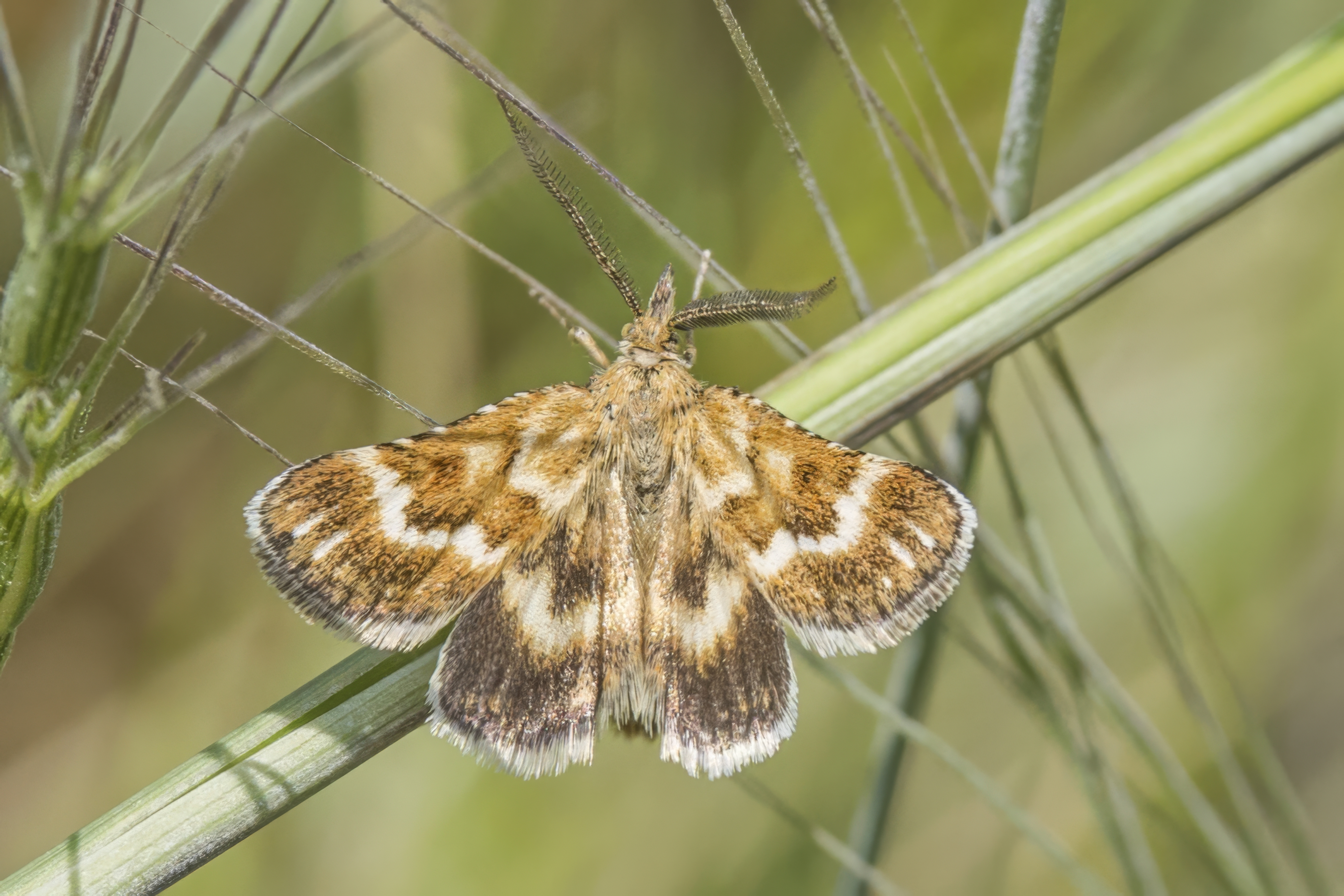
- in Turkey

Scientific classification
- Domain: Eukaryota
- Kingdom: Animalia
- Phylum: Arthropoda
- Class: Insecta
- Order: Lepidoptera
- Family: Pyralidae
- Genus: Synaphe
- Species: S. moldavica

Binomial name
- Synaphe moldavica (Esper, 1794)

Synonyms
- Phalaena Bombyx moldavica Esper, 1794; Cledeobia aberralis Guenée, 1854; Cledeobia moldavica italicalis Hartig, 1941; Cledeobia moldavica f. bertoncinii Hartig, 1941; Cledeobia moldavica schmidti Hartig, 1941; Pyralis netricalis Hübner, 1813; Cledeobia palermitalis Guenée, 1854

= Synaphe moldavica =

Species of moth

Synaphe moldavica is a species of moth of the family Pyralidae described by Eugenius Johann Christoph Esper in 1794. It is found in Portugal, Spain, Italy, Austria, Slovakia, Hungary, Croatia, Bosnia and Herzegovina, Romania, Bulgaria, North Macedonia, Albania, Greece, Moldova, Ukraine, Russia, Turkey and Iran.

The wingspan is 28–30 mm.

The larvae feed on Gramineae species.
