= Synaphe lorquinalis =

Scientific classification
- Kingdom: Animalia
- Phylum: Arthropoda
- Class: Insecta
- Order: Lepidoptera
- Family: Pyralidae
- Genus: Synaphe
- Species: S. lorquinalis

Binomial name
- Synaphe lorquinalis (Guenée, 1854)

Synonyms
- Cledeobia lorquinalis Guenee, 1854

Species of moth

Synaphe lorquinalis is a species of moth of the family Pyralidae described by Achille Guenée in 1854. It is found in Portugal and Spain.
