= Synaphe bradleyalis =

Scientific classification
- Kingdom: Animalia
- Phylum: Arthropoda
- Class: Insecta
- Order: Lepidoptera
- Family: Pyralidae
- Genus: Synaphe
- Species: S. bradleyalis

Binomial name
- Synaphe bradleyalis (Viette, 1960)

Synonyms
- Paredra bradleyalis Viette, 1960

Species of moth

Synaphe bradleyalis is a species of moth of the family Pyralidae. It was described by Pierre Viette in 1960. It is found on Madagascar.
