= Synaphe predotalis =

Scientific classification
- Domain: Eukaryota
- Kingdom: Animalia
- Phylum: Arthropoda
- Class: Insecta
- Order: Lepidoptera
- Family: Pyralidae
- Genus: Synaphe
- Species: S. predotalis

Binomial name
- Synaphe predotalis (Zerny, 1927)

Synonyms
- Cledeobia predotalis Zerny, 1927; Botys chellalalis montarcensis Dufrane, 1955; Botys chellalalis saharae Dufrane, 1955

Species of moth

Synaphe predotalis is a species of moth of the family Pyralidae described by Hans Zerny in 1927. It is found in Spain and Tunisia.

== Taxonomy ==
Synaphe predotalis is sometimes treated as a subspecies of Synaphe chellalalis.
