= Synaphe interjunctalis =

Scientific classification
- Kingdom: Animalia
- Phylum: Arthropoda
- Class: Insecta
- Order: Lepidoptera
- Family: Pyralidae
- Genus: Synaphe
- Species: S. interjunctalis

Binomial name
- Synaphe interjunctalis (Guenee, 1849)

Synonyms
- Cledeobia interjunctalis Guenee, 1849

Species of moth

Synaphe interjunctalis is a species of moth of the family Pyralidae described by Achille Guenée in 1849. It is found in Portugal and Algeria.
