= Synaphe biformis =

Scientific classification
- Domain: Eukaryota
- Kingdom: Animalia
- Phylum: Arthropoda
- Class: Insecta
- Order: Lepidoptera
- Family: Pyralidae
- Genus: Synaphe
- Species: S. biformis

Binomial name
- Synaphe biformis (Rothschild, 1915)

Synonyms
- Cledeobia biformis Rothschild, 1915

Species of moth

Synaphe biformis is a species of moth of the family Pyralidae. It was described by Walter Rothschild in 1915. It is found in Algeria.
