= Synaphe fuscochralis =

Scientific classification
- Kingdom: Animalia
- Phylum: Arthropoda
- Class: Insecta
- Order: Lepidoptera
- Family: Pyralidae
- Genus: Synaphe
- Species: S. fuscochralis

Binomial name
- Synaphe fuscochralis Leraut, 2007

Species of moth

Synaphe fuscochralis is a species of moth of the family Pyralidae. It was described by Patrice J.A. Leraut in 2007. It is found in Namibia.
