= Synaphe antennalis =

Scientific classification
- Domain: Eukaryota
- Kingdom: Animalia
- Phylum: Arthropoda
- Class: Insecta
- Order: Lepidoptera
- Family: Pyralidae
- Genus: Synaphe
- Species: S. antennalis

Binomial name
- Synaphe antennalis (Fabricius, 1794)

Synonyms
- Phalaena antennalis Fabricius, 1794; Pyralis connectalis Hübner, 1796; Pyralis luridalis Fischer von Röslerstamm, 1841

Species of moth

Synaphe antennalis is a species of moth of the family Pyralidae described by Johan Christian Fabricius in 1794. It is found in Spain, France, Austria, Italy, the Czech Republic, Slovakia, Hungary, Croatia, Bosnia and Herzegovina, Romania, Bulgaria, North Macedonia, Albania, Ukraine, Russia and Turkey.
