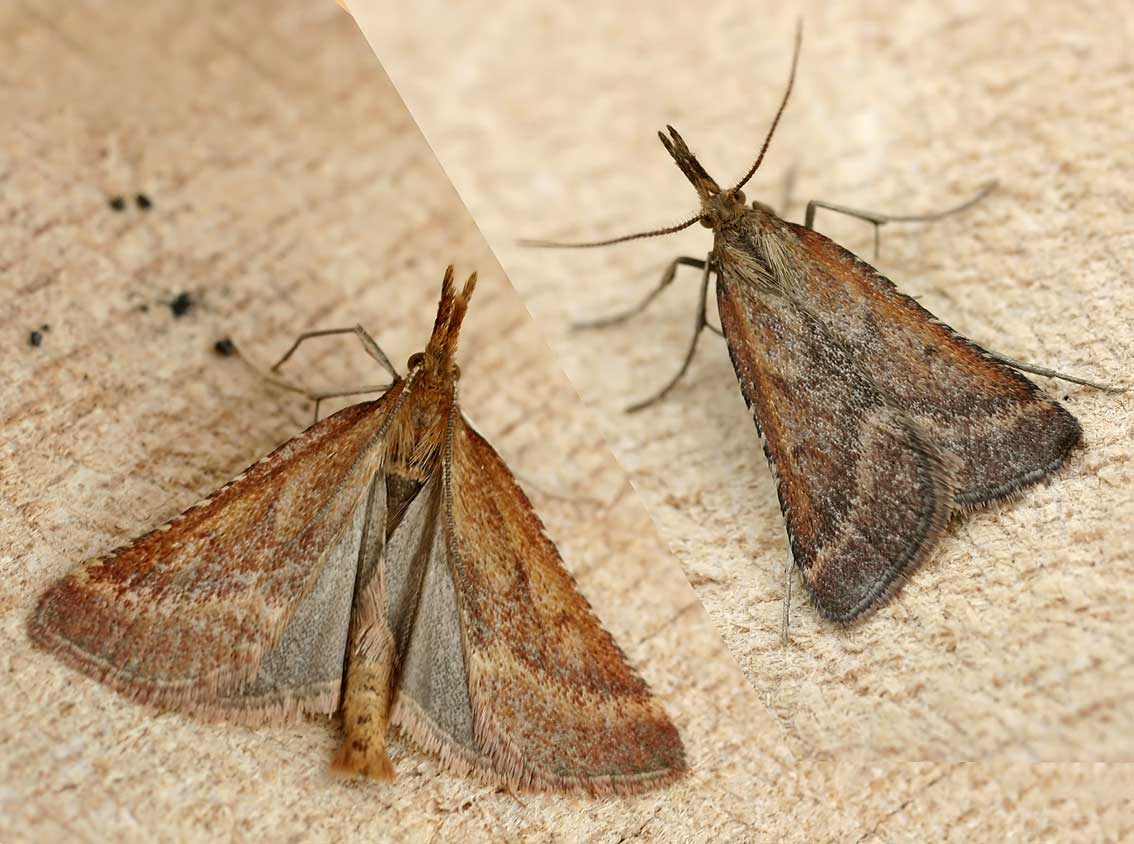
- Synaphe punctalis

Scientific classification
- Domain: Eukaryota
- Kingdom: Animalia
- Phylum: Arthropoda
- Class: Insecta
- Order: Lepidoptera
- Family: Pyralidae
- Tribe: Pyralini
- Genus: Synaphe; Hübner, [1825]

Synonyms
- Cledeobia Stephens, 1829; Idia Hübner, 1806; Mitopoda Mann, 1854; Synapha Hübner, 1826

= Synaphe =

Genus of moths

Synaphe is a genus of snout moths described by Jacob Hübner in 1825.

== Species ==
- Synaphe amuralis (Hampson, 1900)
- Synaphe antennalis (Fabricius, 1794)
- Synaphe berytalis (Ragonot in de Joannis & Ragonot, 1889)
- Synaphe biformis (Rothschild, 1915)
- Synaphe bombycalis (Denis & Schiffermüller, 1775)
- Synaphe bradleyalis (Viette, 1960)
- Synaphe chellalalis (Hampson, 1900)
- Synaphe diffidalis Guenée, 1854
- Synaphe dresnayi Leraut, 2005
- Synaphe fuscalis Amsel, 1966
- Synaphe fuscochralis Leraut, 2007
- Synaphe glaisalis (D. Lucas, 1933)
- Synaphe infumatalis (Erschoff, 1874)
- Synaphe interjunctalis (Guenée, 1849)
- Synaphe lorquinalis Guenée, 1854
- Synaphe moldavica (Esper, 1794)
- Synaphe morbidalis Guenée, 1849
- Synaphe oculatalis (Ragonot, 1885)
- Synaphe predotalis (Zerny, 1927)
- Synaphe punctalis (Fabricius, 1775)
- Synaphe rungsi (D. Lucas, 1937)
- Synaphe subolivalis (Oberthür, 1887)
- Synaphe testacealis (Rothschild, 1915)
- Synaphe unifascialis (Amsel, 1961)
