= Synaphe glaisalis =

Scientific classification
- Domain: Eukaryota
- Kingdom: Animalia
- Phylum: Arthropoda
- Class: Insecta
- Order: Lepidoptera
- Family: Pyralidae
- Genus: Synaphe
- Species: S. glaisalis

Binomial name
- Synaphe glaisalis (D. Lucas, 1933)

Synonyms
- Cledeobia glaisalis D. Lucas, 1933

Species of moth

Synaphe glaisalis is a species of moth of the family Pyralidae. It was described by Daniel Lucas in 1933. It is found in Morocco.
