= Synaphe amuralis =

Scientific classification
- Kingdom: Animalia
- Phylum: Arthropoda
- Clade: Pancrustacea
- Class: Insecta
- Order: Lepidoptera
- Family: Pyralidae
- Genus: Synaphe
- Species: S. amuralis

Binomial name
- Synaphe amuralis (Hampson, 1900)

Synonyms
- Cledeobia amuralis Hampson, 1900

Species of moth

Synaphe amuralis is a species of moth of the family Pyralidae. It was described by George Hampson in 1900. It is found in Russia.

== Distribution ==
In addition to the Russian Far East, Synaphe amuralis has been recorded from northeastern China. The first Chinese record was based on a male specimen collected on Bailangshan Mountain in Jianchang County, Liaoning Province, in May 2009.

== Description ==
The adult has a wingspan of about 21 mm. The forewings are reddish brown with white antemedial and postmedial lines, while the hindwings are dark brown to black with a white postmedial line. The antennae are brown and bipectinate.
