= Synaphe diffidalis =

Scientific classification
- Kingdom: Animalia
- Phylum: Arthropoda
- Class: Insecta
- Order: Lepidoptera
- Family: Pyralidae
- Genus: Synaphe
- Species: S. diffidalis

Binomial name
- Synaphe diffidalis (Guenee, 1854)

Synonyms
- Cledeobia diffidalis Guenee, 1854; Cledeobia castillalis castillalis Guenée, 1854; Botys joannisi Dufrane, 1955

Species of moth

Synaphe diffidalis is a species of moth of the family Pyralidae described by Achille Guenée in 1854. It is found in Spain, Portugal and France.
