= Synaphe dresnayi =

Scientific classification
- Domain: Eukaryota
- Kingdom: Animalia
- Phylum: Arthropoda
- Class: Insecta
- Order: Lepidoptera
- Family: Pyralidae
- Genus: Synaphe
- Species: S. dresnayi

Binomial name
- Synaphe dresnayi Leraut, 2005

Species of moth

Synaphe dresnayi is a species of moth of the family Pyralidae. It was described by Patrice J.A. Leraut in 2005. It is found in Korea.
