= List of moths of Italy (N-P) =

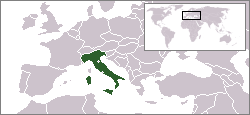
Location of Italy

Italian moths represent about 4,959 different types of moths. The moths (mostly nocturnal) and butterflies (mostly diurnal) together make up the taxonomic order Lepidoptera.

This is a list of moth species (families beginning N-P) which have been recorded in Italy, including San Marino, Sardinia, Sicily and Vatican City. Other parts of the list are at List of moths of Italy.

== Nepticulidae ==
- Acalyptris loranthella (Klimesch, 1937)
- Acalyptris maritima A. & Z. Lastuvka, 1997
- Acalyptris minimella (Rebel, 1924)
- Acalyptris platani (Muller-Rutz, 1934)
- Bohemannia pulverosella (Stainton, 1849)
- Bohemannia quadrimaculella (Boheman, 1853)
- Ectoedemia agrimoniae (Frey, 1858)
- Ectoedemia albifasciella (Heinemann, 1871)
- Ectoedemia angulifasciella (Stainton, 1849)
- Ectoedemia arcuatella (Herrich-Schäffer, 1855)
- Ectoedemia argyropeza (Zeller, 1839)
- Ectoedemia atricollis (Stainton, 1857)
- Ectoedemia caradjai (Groschke, 1944)
- Ectoedemia cerris (Zimmermann, 1944)
- Ectoedemia contorta van Nieukerken, 1985
- Ectoedemia erythrogenella (de Joannis, 1908)
- Ectoedemia gilvipennella (Klimesch, 1946)
- Ectoedemia hannoverella (Glitz, 1872)
- Ectoedemia haraldi (Soffner, 1942)
- Ectoedemia heringella (Mariani, 1939)
- Ectoedemia heringi (Toll, 1934)
- Ectoedemia intimella (Zeller, 1848)
- Ectoedemia klimeschi (Skala, 1933)
- Ectoedemia mahalebella (Klimesch, 1936)
- Ectoedemia minimella (Zetterstedt, 1839)
- Ectoedemia occultella (Linnaeus, 1767)
- Ectoedemia phyllotomella (Klimesch, 1946)
- Ectoedemia preisseckeri (Klimesch, 1941)
- Ectoedemia pubescivora (Weber, 1937)
- Ectoedemia quinquella (Bedell, 1848)
- Ectoedemia rubivora (Wocke, 1860)
- Ectoedemia rufifrontella (Caradja, 1920)
- Ectoedemia spinosella (de Joannis, 1908)
- Ectoedemia subbimaculella (Haworth, 1828)
- Ectoedemia suberis (Stainton, 1869)
- Ectoedemia turbidella (Zeller, 1848)
- Ectoedemia albibimaculella (Larsen, 1927)
- Ectoedemia louisella (Sircom, 1849)
- Ectoedemia obtusa (Puplesis & Diskus, 1996)
- Ectoedemia sericopeza (Zeller, 1839)
- Ectoedemia euphorbiella (Stainton, 1869)
- Ectoedemia groschkei (Skala, 1943)
- Ectoedemia septembrella (Stainton, 1849)
- Ectoedemia vincamajorella (Hartig, 1964)
- Ectoedemia viridissimella (Caradja, 1920)
- Ectoedemia weaveri (Stainton, 1855)
- Ectoedemia amani Svensson, 1966
- Ectoedemia atrifrontella (Stainton, 1851)
- Ectoedemia liebwerdella Zimmermann, 1940
- Ectoedemia liguricella Klimesch, 1953
- Ectoedemia longicaudella Klimesch, 1953
- Ectoedemia reichli Z. & A. Lastuvka, 1998
- Parafomoria helianthemella (Herrich-Schäffer, 1860)
- Parafomoria liguricella (Klimesch, 1946)
- Parafomoria pseudocistivora van Nieukerken, 1983
- Simplimorpha promissa (Staudinger, 1871)
- Stigmella aceris (Frey, 1857)
- Stigmella aeneofasciella (Herrich-Schäffer, 1855)
- Stigmella alaternella (Le Marchand, 1937)
- Stigmella alnetella (Stainton, 1856)
- Stigmella anomalella (Goeze, 1783)
- Stigmella assimilella (Zeller, 1848)
- Stigmella atricapitella (Haworth, 1828)
- Stigmella aurella (Fabricius, 1775)
- Stigmella basiguttella (Heinemann, 1862)
- Stigmella betulicola (Stainton, 1856)
- Stigmella carpinella (Heinemann, 1862)
- Stigmella catharticella (Stainton, 1853)
- Stigmella centifoliella (Zeller, 1848)
- Stigmella confusella (Wood & Walsingham, 1894)
- Stigmella crataegella (Klimesch, 1936)
- Stigmella desperatella (Frey, 1856)
- Stigmella dorsiguttella (Johansson, 1971)
- Stigmella dryadella (O. Hofmann, 1868)
- Stigmella eberhardi (Johansson, 1971)
- Stigmella floslactella (Haworth, 1828)
- Stigmella freyella (Heyden, 1858)
- Stigmella glutinosae (Stainton, 1858)
- Stigmella hahniella (Worz, 1937)
- Stigmella hemargyrella (Kollar, 1832)
- Stigmella hybnerella (Hübner, 1796)
- Stigmella incognitella (Herrich-Schäffer, 1855)
- Stigmella irregularis Puplesis, 1994
- Stigmella johanssonella A. & Z. Lastuvka, 1997
- Stigmella lapponica (Wocke, 1862)
- Stigmella lemniscella (Zeller, 1839)
- Stigmella lonicerarum (Frey, 1856)
- Stigmella luteella (Stainton, 1857)
- Stigmella magdalenae (Klimesch, 1950)
- Stigmella malella (Stainton, 1854)
- Stigmella mespilicola (Frey, 1856)
- Stigmella microtheriella (Stainton, 1854)
- Stigmella minusculella (Herrich-Schäffer, 1855)
- Stigmella myrtillella (Stainton, 1857)
- Stigmella naturnella (Klimesch, 1936)
- Stigmella nivenburgensis (Preissecker, 1942)
- Stigmella nylandriella (Tengstrom, 1848)
- Stigmella obliquella (Heinemann, 1862)
- Stigmella oxyacanthella (Stainton, 1854)
- Stigmella paliurella Gerasimov, 1937
- Stigmella pallidiciliella Klimesch, 1946
- Stigmella paradoxa (Frey, 1858)
- Stigmella perpygmaeella (Doubleday, 1859)
- Stigmella plagicolella (Stainton, 1854)
- Stigmella poterii (Stainton, 1857)
- Stigmella prunetorum (Stainton, 1855)
- Stigmella pyri (Glitz, 1865)
- Stigmella regiella (Herrich-Schäffer, 1855)
- Stigmella rhamnella (Herrich-Schäffer, 1860)
- Stigmella rhamnophila (Amsel, 1934)
- Stigmella roborella (Johansson, 1971)
- Stigmella rolandi van Nieukerken, 1990
- Stigmella ruficapitella (Haworth, 1828)
- Stigmella sakhalinella Puplesis, 1984
- Stigmella salicis (Stainton, 1854)
- Stigmella samiatella (Zeller, 1839)
- Stigmella sorbi (Stainton, 1861)
- Stigmella speciosa (Frey, 1858)
- Stigmella splendidissimella (Herrich-Schäffer, 1855)
- Stigmella stelviana (Weber, 1938)
- Stigmella suberivora (Stainton, 1869)
- Stigmella svenssoni (Johansson, 1971)
- Stigmella szoecsiella (Borkowski, 1972)
- Stigmella thuringiaca (Petry, 1904)
- Stigmella tiliae (Frey, 1856)
- Stigmella tityrella (Stainton, 1854)
- Stigmella tormentillella (Herrich-Schäffer, 1860)
- Stigmella trimaculella (Haworth, 1828)
- Stigmella ulmivora (Fologne, 1860)
- Stigmella vimineticola (Frey, 1856)
- Stigmella viscerella (Stainton, 1853)
- Stigmella zangherii (Klimesch, 1951)
- Trifurcula headleyella (Stainton, 1854)
- Trifurcula istriae A. & Z. Lastuvka, 2000
- Trifurcula melanoptera van Nieukerken & Puplesis, 1991
- Trifurcula montana Z. Lastuvka, A. Lastuvka & Van Nieukerken, 2007
- Trifurcula rosmarinella (Chretien, 1914)
- Trifurcula saturejae (Parenti, 1963)
- Trifurcula stoechadella Klimesch, 1975
- Trifurcula cryptella (Stainton, 1856)
- Trifurcula eurema (Tutt, 1899)
- Trifurcula ortneri (Klimesch, 1951)
- Trifurcula aurella Rebel, 1933
- Trifurcula austriaca van Nieukerken, 1990
- Trifurcula baldensis A. & Z. Lastuvka, 2005
- Trifurcula calycotomella A. & Z. Lastuvka, 1997
- Trifurcula cytisanthi A. & Z. Lastuvka, 2005
- Trifurcula etnensis A. & Z. Lastuvka, 2005
- Trifurcula immundella (Zeller, 1839)
- Trifurcula josefklimeschi van Nieukerken, 1990
- Trifurcula moravica Z. & A. Lastuvka, 1994
- Trifurcula orientella Klimesch, 1953
- Trifurcula pallidella (Duponchel, 1843)
- Trifurcula silviae van Nieukerken, 1990
- Trifurcula subnitidella (Duponchel, 1843)
- Trifurcula trasaghica A. & Z. Lastuvka, 2005

== Noctuidae ==
- Abrostola agnorista Dufay, 1956
- Abrostola asclepiadis (Denis & Schiffermuller, 1775)
- Abrostola tripartita (Hufnagel, 1766)
- Abrostola triplasia (Linnaeus, 1758)
- Acontia lucida (Hufnagel, 1766)
- Acontia trabealis (Scopoli, 1763)
- Acontiola moldavicola (Herrich-Schäffer, 1851)
- Acosmetia caliginosa (Hübner, 1813)
- Acronicta aceris (Linnaeus, 1758)
- Acronicta leporina (Linnaeus, 1758)
- Acronicta strigosa (Denis & Schiffermuller, 1775)
- Acronicta alni (Linnaeus, 1767)
- Acronicta cuspis (Hübner, 1813)
- Acronicta psi (Linnaeus, 1758)
- Acronicta tridens (Denis & Schiffermuller, 1775)
- Acronicta auricoma (Denis & Schiffermuller, 1775)
- Acronicta euphorbiae (Denis & Schiffermuller, 1775)
- Acronicta menyanthidis (Esper, 1789)
- Acronicta rumicis (Linnaeus, 1758)
- Actebia praecox (Linnaeus, 1758)
- Actebia multifida (Lederer, 1870)
- Actinotia polyodon (Clerck, 1759)
- Actinotia radiosa (Esper, 1804)
- Aedia funesta (Esper, 1786)
- Aedia leucomelas (Linnaeus, 1758)
- Aegle agatha (Staudinger, 1861)
- Aegle kaekeritziana (Hübner, 1799)
- Aegle semicana (Esper, 1798)
- Agrochola lychnidis (Denis & Schiffermuller, 1775)
- Agrochola helvola (Linnaeus, 1758)
- Agrochola humilis (Denis & Schiffermuller, 1775)
- Agrochola kindermannii (Fischer v. Röslerstamm, 1837)
- Agrochola litura (Linnaeus, 1758)
- Agrochola lunosa (Haworth, 1809)
- Agrochola meridionalis (Staudinger, 1871)
- Agrochola orejoni Agenjo, 1951
- Agrochola pistacinoides (d'Aubuisson, 1867)
- Agrochola prolai Berio, 1976
- Agrochola haematidea (Duponchel, 1827)
- Agrochola blidaensis (Stertz, 1915)
- Agrochola lota (Clerck, 1759)
- Agrochola macilenta (Hübner, 1809)
- Agrochola laevis (Hübner, 1803)
- Agrochola circellaris (Hufnagel, 1766)
- Agrotis bigramma (Esper, 1790)
- Agrotis catalaunensis (Milliere, 1873)
- Agrotis cinerea (Denis & Schiffermuller, 1775)
- Agrotis clavis (Hufnagel, 1766)
- Agrotis endogaea Boisduval, 1834
- Agrotis exclamationis (Linnaeus, 1758)
- Agrotis fatidica (Hübner, 1824)
- Agrotis ipsilon (Hufnagel, 1766)
- Agrotis lata Treitschke, 1835
- Agrotis obesa Boisduval, 1829
- Agrotis proverai Zilli, Fibiger, Ronkay & Yela, 2010
- Agrotis puta (Hübner, 1803)
- Agrotis schawerdai Bytinski-Salz, 1937
- Agrotis segetum (Denis & Schiffermuller, 1775)
- Agrotis simplonia (Geyer, 1832)
- Agrotis spinifera (Hübner, 1808)
- Agrotis trux (Hübner, 1824)
- Agrotis turatii Standfuss, 1888
- Agrotis vestigialis (Hufnagel, 1766)
- Allophyes corsica (Spuler, 1905)
- Allophyes oxyacanthae (Linnaeus, 1758)
- Alvaradoia numerica (Boisduval, 1840)
- Amephana anarrhini (Duponchel, 1840)
- Amephana aurita (Fabricius, 1787)
- Ammoconia caecimacula (Denis & Schiffermuller, 1775)
- Ammoconia senex (Geyer, 1828)
- Ammopolia witzenmanni (Standfuss, 1890)
- Amphipoea fucosa (Freyer, 1830)
- Amphipoea oculea (Linnaeus, 1761)
- Amphipyra berbera Rungs, 1949
- Amphipyra effusa Boisduval, 1828
- Amphipyra livida (Denis & Schiffermuller, 1775)
- Amphipyra perflua (Fabricius, 1787)
- Amphipyra pyramidea (Linnaeus, 1758)
- Amphipyra tetra (Fabricius, 1787)
- Amphipyra tragopoginis (Clerck, 1759)
- Amphipyra cinnamomea (Goeze, 1781)
- Anaplectoides prasina (Denis & Schiffermuller, 1775)
- Anarta myrtilli (Linnaeus, 1761)
- Anarta dianthi (Tauscher, 1809)
- Anarta melanopa (Thunberg, 1791)
- Anarta odontites (Boisduval, 1829)
- Anarta pugnax (Hübner, 1824)
- Anarta sodae (Rambur, 1829)
- Anarta stigmosa (Christoph, 1887)
- Anarta trifolii (Hufnagel, 1766)
- Anorthoa munda (Denis & Schiffermuller, 1775)
- Anthracia ephialtes (Hübner, 1822)
- Antitype chi (Linnaeus, 1758)
- Antitype jonis (Lederer, 1865)
- Antitype suda (Geyer, 1832)
- Apamea anceps (Denis & Schiffermuller, 1775)
- Apamea aquila Donzel, 1837
- Apamea arabs Oberthur, 1881
- Apamea crenata (Hufnagel, 1766)
- Apamea epomidion (Haworth, 1809)
- Apamea furva (Denis & Schiffermuller, 1775)
- Apamea illyria Freyer, 1846
- Apamea lateritia (Hufnagel, 1766)
- Apamea lithoxylaea (Denis & Schiffermuller, 1775)
- Apamea maillardi (Geyer, 1834)
- Apamea monoglypha (Hufnagel, 1766)
- Apamea oblonga (Haworth, 1809)
- Apamea platinea (Treitschke, 1825)
- Apamea remissa (Hübner, 1809)
- Apamea rubrirena (Treitschke, 1825)
- Apamea scolopacina (Esper, 1788)
- Apamea sicula (Turati, 1909)
- Apamea sordens (Hufnagel, 1766)
- Apamea sublustris (Esper, 1788)
- Apamea syriaca (Osthelder, 1933)
- Apamea unanimis (Hübner, 1813)
- Apamea zeta (Treitschke, 1825)
- Aporophyla australis (Boisduval, 1829)
- Aporophyla canescens (Duponchel, 1826)
- Aporophyla chioleuca (Herrich-Schäffer, 1850)
- Aporophyla lueneburgensis (Freyer, 1848)
- Aporophyla nigra (Haworth, 1809)
- Apterogenum ypsillon (Denis & Schiffermuller, 1775)
- Archanara dissoluta (Treitschke, 1825)
- Archanara neurica (Hübner, 1808)
- Arenostola phragmitidis (Hübner, 1803)
- Asteroscopus sphinx (Hufnagel, 1766)
- Atethmia ambusta (Denis & Schiffermuller, 1775)
- Atethmia centrago (Haworth, 1809)
- Athetis furvula (Hübner, 1808)
- Athetis gluteosa (Treitschke, 1835)
- Athetis pallustris (Hübner, 1808)
- Athetis hospes (Freyer, 1831)
- Atypha pulmonaris (Esper, 1790)
- Auchmis detersa (Esper, 1787)
- Autographa aemula (Denis & Schiffermuller, 1775)
- Autographa bractea (Denis & Schiffermuller, 1775)
- Autographa gamma (Linnaeus, 1758)
- Autographa jota (Linnaeus, 1758)
- Autographa pulchrina (Haworth, 1809)
- Axylia putris (Linnaeus, 1761)
- Brachionycha nubeculosa (Esper, 1785)
- Brachylomia viminalis (Fabricius, 1776)
- Brithys crini (Fabricius, 1775)
- Bryonycta pineti (Staudinger, 1859)
- Bryophila amoenissima Turati, 1909
- Bryophila ereptricula Treitschke, 1825
- Bryophila felina (Eversmann, 1852)
- Bryophila galathea Milliere, 1875
- Bryophila raptricula (Denis & Schiffermuller, 1775)
- Bryophila ravula (Hübner, 1813)
- Bryophila vandalusiae Duponchel, 1842
- Bryophila domestica (Hufnagel, 1766)
- Calamia tridens (Hufnagel, 1766)
- Calliergis ramosa (Esper, 1786)
- Callopistria juventina (Stoll, 1782)
- Callopistria latreillei (Duponchel, 1827)
- Calophasia almoravida Graslin, 1863
- Calophasia lunula (Hufnagel, 1766)
- Calophasia opalina (Esper, 1793)
- Calophasia platyptera (Esper, 1788)
- Caradrina germainii (Duponchel, 1835)
- Caradrina morpheus (Hufnagel, 1766)
- Caradrina gilva (Donzel, 1837)
- Caradrina vicina Staudinger, 1870
- Caradrina ingrata Staudinger, 1897
- Caradrina abruzzensis (Draudt, 1933)
- Caradrina clavipalpis Scopoli, 1763
- Caradrina flavirena Guenee, 1852
- Caradrina fuscicornis Rambur, 1832
- Caradrina noctivaga Bellier, 1863
- Caradrina selini Boisduval, 1840
- Caradrina suscianja (Mentzer, 1981)
- Caradrina wullschlegeli Pungeler, 1903
- Caradrina aspersa Rambur, 1834
- Caradrina kadenii Freyer, 1836
- Caradrina montana Bremer, 1861
- Caradrina proxima Rambur, 1837
- Caradrina terrea Freyer, 1840
- Cardepia affinis (Rothschild, 1913)
- Cardepia hartigi Parenzan, 1981
- Cardepia sociabilis (de Graslin, 1850)
- Ceramica pisi (Linnaeus, 1758)
- Cerapteryx graminis (Linnaeus, 1758)
- Cerastis faceta (Treitschke, 1835)
- Cerastis leucographa (Denis & Schiffermuller, 1775)
- Cerastis rubricosa (Denis & Schiffermuller, 1775)
- Charanyca trigrammica (Hufnagel, 1766)
- Charanyca apfelbecki (Rebel, 1901)
- Charanyca ferruginea (Esper, 1785)
- Chersotis alpestris (Boisduval, 1837)
- Chersotis anatolica (Draudt, 1936)
- Chersotis andereggii (Boisduval, 1832)
- Chersotis cuprea (Denis & Schiffermuller, 1775)
- Chersotis cyrnea (Spuler, 1908)
- Chersotis elegans (Eversmann, 1837)
- Chersotis fimbriola (Esper, 1803)
- Chersotis larixia (Guenee, 1852)
- Chersotis margaritacea (Villers, 1789)
- Chersotis multangula (Hübner, 1803)
- Chersotis ocellina (Denis & Schiffermuller, 1775)
- Chersotis oreina Dufay, 1984
- Chersotis rectangula (Denis & Schiffermuller, 1775)
- Chilodes maritima (Tauscher, 1806)
- Chloantha hyperici (Denis & Schiffermuller, 1775)
- Chrysodeixis chalcites (Esper, 1789)
- Clemathada calberlai (Staudinger, 1883)
- Cleoceris scoriacea (Esper, 1789)
- Cleonymia baetica (Rambur, 1837)
- Cleonymia yvanii (Duponchel, 1833)
- Coenobia rufa (Haworth, 1809)
- Coenophila subrosea (Stephens, 1829)
- Colocasia coryli (Linnaeus, 1758)
- Condica viscosa (Freyer, 1831)
- Conisania poelli Stertz, 1915
- Conisania renati (Oberthur, 1890)
- Conisania luteago (Denis & Schiffermuller, 1775)
- Conistra iana Zilli & Grassi, 2006
- Conistra intricata (Boisduval, 1829)
- Conistra ligula (Esper, 1791)
- Conistra rubiginosa (Scopoli, 1763)
- Conistra vaccinii (Linnaeus, 1761)
- Conistra veronicae (Hübner, 1813)
- Conistra erythrocephala (Denis & Schiffermuller, 1775)
- Conistra rubiginea (Denis & Schiffermuller, 1775)
- Conistra staudingeri (Graslin, 1863)
- Conistra ragusae (Failla-Tedaldi, 1890)
- Conistra torrida (Lederer, 1857)
- Coranarta cordigera (Thunberg, 1788)
- Cornutiplusia circumflexa (Linnaeus, 1767)
- Cosmia trapezina (Linnaeus, 1758)
- Cosmia diffinis (Linnaeus, 1767)
- Cosmia pyralina (Denis & Schiffermuller, 1775)
- Cosmia confinis Herrich-Schäffer, 1849
- Cosmia affinis (Linnaeus, 1767)
- Craniophora ligustri (Denis & Schiffermuller, 1775)
- Craniophora pontica (Staudinger, 1878)
- Cryphia fraudatricula (Hübner, 1803)
- Cryphia receptricula (Hübner, 1803)
- Cryphia simulatricula (Guenee, 1852)
- Cryphia algae (Fabricius, 1775)
- Cryphia ochsi (Boursin, 1940)
- Cryphia pallida (Baker, 1894)
- Crypsedra gemmea (Treitschke, 1825)
- Ctenoplusia accentifera (Lefebvre, 1827)
- Cucullia absinthii (Linnaeus, 1761)
- Cucullia argentea (Hufnagel, 1766)
- Cucullia artemisiae (Hufnagel, 1766)
- Cucullia asteris (Denis & Schiffermuller, 1775)
- Cucullia calendulae Treitschke, 1835
- Cucullia campanulae Freyer, 1831
- Cucullia cemenelensis Boursin, 1923
- Cucullia chamomillae (Denis & Schiffermuller, 1775)
- Cucullia cineracea Freyer, 1841
- Cucullia dracunculi (Hübner, 1813)
- Cucullia formosa Rogenhofer, 1860
- Cucullia gnaphalii (Hübner, 1813)
- Cucullia hartigi G. Ronkay & L. Ronkay, 1988
- Cucullia lactucae (Denis & Schiffermuller, 1775)
- Cucullia lucifuga (Denis & Schiffermuller, 1775)
- Cucullia santolinae Rambur, 1834
- Cucullia santonici (Hübner, 1813)
- Cucullia tanaceti (Denis & Schiffermuller, 1775)
- Cucullia umbratica (Linnaeus, 1758)
- Cucullia xeranthemi Boisduval, 1840
- Cucullia blattariae (Esper, 1790)
- Cucullia caninae Rambur, 1833
- Cucullia lanceolata (Villers, 1789)
- Cucullia lychnitis Rambur, 1833
- Cucullia prenanthis Boisduval, 1840
- Cucullia scrophulariae (Denis & Schiffermuller, 1775)
- Cucullia scrophulariphaga Rambur, 1833
- Cucullia verbasci (Linnaeus, 1758)
- Dasypolia ferdinandi Ruhl, 1892
- Dasypolia templi (Thunberg, 1792)
- Deltote bankiana (Fabricius, 1775)
- Deltote deceptoria (Scopoli, 1763)
- Deltote uncula (Clerck, 1759)
- Deltote pygarga (Hufnagel, 1766)
- Denticucullus mabillei (D. Lucas, 1907)
- Denticucullus pygmina (Haworth, 1809)
- Diachrysia chrysitis (Linnaeus, 1758)
- Diachrysia chryson (Esper, 1789)
- Diachrysia nadeja (Oberthur, 1880)
- Diachrysia stenochrysis (Warren, 1913)
- Diachrysia zosimi (Hübner, 1822)
- Diarsia brunnea (Denis & Schiffermuller, 1775)
- Diarsia dahlii (Hübner, 1813)
- Diarsia florida (F. Schmidt, 1859)
- Diarsia mendica (Fabricius, 1775)
- Diarsia rubi (Vieweg, 1790)
- Dichagyris flammatra (Denis & Schiffermuller, 1775)
- Dichagyris musiva (Hübner, 1803)
- Dichagyris candelisequa (Denis & Schiffermuller, 1775)
- Dichagyris celsicola (Bellier, 1859)
- Dichagyris constanti (Milliere, 1860)
- Dichagyris fidelis (de Joannis, 1903)
- Dichagyris forcipula (Denis & Schiffermuller, 1775)
- Dichagyris nigrescens (Hofner, 1888)
- Dichagyris renigera (Hübner, 1808)
- Dichagyris signifera (Denis & Schiffermuller, 1775)
- Dichagyris vallesiaca (Boisduval, 1837)
- Dichonia aeruginea (Hübner, 1808)
- Dichonia convergens (Denis & Schiffermuller, 1775)
- Dicycla oo (Linnaeus, 1758)
- Diloba caeruleocephala (Linnaeus, 1758)
- Dryobota labecula (Esper, 1788)
- Dryobotodes tenebrosa (Esper, 1789)
- Dryobotodes carbonis Wagner, 1931
- Dryobotodes eremita (Fabricius, 1775)
- Dryobotodes monochroma (Esper, 1790)
- Dryobotodes servadeii Parenzan, 1982
- Dypterygia scabriuscula (Linnaeus, 1758)
- Egira anatolica (M. Hering, 1933)
- Egira conspicillaris (Linnaeus, 1758)
- Elaphria venustula (Hübner, 1790)
- Enargia abluta (Hübner, 1808)
- Enargia paleacea (Esper, 1788)
- Enterpia laudeti (Boisduval, 1840)
- Epilecta linogrisea (Denis & Schiffermuller, 1775)
- Epimecia ustula (Freyer, 1835)
- Epipsilia cervantes (Reisser, 1935)
- Epipsilia grisescens (Fabricius, 1794)
- Epipsilia latens (Hübner, 1809)
- Episema glaucina (Esper, 1789)
- Episema grueneri Boisduval, 1837
- Episema tersa (Denis & Schiffermuller, 1775)
- Eremobia ochroleuca (Denis & Schiffermuller, 1775)
- Eremohadena chenopodiphaga (Rambur, 1832)
- Eremohadena halimi (Milliere, 1877)
- Eucarta amethystina (Hübner, 1803)
- Eucarta virgo (Treitschke, 1835)
- Euchalcia bellieri (Kirby, 1900)
- Euchalcia italica (Staudinger, 1882)
- Euchalcia modestoides Poole, 1989
- Euchalcia variabilis (Piller, 1783)
- Eucoptocnemis optabilis (Boisduval, 1834)
- Eugnorisma glareosa (Esper, 1788)
- Eugnorisma depuncta (Linnaeus, 1761)
- Eugraphe sigma (Denis & Schiffermuller, 1775)
- Euplexia lucipara (Linnaeus, 1758)
- Eupsilia transversa (Hufnagel, 1766)
- Eurois occulta (Linnaeus, 1758)
- Euxoa aquilina (Denis & Schiffermuller, 1775)
- Euxoa birivia (Denis & Schiffermuller, 1775)
- Euxoa conspicua (Hübner, 1824)
- Euxoa cos (Hübner, 1824)
- Euxoa culminicola (Staudinger, 1870)
- Euxoa decora (Denis & Schiffermuller, 1775)
- Euxoa distinguenda (Lederer, 1857)
- Euxoa eruta (Hübner, 1817)
- Euxoa hastifera (Donzel, 1847)
- Euxoa nigricans (Linnaeus, 1761)
- Euxoa nigrofusca (Esper, 1788)
- Euxoa obelisca (Denis & Schiffermuller, 1775)
- Euxoa recussa (Hübner, 1817)
- Euxoa segnilis (Duponchel, 1837)
- Euxoa temera (Hübner, 1808)
- Euxoa tritici (Linnaeus, 1761)
- Euxoa vitta (Esper, 1789)
- Evisa schawerdae Reisser, 1930
- Fabula zollikoferi (Freyer, 1836)
- Globia algae (Esper, 1789)
- Globia sparganii (Esper, 1790)
- Gortyna borelii Pierret, 1837
- Gortyna flavago (Denis & Schiffermuller, 1775)
- Gortyna franciscae (Turati, 1913)
- Gortyna puengeleri (Turati, 1909)
- Gortyna xanthenes Germar, 1842
- Graphiphora augur (Fabricius, 1775)
- Griposia aprilina (Linnaeus, 1758)
- Griposia skyvai Dvorak & Sumpich, 2010
- Hada plebeja (Linnaeus, 1761)
- Hadena irregularis (Hufnagel, 1766)
- Hadena perplexa (Denis & Schiffermuller, 1775)
- Hadena sancta (Staudinger, 1859)
- Hadena silenes (Hübner, 1822)
- Hadena adriana (Schawerda, 1921)
- Hadena albimacula (Borkhausen, 1792)
- Hadena bicruris (Hufnagel, 1766)
- Hadena caesia (Denis & Schiffermuller, 1775)
- Hadena clara (Staudinger, 1901)
- Hadena compta (Denis & Schiffermuller, 1775)
- Hadena confusa (Hufnagel, 1766)
- Hadena filograna (Esper, 1788)
- Hadena gueneei (Staudinger, 1901)
- Hadena luteocincta (Rambur, 1834)
- Hadena magnolii (Boisduval, 1829)
- Hadena vulcanica (Turati, 1907)
- Hadena tephroleuca (Boisduval, 1833)
- Haemerosia renalis (Hübner, 1813)
- Hecatera bicolorata (Hufnagel, 1766)
- Hecatera cappa (Hübner, 1809)
- Hecatera corsica (Rambur, 1832)
- Hecatera dysodea (Denis & Schiffermuller, 1775)
- Hecatera weissi (Draudt, 1934)
- Helicoverpa armigera (Hübner, 1808)
- Heliothis incarnata Freyer, 1838
- Heliothis maritima Graslin, 1855
- Heliothis nubigera Herrich-Schäffer, 1851
- Heliothis ononis (Denis & Schiffermuller, 1775)
- Heliothis peltigera (Denis & Schiffermuller, 1775)
- Heliothis viriplaca (Hufnagel, 1766)
- Helotropha leucostigma (Hübner, 1808)
- Hoplodrina ambigua (Denis & Schiffermuller, 1775)
- Hoplodrina blanda (Denis & Schiffermuller, 1775)
- Hoplodrina octogenaria (Goeze, 1781)
- Hoplodrina respersa (Denis & Schiffermuller, 1775)
- Hoplodrina superstes (Ochsenheimer, 1816)
- Hydraecia micacea (Esper, 1789)
- Hydraecia osseola Staudinger, 1882
- Hydraecia petasitis Doubleday, 1847
- Hyppa rectilinea (Esper, 1788)
- Hyssia cavernosa (Eversmann, 1842)
- Ipimorpha retusa (Linnaeus, 1761)
- Ipimorpha subtusa (Denis & Schiffermuller, 1775)
- Jodia croceago (Denis & Schiffermuller, 1775)
- Lacanobia contigua (Denis & Schiffermuller, 1775)
- Lacanobia suasa (Denis & Schiffermuller, 1775)
- Lacanobia thalassina (Hufnagel, 1766)
- Lacanobia aliena (Hübner, 1809)
- Lacanobia blenna (Hübner, 1824)
- Lacanobia oleracea (Linnaeus, 1758)
- Lacanobia splendens (Hübner, 1808)
- Lacanobia w-latinum (Hufnagel, 1766)
- Lamprosticta culta (Denis & Schiffermuller, 1775)
- Lamprotes c-aureum (Knoch, 1781)
- Lasionycta imbecilla (Fabricius, 1794)
- Lasionycta proxima (Hübner, 1809)
- Lateroligia ophiogramma (Esper, 1794)
- Lenisa geminipuncta (Haworth, 1809)
- Leucania loreyi (Duponchel, 1827)
- Leucania comma (Linnaeus, 1761)
- Leucania joannisi Boursin & Rungs, 1952
- Leucania obsoleta (Hübner, 1803)
- Leucania punctosa (Treitschke, 1825)
- Leucania putrescens (Hübner, 1824)
- Leucania zeae (Duponchel, 1827)
- Leucochlaena oditis (Hübner, 1822)
- Leucochlaena seposita Turati, 1921
- Leucochlaena turatii (Schawerda, 1931)
- Lithophane consocia (Borkhausen, 1792)
- Lithophane furcifera (Hufnagel, 1766)
- Lithophane merckii (Rambur, 1832)
- Lithophane ornitopus (Hufnagel, 1766)
- Lithophane semibrunnea (Haworth, 1809)
- Lithophane socia (Hufnagel, 1766)
- Lithophane lapidea (Hübner, 1808)
- Lithophane leautieri (Boisduval, 1829)
- Litoligia literosa (Haworth, 1809)
- Luperina dumerilii (Duponchel, 1826)
- Luperina kruegeri Turati, 1912
- Luperina nickerlii (Freyer, 1845)
- Luperina rubella (Duponchel, 1835)
- Luperina samnii (Sohn-Rethel, 1929)
- Luperina siegeli Berio, 1986
- Luperina testacea (Denis & Schiffermuller, 1775)
- Luperina tiberina (Sohn-Rethel, 1929)
- Lycophotia erythrina (Herrich-Schäffer, 1852)
- Lycophotia porphyrea (Denis & Schiffermuller, 1775)
- Macdunnoughia confusa (Stephens, 1850)
- Mamestra brassicae (Linnaeus, 1758)
- Meganephria bimaculosa (Linnaeus, 1767)
- Melanchra persicariae (Linnaeus, 1761)
- Mesapamea remmi Rezbanyai-Reser, 1985
- Mesapamea secalella Remm, 1983
- Mesapamea secalis (Linnaeus, 1758)
- Mesogona acetosellae (Denis & Schiffermuller, 1775)
- Mesogona oxalina (Hübner, 1803)
- Mesoligia furuncula (Denis & Schiffermuller, 1775)
- Metopoceras omar (Oberthur, 1887)
- Metopoceras khalildja Oberthur, 1884
- Mniotype adusta (Esper, 1790)
- Mniotype anilis (Boisduval, 1840)
- Mniotype satura (Denis & Schiffermuller, 1775)
- Mniotype solieri (Boisduval, 1829)
- Mniotype spinosa (Chretien, 1910)
- Moma alpium (Osbeck, 1778)
- Mormo maura (Linnaeus, 1758)
- Mythimna riparia (Rambur, 1829)
- Mythimna albipuncta (Denis & Schiffermuller, 1775)
- Mythimna congrua (Hübner, 1817)
- Mythimna ferrago (Fabricius, 1787)
- Mythimna l-album (Linnaeus, 1767)
- Mythimna languida (Walker, 1858)
- Mythimna conigera (Denis & Schiffermuller, 1775)
- Mythimna impura (Hübner, 1808)
- Mythimna pallens (Linnaeus, 1758)
- Mythimna pudorina (Denis & Schiffermuller, 1775)
- Mythimna straminea (Treitschke, 1825)
- Mythimna turca (Linnaeus, 1761)
- Mythimna vitellina (Hübner, 1808)
- Mythimna prominens (Walker, 1856)
- Mythimna unipuncta (Haworth, 1809)
- Mythimna andereggii (Boisduval, 1840)
- Mythimna sicula (Treitschke, 1835)
- Naenia typica (Linnaeus, 1758)
- Noctua comes Hübner, 1813
- Noctua fimbriata (Schreber, 1759)
- Noctua interjecta Hübner, 1803
- Noctua interposita (Hübner, 1790)
- Noctua janthe (Borkhausen, 1792)
- Noctua janthina Denis & Schiffermuller, 1775
- Noctua orbona (Hufnagel, 1766)
- Noctua pronuba (Linnaeus, 1758)
- Noctua tertia Mentzer & al., 1991
- Noctua tirrenica Biebinger, Speidel & Hanigk, 1983
- Nonagria typhae (Thunberg, 1784)
- Nyctobrya muralis (Forster, 1771)
- Ochropleura leucogaster (Freyer, 1831)
- Ochropleura plecta (Linnaeus, 1761)
- Oligia dubia (Heydemann, 1942)
- Oligia latruncula (Denis & Schiffermuller, 1775)
- Oligia strigilis (Linnaeus, 1758)
- Oligia versicolor (Borkhausen, 1792)
- Olivenebula xanthochloris (Boisduval, 1840)
- Omia banghaasi Stauder, 1930
- Omia cyclopea (Graslin, 1837)
- Omia cymbalariae (Hübner, 1809)
- Omphalophana anatolica (Lederer, 1857)
- Omphalophana antirrhinii (Hübner, 1803)
- Omphalophana serrata (Treitschke, 1835)
- Opigena polygona (Denis & Schiffermuller, 1775)
- Orbona fragariae Vieweg, 1790
- Oria musculosa (Hübner, 1808)
- Orthosia gracilis (Denis & Schiffermuller, 1775)
- Orthosia opima (Hübner, 1809)
- Orthosia cerasi (Fabricius, 1775)
- Orthosia cruda (Denis & Schiffermuller, 1775)
- Orthosia miniosa (Denis & Schiffermuller, 1775)
- Orthosia populeti (Fabricius, 1775)
- Orthosia incerta (Hufnagel, 1766)
- Orthosia gothica (Linnaeus, 1758)
- Oxicesta chamoenices (Herrich-Schäffer, 1845)
- Oxicesta geographica (Fabricius, 1787)
- Pabulatrix pabulatricula (Brahm, 1791)
- Pachetra sagittigera (Hufnagel, 1766)
- Panchrysia aurea (Hübner, 1803)
- Panchrysia v-argenteum (Esper, 1798)
- Panemeria tenebrata (Scopoli, 1763)
- Panolis flammea (Denis & Schiffermuller, 1775)
- Panthea coenobita (Esper, 1785)
- Papestra biren (Goeze, 1781)
- Paradiarsia punicea (Hübner, 1803)
- Parastichtis suspecta (Hübner, 1817)
- Peridroma saucia (Hübner, 1808)
- Perigrapha i-cinctum (Denis & Schiffermuller, 1775)
- Perigrapha rorida Frivaldszky, 1835
- Periphanes delphinii (Linnaeus, 1758)
- Phlogophora meticulosa (Linnaeus, 1758)
- Phlogophora scita (Hübner, 1790)
- Photedes captiuncula (Treitschke, 1825)
- Photedes fluxa (Hübner, 1809)
- Photedes minima (Haworth, 1809)
- Photedes morrisii (Dale, 1837)
- Phragmatiphila nexa (Hübner, 1808)
- Phyllophila obliterata (Rambur, 1833)
- Plusia festucae (Linnaeus, 1758)
- Plusia putnami (Grote, 1873)
- Plusidia cheiranthi (Tauscher, 1809)
- Polia bombycina (Hufnagel, 1766)
- Polia hepatica (Clerck, 1759)
- Polia nebulosa (Hufnagel, 1766)
- Polia serratilinea Ochsenheimer, 1816
- Polychrysia moneta (Fabricius, 1787)
- Polymixis lichenea (Hübner, 1813)
- Polymixis argillaceago (Hübner, 1822)
- Polymixis dubia (Duponchel, 1836)
- Polymixis flavicincta (Denis & Schiffermuller, 1775)
- Polymixis polymita (Linnaeus, 1761)
- Polymixis rufocincta (Geyer, 1828)
- Polymixis serpentina (Treitschke, 1825)
- Polymixis sublutea (Turati, 1909)
- Polymixis xanthomista (Hübner, 1819)
- Polyphaenis sericata (Esper, 1787)
- Protolampra sobrina (Duponchel, 1843)
- Protoschinia scutosa (Denis & Schiffermuller, 1775)
- Pseudeustrotia candidula (Denis & Schiffermuller, 1775)
- Pseudluperina pozzii (Curo, 1883)
- Pseudozarba bipartita (Herrich-Schäffer, 1850)
- Pyrrhia umbra (Hufnagel, 1766)
- Rhizedra lutosa (Hübner, 1803)
- Rhyacia helvetina (Boisduval, 1833)
- Rhyacia lucipeta (Denis & Schiffermuller, 1775)
- Rhyacia simulans (Hufnagel, 1766)
- Rileyiana fovea (Treitschke, 1825)
- Schinia cardui (Hübner, 1790)
- Scotochrosta pulla (Denis & Schiffermuller, 1775)
- Senta flammea (Curtis, 1828)
- Sesamia cretica Lederer, 1857
- Sesamia nonagrioides Lefebvre, 1827
- Sideridis rivularis (Fabricius, 1775)
- Sideridis kitti (Schawerda, 1914)
- Sideridis reticulata (Goeze, 1781)
- Sideridis lampra (Schawerda, 1913)
- Sideridis turbida (Esper, 1790)
- Simyra albovenosa (Goeze, 1781)
- Simyra nervosa (Denis & Schiffermuller, 1775)
- Spaelotis ravida (Denis & Schiffermuller, 1775)
- Spaelotis senna (Freyer, 1829)
- Spaelotis suecica (Aurivillius, 1890)
- Spodoptera cilium Guenee, 1852
- Spodoptera exigua (Hübner, 1808)
- Spodoptera littoralis (Boisduval, 1833)
- Standfussiana dalmata (Staudinger, 1901)
- Standfussiana insulicola (Turati, 1919)
- Standfussiana lucernea (Linnaeus, 1758)
- Standfussiana wiskotti (Standfuss, 1888)
- Staurophora celsia (Linnaeus, 1758)
- Stilbia calberlae (Failla-Tedaldi, 1890)
- Stilbia faillae Pungeler, 1918
- Subacronicta megacephala (Denis & Schiffermuller, 1775)
- Sympistis funebris (Hübner, 1809)
- Sympistis nigrita (Boisduval, 1840)
- Syngrapha ain (Hochenwarth, 1785)
- Syngrapha devergens (Hübner, 1813)
- Syngrapha hochenwarthi (Hochenwarth, 1785)
- Syngrapha interrogationis (Linnaeus, 1758)
- Synthymia fixa (Fabricius, 1787)
- Teinoptera olivina (Herrich-Schäffer, 1852)
- Thalpophila matura (Hufnagel, 1766)
- Thalpophila vitalba (Freyer, 1834)
- Tholera cespitis (Denis & Schiffermuller, 1775)
- Tholera decimalis (Poda, 1761)
- Thysanoplusia circumscripta (Freyer, 1831)
- Thysanoplusia daubei (Boisduval, 1840)
- Thysanoplusia orichalcea (Fabricius, 1775)
- Tiliacea aurago (Denis & Schiffermuller, 1775)
- Tiliacea citrago (Linnaeus, 1758)
- Tiliacea cypreago (Hampson, 1906)
- Tiliacea sulphurago (Denis & Schiffermuller, 1775)
- Trachea atriplicis (Linnaeus, 1758)
- Trichoplusia ni (Hübner, 1803)
- Trichosea ludifica (Linnaeus, 1758)
- Trigonophora flammea (Esper, 1785)
- Tyta luctuosa (Denis & Schiffermuller, 1775)
- Ulochlaena hirta (Hübner, 1813)
- Valeria jaspidea (Villers, 1789)
- Valeria oleagina (Denis & Schiffermuller, 1775)
- Xanthia gilvago (Denis & Schiffermuller, 1775)
- Xanthia icteritia (Hufnagel, 1766)
- Xanthia ocellaris (Borkhausen, 1792)
- Xanthia ruticilla (Esper, 1791)
- Xanthia togata (Esper, 1788)
- Xanthodes albago (Fabricius, 1794)
- Xestia ashworthii (Doubleday, 1855)
- Xestia c-nigrum (Linnaeus, 1758)
- Xestia ditrapezium (Denis & Schiffermuller, 1775)
- Xestia triangulum (Hufnagel, 1766)
- Xestia alpicola (Zetterstedt, 1839)
- Xestia rhaetica (Staudinger, 1871)
- Xestia sincera (Herrich-Schäffer, 1851)
- Xestia speciosa (Hübner, 1813)
- Xestia viridescens (Turati, 1919)
- Xestia agathina (Duponchel, 1827)
- Xestia baja (Denis & Schiffermuller, 1775)
- Xestia castanea (Esper, 1798)
- Xestia cohaesa (Herrich-Schäffer, 1849)
- Xestia collina (Boisduval, 1840)
- Xestia jordani (Turati, 1912)
- Xestia kermesina (Mabille, 1869)
- Xestia ochreago (Hübner, 1809)
- Xestia sexstrigata (Haworth, 1809)
- Xestia stigmatica (Hübner, 1813)
- Xestia xanthographa (Denis & Schiffermuller, 1775)
- Xylena solidaginis (Hübner, 1803)
- Xylena exsoleta (Linnaeus, 1758)
- Xylena vetusta (Hübner, 1813)
- Xylocampa areola (Esper, 1789)
- Xylocampa mustapha (Oberthur, 1920)
- Xylomoia stangelmaieri Mikkola, 1998

== Nolidae ==
- Bena bicolorana (Fuessly, 1775)
- Earias albovenosana Oberthur, 1917
- Earias clorana (Linnaeus, 1761)
- Earias insulana (Boisduval, 1833)
- Earias vernana (Fabricius, 1787)
- Meganola albula (Denis & Schiffermuller, 1775)
- Meganola strigula (Denis & Schiffermuller, 1775)
- Meganola togatulalis (Hübner, 1796)
- Nola aerugula (Hübner, 1793)
- Nola chlamitulalis (Hübner, 1813)
- Nola cicatricalis (Treitschke, 1835)
- Nola confusalis (Herrich-Schäffer, 1847)
- Nola cristatula (Hübner, 1793)
- Nola cucullatella (Linnaeus, 1758)
- Nola kruegeri (Turati, 1911)
- Nola squalida Staudinger, 1871
- Nola subchlamydula Staudinger, 1871
- Nola thymula Milliere, 1867
- Nycteola asiatica (Krulikovsky, 1904)
- Nycteola columbana (Turner, 1925)
- Nycteola degenerana (Hübner, 1799)
- Nycteola revayana (Scopoli, 1772)
- Nycteola siculana (Fuchs, 1899)
- Pseudoips prasinana (Linnaeus, 1758)

== Notodontidae ==
- Cerura erminea (Esper, 1783)
- Cerura vinula (Linnaeus, 1758)
- Clostera anachoreta (Denis & Schiffermuller, 1775)
- Clostera anastomosis (Linnaeus, 1758)
- Clostera curtula (Linnaeus, 1758)
- Clostera pigra (Hufnagel, 1766)
- Dicranura ulmi (Denis & Schiffermuller, 1775)
- Drymonia dodonaea (Denis & Schiffermuller, 1775)
- Drymonia obliterata (Esper, 1785)
- Drymonia querna (Denis & Schiffermuller, 1775)
- Drymonia ruficornis (Hufnagel, 1766)
- Drymonia velitaris (Hufnagel, 1766)
- Furcula bicuspis (Borkhausen, 1790)
- Furcula bifida (Brahm, 1787)
- Furcula furcula (Clerck, 1759)
- Gluphisia crenata (Esper, 1785)
- Harpyia milhauseri (Fabricius, 1775)
- Leucodonta bicoloria (Denis & Schiffermuller, 1775)
- Notodonta dromedarius (Linnaeus, 1767)
- Notodonta torva (Hübner, 1803)
- Notodonta tritophus (Denis & Schiffermuller, 1775)
- Notodonta ziczac (Linnaeus, 1758)
- Odontosia carmelita (Esper, 1799)
- Paradrymonia vittata (Staudinger, 1892)
- Peridea anceps (Goeze, 1781)
- Phalera bucephala (Linnaeus, 1758)
- Phalera bucephaloides (Ochsenheimer, 1810)
- Pheosia gnoma (Fabricius, 1776)
- Pheosia tremula (Clerck, 1759)
- Pterostoma palpina (Clerck, 1759)
- Ptilodon capucina (Linnaeus, 1758)
- Ptilodon cucullina (Denis & Schiffermuller, 1775)
- Ptilophora plumigera (Denis & Schiffermuller, 1775)
- Rhegmatophila richelloi Hartig, 1939
- Spatalia argentina (Denis & Schiffermuller, 1775)
- Stauropus fagi (Linnaeus, 1758)
- Thaumetopoea pityocampa (Denis & Schiffermuller, 1775)
- Thaumetopoea processionea (Linnaeus, 1758)

== Oecophoridae ==
- Alabonia geoffrella (Linnaeus, 1767)
- Alabonia staintoniella (Zeller, 1850)
- Aplota nigricans (Zeller, 1852)
- Aplota palpella (Haworth, 1828)
- Batia inexpectella Jackh, 1972
- Batia internella Jackh, 1972
- Batia lambdella (Donovan, 1793)
- Batia lunaris (Haworth, 1828)
- Bisigna procerella (Denis & Schiffermuller, 1775)
- Borkhausenia fuscescens (Haworth, 1828)
- Borkhausenia gelechiella (Wocke, 1889)
- Borkhausenia luridicomella (Herrich-Schäffer, 1856)
- Borkhausenia minutella (Linnaeus, 1758)
- Borkhausenia venturellii Costantini, 1923
- Crassa tinctella (Hübner, 1796)
- Crassa unitella (Hübner, 1796)
- Dasycera oliviella (Fabricius, 1794)
- Denisia albimaculea (Haworth, 1828)
- Denisia augustella (Hübner, 1796)
- Denisia fuscicapitella Huemer, 2001
- Denisia luctuosella (Duponchel, 1840)
- Denisia muellerrutzi (Amsel, 1939)
- Denisia nubilosella (Herrich-Schäffer, 1854)
- Denisia ragonotella (Constant, 1885)
- Denisia rhaetica (Frey, 1856)
- Denisia similella (Hübner, 1796)
- Denisia stipella (Linnaeus, 1758)
- Endrosis sarcitrella (Linnaeus, 1758)
- Epicallima formosella (Denis & Schiffermuller, 1775)
- Esperia sulphurella (Fabricius, 1775)
- Harpella forficella (Scopoli, 1763)
- Herrichia excelsella Staudinger, 1871
- Hofmannophila pseudospretella (Stainton, 1849)
- Holoscolia huebneri Kocak, 1980
- Metalampra cinnamomea (Zeller, 1839)
- Metalampra italica Baldizzone, 1977
- Minetia criella (Treitschke, 1835)
- Minetia crinitus (Fabricius, 1798)
- Minetia labiosella (Hübner, 1810)
- Oecophora bractella (Linnaeus, 1758)
- Pleurota marginella (Denis & Schiffermuller, 1775)
- Pleurota aristella (Linnaeus, 1767)
- Pleurota bicostella (Clerck, 1759)
- Pleurota brevispinella (Zeller, 1847)
- Pleurota contristatella Mann, 1867
- Pleurota ericella (Duponchel, 1839)
- Pleurota grisea Amsel, 1951
- Pleurota planella (Staudinger, 1859)
- Pleurota proteella Staudinger, 1880
- Pleurota pungitiella Herrich-Schäffer, 1854
- Pleurota pyropella (Denis & Schiffermuller, 1775)
- Pleurota punctella (O. Costa, 1836)
- Schiffermuelleria schaefferella (Linnaeus, 1758)
- Schiffermuelleria grandis (Desvignes, 1842)

== Opostegidae ==
- Opostega salaciella (Treitschke, 1833)
- Opostega spatulella Herrich-Schäffer, 1855
- Opostegoides menthinella (Mann, 1855)
- Pseudopostega crepusculella (Zeller, 1839)

== Peleopodidae ==
- Carcina quercana (Fabricius, 1775)

== Plutellidae ==
- Eidophasia messingiella (Fischer von Röslerstamm, 1840)
- Eidophasia syenitella Herrich-Schäffer, 1854
- Plutella xylostella (Linnaeus, 1758)
- Plutella geniatella Zeller, 1839
- Plutella porrectella (Linnaeus, 1758)
- Rhigognostis annulatella (Curtis, 1832)
- Rhigognostis hufnagelii (Zeller, 1839)
- Rhigognostis incarnatella (Steudel, 1873)
- Rhigognostis senilella (Zetterstedt, 1839)

== Praydidae ==
- Atemelia torquatella (Lienig & Zeller, 1846)
- Prays citri (Milliere, 1873)
- Prays fraxinella (Bjerkander, 1784)
- Prays oleae (Bernard, 1788)

== Prodoxidae ==
- Lampronia aeripennella (Rebel, 1889)
- Lampronia corticella (Linnaeus, 1758)
- Lampronia flavimitrella (Hübner, 1817)
- Lampronia luzella (Hübner, 1817)
- Lampronia morosa Zeller, 1852
- Lampronia provectella (Heyden, 1865)
- Lampronia pubicornis (Haworth, 1828)
- Lampronia rupella (Denis & Schiffermuller, 1775)
- Lampronia standfussiella Zeller, 1852
- Lampronia stangei Rebel, 1903

== Psychidae ==
- Acanthopsyche atra (Linnaeus, 1767)
- Acanthopsyche ecksteini (Lederer, 1855)
- Acanthopsyche zelleri (Mann, 1855)
- Anaproutia comitella (Bruand, 1853)
- Anaproutia raiblensis (Mann, 1870)
- Anaproutia reticulatella (Bruand, 1853)
- Apterona crenulella (Bruand, 1853)
- Apterona helicinella (Herrich-Schäffer, 1846)
- Apterona helicoidella (Vallot, 1827)
- Apterona stauderi Wehrli, 1923
- Bacotia claustrella (Bruand, 1845)
- Bankesia conspurcatella (Zeller, 1850)
- Bijugis apistella (Rebel, 1917)
- Bijugis bombycella (Denis & Schiffermuller, 1775)
- Bijugis pectinella (Denis & Schiffermuller, 1775)
- Brevantennia adriatica (Rebel, 1919)
- Brevantennia siederi (Sauter, 1954)
- Brevantennia triglavensis (Rebel, 1919)
- Canephora hirsuta (Poda, 1761)
- Dahlica caspari Herrmann, 1984
- Dahlica exulans Herrmann, 2000
- Dahlica generosensis (Sauter, 1954)
- Dahlica leoi (Dierl, 1970)
- Dahlica lichenella (Linnaeus, 1761)
- Dahlica marmorella Herrmann, 1988
- Dahlica triquetrella (Hübner, 1813)
- Diplodoma adspersella Heinemann, 1870
- Diplodoma laichartingella Goeze, 1783
- Epichnopterix alpina Heylaerts, 1900
- Epichnopterix ardua (Mann, 1867)
- Epichnopterix kovacsi Sieder, 1955
- Epichnopterix montana Heylaerts, 1900
- Epichnopterix plumella (Denis & Schiffermuller, 1775)
- Epichnopterix pontbrillantella (Bruand, 1858)
- Eumasia parietariella (Heydenreich, 1851)
- Leptopterix dellabeffai (Hartig, 1936)
- Leptopterix hirsutella (Denis & Schiffermuller, 1775)
- Leptopterix plumistrella (Hübner, 1793)
- Leptopterix turatii (Hartig, 1936)
- Loebelia crassicornis (Staudinger, 1870)
- Luffia ferchaultella (Stephens, 1850)
- Luffia lapidella (Goeze, 1783)
- Megalophanes turatii (Staudinger, 1877)
- Megalophanes viciella (Denis & Schiffermuller, 1775)
- Montanima karavankensis (Hofner, 1888)
- Montanima venetiana Meier, 1964
- Narycia duplicella (Goeze, 1783)
- Oiketicoides febretta (Boyer de Fonscolombe, 1835)
- Oiketicoides lutea (Staudinger, 1870)
- Oiketicoides tedaldii (Heylaerts, 1881)
- Oreopsyche tenella (Ad. Speyer, 1862)
- Oreopsyche vorbrodtella (Wehrli, 1920)
- Pachythelia villosella (Ochsenheimer, 1810)
- Penestoglossa dardoinella (Milliere, 1863)
- Phalacropterix apiformis (Rossi, 1790)
- Phalacropterix graminifera (Fourcroy, 1785)
- Phalacropterix graslinella (Boisduval, 1852)
- Phalacropterix praecellens (Staudinger, 1870)
- Postsolenobia juliella (Rebel, 1919)
- Proutia betulina (Zeller, 1839)
- Pseudobankesia alpestrella (Heinemann, 1870)
- Pseudobankesia contractella Hattenschwiler, 1994
- Psyche casta (Pallas, 1767)
- Psyche crassiorella Bruand, 1851
- Ptilocephala agrostidis (Schrank, 1802)
- Ptilocephala albida (Esper, 1786)
- Ptilocephala kahri (Lederer, 1857)
- Ptilocephala muscella (Denis & Schiffermuller, 1775)
- Ptilocephala plumifera (Ochsenheimer, 1810)
- Ptilocephala pyrenaella (Herrich-Schäffer, 1852)
- Ptilocephala sicheliella (Bruand, 1858)
- Ptilocephala silphella (Milliere, 1871)
- Ptilocephala vesubiella (Milliere, 1872)
- Ptilocephala wockei (Standfuss, 1882)
- Rebelia herrichiella Strand, 1912
- Rebelia kruegeri Turati, 1914
- Rebelia sapho (Milliere, 1864)
- Rebelia surientella (Bruand, 1858)
- Rebelia thomanni Rebel, 1937
- Reisseronia hofmanni (Heylaerts, 1879)
- Reisseronia muscaelutum Kurz, Kurz & Zeller-Lukashort, 2006
- Reisseronia satanella Kurz, Kurz & Zeller-Lukashort, 2006
- Reisseronia tarnierella (Bruand, 1851)
- Sciopetris hartigi Sieder, 1976
- Siederia apenninica Herrmann, 2000
- Siederia kathrinella Herrmann, 2001
- Siederia listerella (Linnaeus, 1758)
- Siederia meierella (Sieder, 1956)
- Sterrhopterix fusca (Haworth, 1809)
- Sterrhopterix standfussi (Wocke, 1851)
- Taleporia defoliella Constant, 1895
- Taleporia politella (Ochsenheimer, 1816)
- Taleporia tubulosa (Retzius, 1783)
- Typhonia ciliaris (Ochsenheimer, 1810)

== Pterolonchidae ==
- Pterolonche pulverulenta Zeller, 1847
- Pterolonche albescens Zeller, 1847
- Pterolonche inspersa Staudinger, 1859

== Pterophoridae ==
- Adaina microdactyla (Hübner, 1813)
- Agdistis adactyla (Hübner, 1819)
- Agdistis bennetii (Curtis, 1833)
- Agdistis frankeniae (Zeller, 1847)
- Agdistis hartigi Arenberger, 1973
- Agdistis heydeni (Zeller, 1852)
- Agdistis melitensis Amsel, 1954
- Agdistis meridionalis (Zeller, 1847)
- Agdistis morini Huemer, 2001
- Agdistis neglecta Arenberger, 1976
- Agdistis paralia (Zeller, 1847)
- Agdistis protai Arenberger, 1973
- Agdistis satanas Milliere, 1875
- Agdistis tamaricis (Zeller, 1847)
- Amblyptilia acanthadactyla (Hübner, 1813)
- Amblyptilia punctidactyla (Haworth, 1811)
- Buszkoiana capnodactylus (Zeller, 1841)
- Calyciphora acarnella (Walsingham, 1898)
- Calyciphora adamas (Constant, 1895)
- Calyciphora albodactylus (Fabricius, 1794)
- Calyciphora nephelodactyla (Eversmann, 1844)
- Capperia britanniodactylus (Gregson, 1867)
- Capperia celeusi (Frey, 1886)
- Capperia fusca (O. Hofmann, 1898)
- Capperia hellenica Adamczewski, 1951
- Capperia loranus (Fuchs, 1895)
- Capperia maratonica Adamczewski, 1951
- Capperia marginellus (Zeller, 1847)
- Capperia polonica Adamczewski, 1951
- Capperia trichodactyla (Denis & Schiffermuller, 1775)
- Capperia zelleri Adamczewski, 1951
- Cnaemidophorus rhododactyla (Denis & Schiffermuller, 1775)
- Crombrugghia distans (Zeller, 1847)
- Crombrugghia kollari (Stainton, 1851)
- Crombrugghia laetus (Zeller, 1847)
- Crombrugghia tristis (Zeller, 1841)
- Emmelina argoteles (Meyrick, 1922)
- Emmelina monodactyla (Linnaeus, 1758)
- Geina didactyla (Linnaeus, 1758)
- Gillmeria ochrodactyla (Denis & Schiffermuller, 1775)
- Gillmeria pallidactyla (Haworth, 1811)
- Gypsochares baptodactylus (Zeller, 1850)
- Hellinsia carphodactyla (Hübner, 1813)
- Hellinsia didactylites (Strom, 1783)
- Hellinsia distinctus (Herrich-Schäffer, 1855)
- Hellinsia inulae (Zeller, 1852)
- Hellinsia inulaevorus (Gibeaux, 1989)
- Hellinsia lienigianus (Zeller, 1852)
- Hellinsia osteodactylus (Zeller, 1841)
- Hellinsia pectodactylus (Staudinger, 1859)
- Hellinsia tephradactyla (Hübner, 1813)
- Marasmarcha fauna (Milliere, 1876)
- Marasmarcha lunaedactyla (Haworth, 1811)
- Marasmarcha oxydactylus (Staudinger, 1859)
- Merrifieldia baliodactylus (Zeller, 1841)
- Merrifieldia leucodactyla (Denis & Schiffermuller, 1775)
- Merrifieldia malacodactylus (Zeller, 1847)
- Merrifieldia semiodactylus (Mann, 1855)
- Merrifieldia tridactyla (Linnaeus, 1758)
- Oidaematophorus constanti Ragonot, 1875
- Oidaematophorus giganteus (Mann, 1855)
- Oidaematophorus lithodactyla (Treitschke, 1833)
- Oidaematophorus rogenhoferi (Mann, 1871)
- Oxyptilus chrysodactyla (Denis & Schiffermuller, 1775)
- Oxyptilus ericetorum (Stainton, 1851)
- Oxyptilus parvidactyla (Haworth, 1811)
- Oxyptilus pilosellae (Zeller, 1841)
- Paraplatyptilia metzneri (Zeller, 1841)
- Platyptilia calodactyla (Denis & Schiffermuller, 1775)
- Platyptilia farfarellus Zeller, 1867
- Platyptilia gonodactyla (Denis & Schiffermuller, 1775)
- Platyptilia nemoralis Zeller, 1841
- Platyptilia tesseradactyla (Linnaeus, 1761)
- Porrittia galactodactyla (Denis & Schiffermuller, 1775)
- Procapperia maculatus (Constant, 1865)
- Pselnophorus heterodactyla (Muller, 1764)
- Pterophorus ischnodactyla (Treitschke, 1835)
- Pterophorus pentadactyla (Linnaeus, 1758)
- Puerphorus olbiadactylus (Milliere, 1859)
- Stangeia siceliota (Zeller, 1847)
- Stenoptilia annadactyla Sutter, 1988
- Stenoptilia aridus (Zeller, 1847)
- Stenoptilia bassii Arenberger, 2002
- Stenoptilia bipunctidactyla (Scopoli, 1763)
- Stenoptilia coprodactylus (Stainton, 1851)
- Stenoptilia graphodactyla (Treitschke, 1833)
- Stenoptilia gratiolae Gibeaux & Nel, 1990
- Stenoptilia lutescens (Herrich-Schäffer, 1855)
- Stenoptilia millieridactylus (Bruand, 1861)
- Stenoptilia mimula Gibeaux, 1985
- Stenoptilia pelidnodactyla (Stein, 1837)
- Stenoptilia pneumonanthes (Buttner, 1880)
- Stenoptilia pterodactyla (Linnaeus, 1761)
- Stenoptilia stigmatodactylus (Zeller, 1852)
- Stenoptilia zophodactylus (Duponchel, 1840)
- Stenoptilodes taprobanes (Felder & Rogenhofer, 1875)
- Tabulaephorus punctinervis (Constant, 1885)
- Wheeleria obsoletus (Zeller, 1841)
- Wheeleria spilodactylus (Curtis, 1827)

== Pyralidae ==
- Achroia grisella (Fabricius, 1794)
- Acrobasis advenella (Zincken, 1818)
- Acrobasis bithynella Zeller, 1848
- Acrobasis centunculella (Mann, 1859)
- Acrobasis consociella (Hübner, 1813)
- Acrobasis dulcella (Zeller, 1848)
- Acrobasis foroiuliensis Huemer & Nuss, 2007
- Acrobasis getuliella (Zerny, 1914)
- Acrobasis glaucella Staudinger, 1859
- Acrobasis legatea (Haworth, 1811)
- Acrobasis marmorea (Haworth, 1811)
- Acrobasis obliqua (Zeller, 1847)
- Acrobasis obtusella (Hübner, 1796)
- Acrobasis porphyrella (Duponchel, 1836)
- Acrobasis repandana (Fabricius, 1798)
- Acrobasis romanella (Milliere, 1870)
- Acrobasis sodalella Zeller, 1848
- Acrobasis suavella (Zincken, 1818)
- Acrobasis tumidana (Denis & Schiffermuller, 1775)
- Aglossa caprealis (Hübner, 1809)
- Aglossa pinguinalis (Linnaeus, 1758)
- Aglossa signicostalis Staudinger, 1871
- Alophia combustella (Herrich-Schäffer, 1855)
- Amphithrix sublineatella (Staudinger, 1859)
- Ancylosis cinnamomella (Duponchel, 1836)
- Ancylosis imitella Hampson, 1901
- Ancylosis oblitella (Zeller, 1848)
- Ancylosis sareptalla (Herrich-Schäffer, 1861)
- Anerastia incarnata Staudinger, 1879
- Anerastia lotella (Hübner, 1813)
- Aphomia sociella (Linnaeus, 1758)
- Aphomia zelleri de Joannis, 1932
- Apomyelois ceratoniae (Zeller, 1839)
- Apomyelois ehrendorferi (Malicky & Roesler, 1970)
- Asalebria florella (Mann, 1862)
- Asalebria venustella (Ragonot, 1887)
- Asarta aethiopella (Duponchel, 1837)
- Assara terebrella (Zincken, 1818)
- Bostra obsoletalis (Mann, 1884)
- Bradyrrhoa cantenerella (Duponchel, 1837)
- Bradyrrhoa confiniella Zeller, 1848
- Bradyrrhoa gilveolella (Treitschke, 1832)
- Bradyrrhoa luteola (La Harpe, 1860)
- Bradyrrhoa trapezella (Duponchel, 1836)
- Cadra abstersella (Zeller, 1847)
- Cadra calidella (Guenee, 1845)
- Cadra cautella (Walker, 1863)
- Cadra figulilella (Gregson, 1871)
- Cadra furcatella (Herrich-Schäffer, 1849)
- Catastia marginea (Denis & Schiffermuller, 1775)
- Corcyra cephalonica (Stainton, 1866)
- Cremnophila sedakovella (Eversmann, 1851)
- Cryptoblabes bistriga (Haworth, 1811)
- Cryptoblabes gnidiella (Milliere, 1867)
- Delplanqueia cortella (Constant, 1884)
- Delplanqueia dilutella (Denis & Schiffermuller, 1775)
- Denticera divisella (Duponchel, 1842)
- Dioryctria abietella (Denis & Schiffermuller, 1775)
- Dioryctria mendacella (Staudinger, 1859)
- Dioryctria pineae (Staudinger, 1859)
- Dioryctria robiniella (Milliere, 1865)
- Dioryctria schuetzeella Fuchs, 1899
- Dioryctria sylvestrella (Ratzeburg, 1840)
- Eccopisa effractella Zeller, 1848
- Elegia fallax (Staudinger, 1881)
- Elegia similella (Zincken, 1818)
- Ematheudes punctella (Treitschke, 1833)
- Ematheudes tunesiella Ragonot, 1892
- Endotricha flammealis (Denis & Schiffermuller, 1775)
- Ephestia disparella Hampson, 1901
- Ephestia elutella (Hübner, 1796)
- Ephestia kuehniella Zeller, 1879
- Ephestia unicolorella Staudinger, 1881
- Ephestia welseriella (Zeller, 1848)
- Epischnia adultella Zeller, 1848
- Epischnia illotella Zeller, 1839
- Epischnia leucoloma Herrich-Schäffer, 1849
- Epischnia plumbella Ragonot, 1887
- Epischnia prodromella (Hübner, 1799)
- Episcythrastis tabidella (Mann, 1864)
- Episcythrastis tetricella (Denis & Schiffermuller, 1775)
- Etiella zinckenella (Treitschke, 1832)
- Eucarphia vinetella (Fabricius, 1787)
- Eurhodope cirrigerella (Zincken, 1818)
- Eurhodope rosella (Scopoli, 1763)
- Euzophera bigella (Zeller, 1848)
- Euzophera cinerosella (Zeller, 1839)
- Euzophera fuliginosella (Heinemann, 1865)
- Euzophera lunulella (O. Costa, 1836)
- Euzophera osseatella (Treitschke, 1832)
- Euzophera pinguis (Haworth, 1811)
- Euzopherodes lutisignella (Mann, 1869)
- Euzopherodes vapidella (Mann, 1857)
- Faveria dionysia (Zeller, 1846)
- Fregenia prolai Hartig, 1947
- Galleria mellonella (Linnaeus, 1758)
- Glyptoteles leucacrinella Zeller, 1848
- Gymnancyla canella (Denis & Schiffermuller, 1775)
- Gymnancyla hornigii (Lederer, 1852)
- Homoeosoma inustella Ragonot, 1884
- Homoeosoma nebulella (Denis & Schiffermuller, 1775)
- Homoeosoma nimbella (Duponchel, 1837)
- Homoeosoma sinuella (Fabricius, 1794)
- Hypochalcia ahenella (Denis & Schiffermuller, 1775)
- Hypochalcia decorella (Hübner, 1810)
- Hypochalcia lignella (Hübner, 1796)
- Hypochalcia propinquella (Guenee, 1845)
- Hypotia corticalis (Denis & Schiffermuller, 1775)
- Hypotia infulalis Lederer, 1858
- Hypotia pectinalis (Herrich-Schäffer, 1838)
- Hypsopygia costalis (Fabricius, 1775)
- Hypsopygia fulvocilialis (Duponchel, 1834)
- Hypsopygia glaucinalis (Linnaeus, 1758)
- Hypsopygia incarnatalis (Zeller, 1847)
- Hypsopygia rubidalis (Denis & Schiffermuller, 1775)
- Hypsotropa limbella Zeller, 1848
- Hypsotropa vulneratella (Zeller, 1847)
- Isauria dilucidella (Duponchel, 1836)
- Khorassania compositella (Treitschke, 1835)
- Lamoria anella (Denis & Schiffermuller, 1775)
- Laodamia faecella (Zeller, 1839)
- Lepidogma tamaricalis (Mann, 1873)
- Loryma egregialis (Herrich-Schäffer, 1838)
- Maradana fuscolimbalis (Ragonot, 1888)
- Matilella fusca (Haworth, 1811)
- Megasis rippertella (Zeller, 1839)
- Merulempista cingillella (Zeller, 1846)
- Merulempista turturella (Zeller, 1848)
- Metallosticha argyrogrammos (Zeller, 1847)
- Metallostichodes nigrocyanella (Constant, 1865)
- Moitrelia italogallicella (Milliere, 1882)
- Moitrelia obductella (Zeller, 1839)
- Moitrelia thymiella (Zeller, 1846)
- Myelois circumvoluta (Fourcroy, 1785)
- Myelois cribratella Zeller, 1847
- Myelois multiflorella Ragonot, 1887
- Nephopterix angustella (Hübner, 1796)
- Neurotomia coenulentella (Zeller, 1846)
- Nyctegretis lineana (Scopoli, 1786)
- Nyctegretis ruminella La Harpe, 1860
- Nyctegretis triangulella Ragonot, 1901
- Oncocera semirubella (Scopoli, 1763)
- Ortholepis betulae (Goeze, 1778)
- Oxybia transversella (Duponchel, 1836)
- Paralipsa gularis (Zeller, 1877)
- Pempelia albariella Zeller, 1839
- Pempelia alpigenella (Duponchel, 1836)
- Pempelia brephiella (Staudinger, 1879)
- Pempelia genistella (Duponchel, 1836)
- Pempelia palumbella (Denis & Schiffermuller, 1775)
- Pempeliella matilella Leraut, 2001
- Pempeliella ornatella (Denis & Schiffermuller, 1775)
- Pempeliella sororiella Zeller, 1839
- Phycita meliella (Mann, 1864)
- Phycita metzneri (Zeller, 1846)
- Phycita nephodeella Ragonot, 1887
- Phycita poteriella (Zeller, 1846)
- Phycita roborella (Denis & Schiffermuller, 1775)
- Phycitodes albatella (Ragonot, 1887)
- Phycitodes binaevella (Hübner, 1813)
- Phycitodes inquinatella (Ragonot, 1887)
- Phycitodes lacteella (Rothschild, 1915)
- Phycitodes maritima (Tengstrom, 1848)
- Phycitodes saxicola (Vaughan, 1870)
- Pima boisduvaliella (Guenee, 1845)
- Plodia interpunctella (Hübner, 1813)
- Postemmalocera palaearctella (Turati, 1917)
- Psorosa dahliella (Treitschke, 1832)
- Psorosa lacteomarginata (A. Costa, 1888)
- Psorosa mediterranella Amsel, 1953
- Psorosa tergestella Ragonot, 1901
- Pterothrixidia rufella (Duponchel, 1836)
- Pyralestes ragusai Turati, 1922
- Pyralis farinalis (Linnaeus, 1758)
- Pyralis lienigialis (Zeller, 1843)
- Pyralis regalis Denis & Schiffermuller, 1775
- Raphimetopus ablutella (Zeller, 1839)
- Rhodophaea formosa (Haworth, 1811)
- Salebriopsis albicilla (Herrich-Schäffer, 1849)
- Saluria maculivittella Ragonot, 1887
- Sciota adelphella (Fischer v. Röslerstamm, 1836)
- Sciota fumella (Eversmann, 1844)
- Sciota hostilis (Stephens, 1834)
- Sciota rhenella (Zincken, 1818)
- Selagia argyrella (Denis & Schiffermuller, 1775)
- Selagia spadicella (Hübner, 1796)
- Seleucia pectinella (Chretien, 1911)
- Stemmatophora borgialis (Duponchel, 1832)
- Stemmatophora brunnealis (Treitschke, 1829)
- Stemmatophora combustalis (Fischer v. Röslerstamm, 1842)
- Synaphe antennalis (Fabricius, 1794)
- Synaphe bombycalis (Denis & Schiffermuller, 1775)
- Synaphe moldavica (Esper, 1794)
- Synaphe morbidalis (Guenee, 1849)
- Synaphe punctalis (Fabricius, 1775)
- Trachonitis cristella (Denis & Schiffermuller, 1775)
- Valdovecaria umbratella (Treitschke, 1832)
- Vitula biviella (Zeller, 1848)
- Zophodia grossulariella (Hübner, 1809)

== See also ==
- List of butterflies of Italy
