= Cremnophila =

Cremnophila may refer to:

- Cremnophila (moth), a genus of moths in the family Pyralidae
- Cremnophila (plant), a genus of plants in the family Crassulaceae
