= Cremnophila pyraustella =

Scientific classification
- Domain: Eukaryota
- Kingdom: Animalia
- Phylum: Arthropoda
- Class: Insecta
- Order: Lepidoptera
- Family: Pyralidae
- Genus: Cremnophila
- Species: C. pyraustella

Binomial name
- Cremnophila pyraustella Zerny, 1914

Species of moth

Cremnophila pyraustella is a species of snout moth in the genus Cremnophila. It was described by Zerny in 1914, and is known from China.
