= Ectoedemia contorta =

Scientific classification
- Kingdom: Animalia
- Phylum: Arthropoda
- Clade: Pancrustacea
- Class: Insecta
- Order: Lepidoptera
- Family: Nepticulidae
- Genus: Ectoedemia
- Species: E. contorta

Binomial name
- Ectoedemia contorta van Nieukerken, 1985

Species of moth

Ectoedemia contorta is a moth of the family Nepticulidae. It is found from the Czech Republic and Slovakia to Spain, Italy and Greece.

The wingspan is 4.6-5.6 mm. Adults are on wing in autumn. There is one generation per year.

The larvae feed on Quercus pubescens. They mine the leaves of their host plant. The mine resembles that of Ectoedemia albifasciella.
