= Stigmella szoecsiella =

Scientific classification
- Kingdom: Animalia
- Phylum: Arthropoda
- Clade: Pancrustacea
- Class: Insecta
- Order: Lepidoptera
- Family: Nepticulidae
- Genus: Stigmella
- Species: S. szoecsiella

Binomial name
- Stigmella szoecsiella (Borkowski, 1972)

Synonyms
- Nepticula szoecsiella Borkowski, 1972

Species of moth

Stigmella szoecsiella is a moth of the family Nepticulidae. It is found in Hungary, Italy, Greece and Turkey.

The wingspan is 4.7-5.2 mm. Adults are on wing from June to August.

The larvae feed on Quercus cerris and Quercus trojana. They mine the leaves of their host plant.
