= Stigmella irregularis =

Scientific classification
- Kingdom: Animalia
- Phylum: Arthropoda
- Class: Insecta
- Order: Lepidoptera
- Family: Nepticulidae
- Genus: Stigmella
- Species: S. irregularis

Binomial name
- Stigmella irregularis Puplesis, 1994

Species of moth

Stigmella irregularis is a moth of the family Nepticulidae. It has been recorded from Crete, Greece, Italy and Ukraine.
