= Stigmella splendidissimella =

Scientific classification
- Kingdom: Animalia
- Phylum: Arthropoda
- Class: Insecta
- Order: Lepidoptera
- Family: Nepticulidae
- Genus: Stigmella
- Species: S. splendidissimella

Binomial name
- Stigmella splendidissimella (Herrich-Schäffer, 1855)

Synonyms
- Nepticula splendidissimella Herrich-Schaffer, 1855; Nepticula dulcella Heinemann, 1862; Nepticula fragarivora Carolsfeld-Krause, 1944; Nepticula inaequalis Heinemann, 1862; Nepticula splendidissima Frey, 1856; Stigmella dulcella

Species of moth

Stigmella splendidissimella is a moth of the family Nepticulidae. It is found from Scandinavia to Italy and from Ireland to the Crimea. It is not found in the Iberian Peninsula and the Balkan Peninsula.

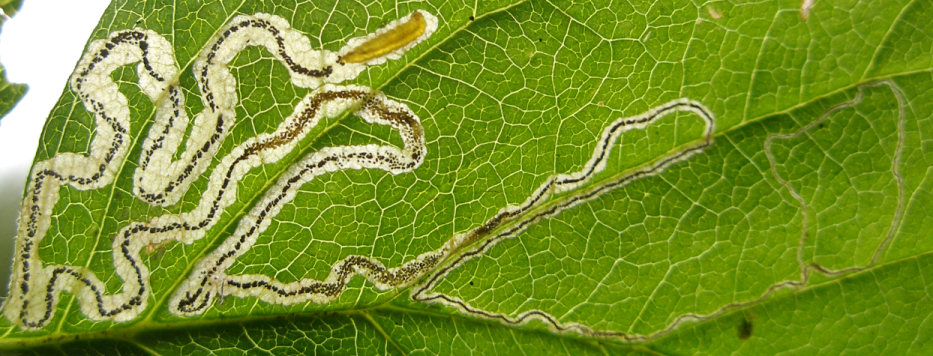
Stigmella splendidissimella mine

The wingspan is 4–6 millimetres (0.16–0.24 in). The thick erect hairs on the head vertex are black. The collar is black. The antennal eyecaps are white. The forewings are dark coppery-purple-brown with a suffused brassy or green basal patch; a straight shining pale golden or shiny silver fascia beyond middle. The hindwings are grey. External image

The larvae feed on Agrimonia, Fragaria, Filipendula, Geum urbanum, Potentilla anserina, Rubus caesius, Rubus fruticosus and Rubus idaeus. They mine the leaves of their host plant.
