= Cremnophila (moth) =

Scientific classification
- Domain: Eukaryota
- Kingdom: Animalia
- Phylum: Arthropoda
- Class: Insecta
- Order: Lepidoptera
- Family: Pyralidae
- Tribe: Phycitini
- Genus: Cremnophila; Ragonot, 1893

Genus of moths

Cremnophila is a genus of snout moths. It was erected by Ragonot in 1893, and is known from Russia, Siberia, China, Austria, and Switzerland.

== Species ==
- Cremnophila pyraustella Zerny, 1914
- Cremnophila sedakovella (Eversmann, 1851)
