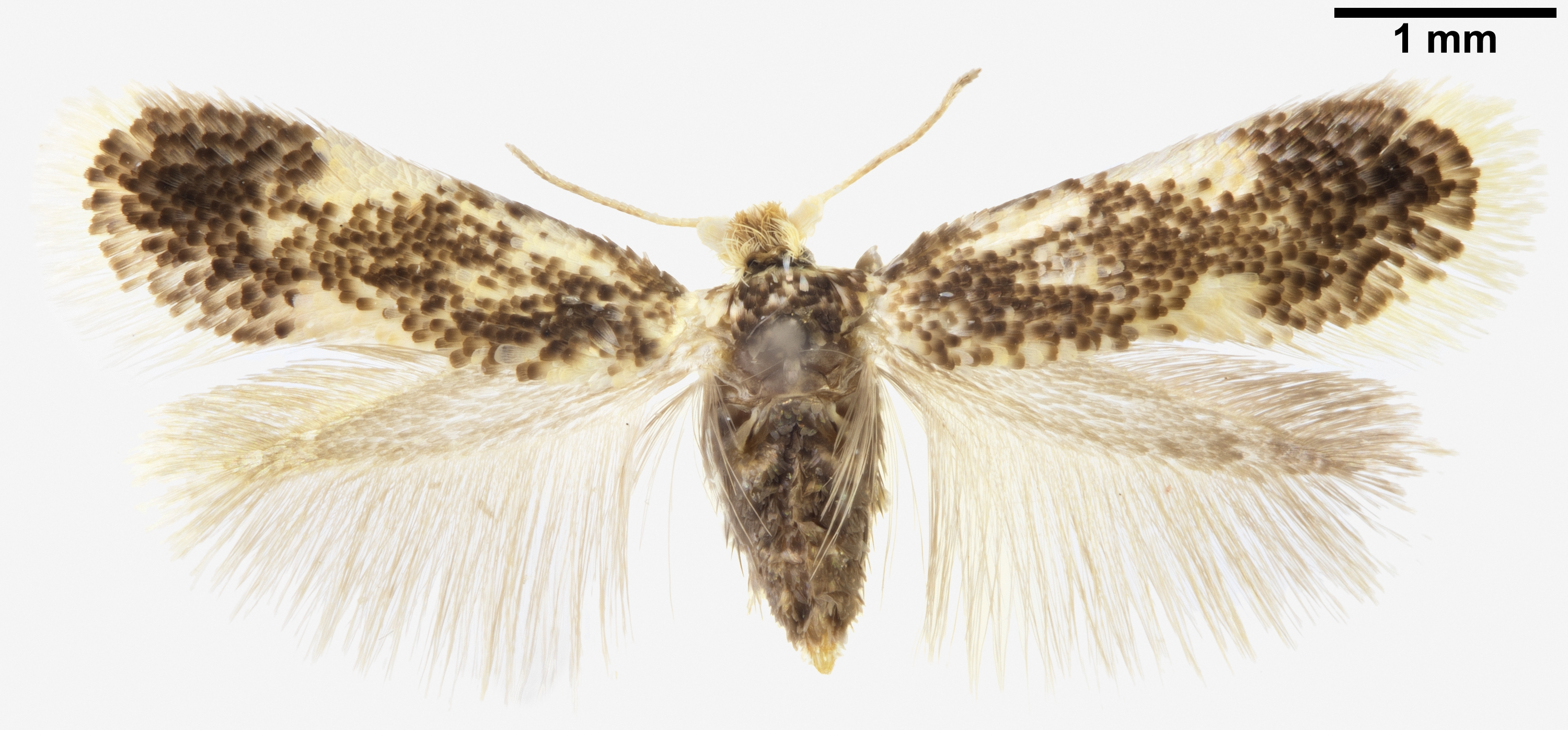

Scientific classification
- Kingdom: Animalia
- Phylum: Arthropoda
- Clade: Pancrustacea
- Class: Insecta
- Order: Lepidoptera
- Family: Nepticulidae
- Genus: Ectoedemia
- Species: E. turbidella

Binomial name
- Ectoedemia turbidella (Zeller, 1848)

Synonyms
- Nepticula turbidella Zeller, 1848; Nepticula argyropezella Herrich-Schaffer, 1855; Nepticula populialbae Hering, 1935; Stigmella marionella Ford, 1950

= Ectoedemia turbidella =

Species of moth

Ectoedemia turbidella is a moth of the family Nepticulidae and is found in most of Europe. The larva mine the leaves of poplar trees and was first described by the German entomologist Philipp Christoph Zeller in 1848.

== Description ==
The wingspan is 6–7 mm. The wing ground colour is grey. There are creamy white forewing patches and the head has an orange or yellowish tuft and whitish eyecaps. Adults are on wing from May to June.

== Distribution ==
It is found in most of Europe (except Ireland, Greece and the Mediterranean islands), east to the Volga and Ural regions of Russia.

== Gallery ==
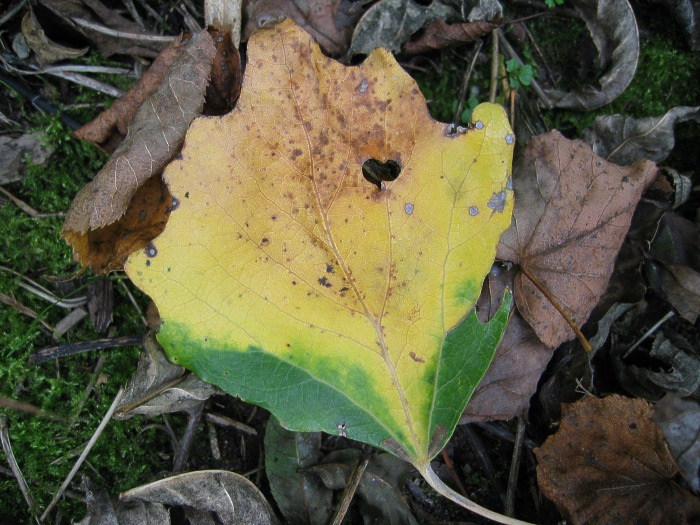
Larval feeding signs

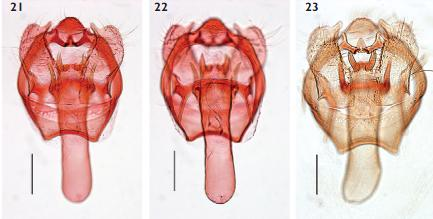
Male genitalia

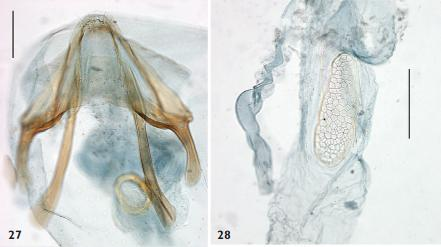
Female genitalia
