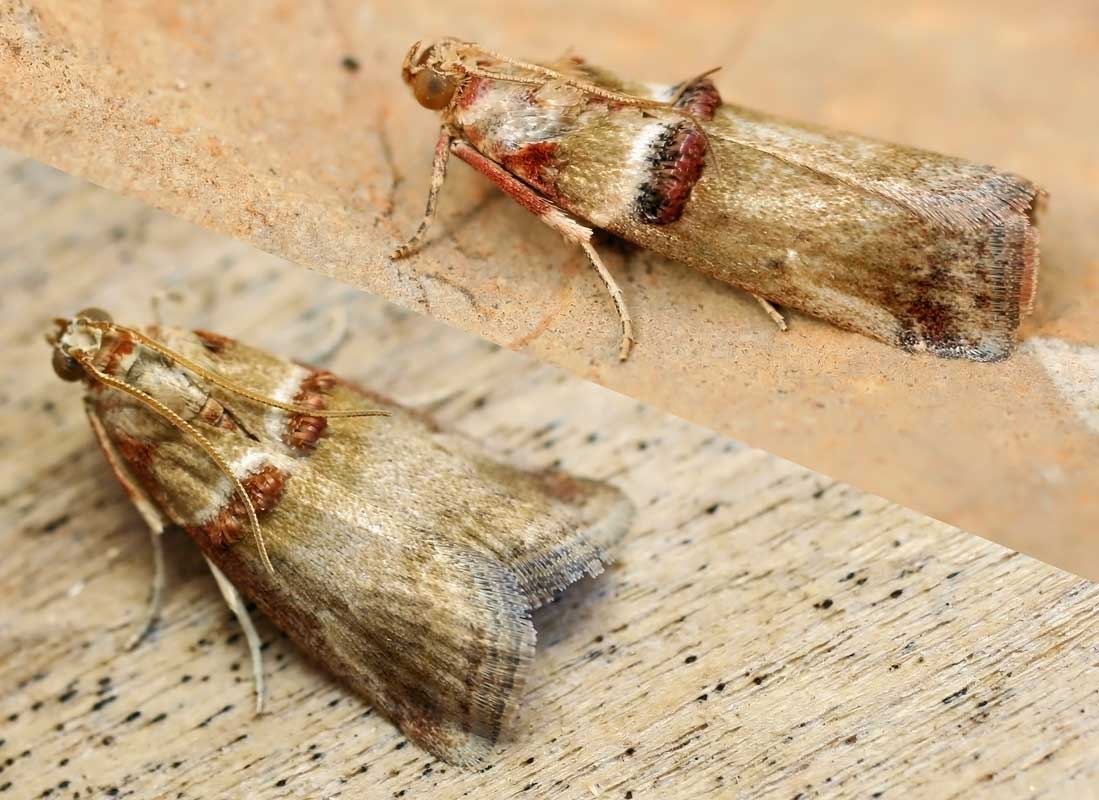

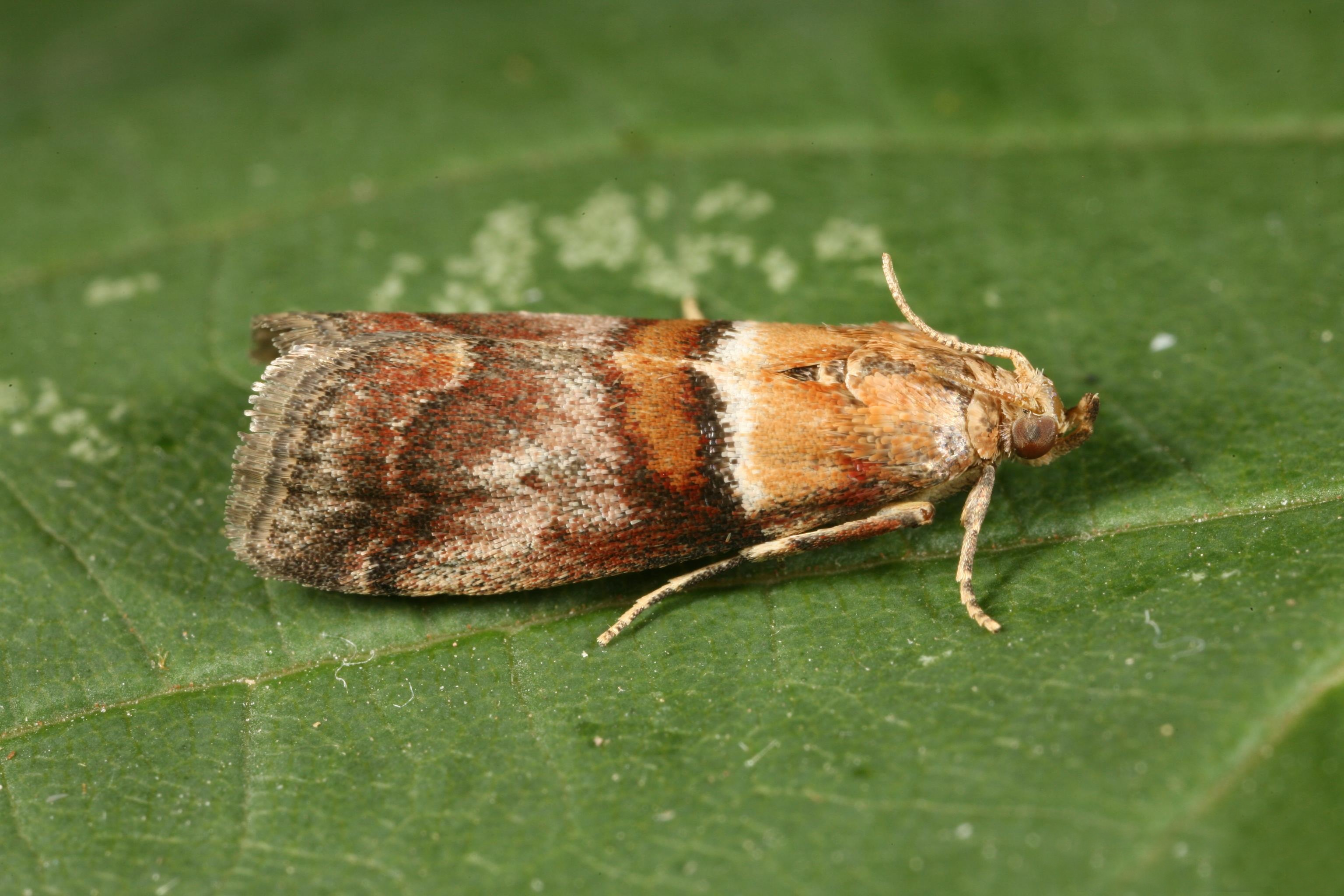

Scientific classification
- Kingdom: Animalia
- Phylum: Arthropoda
- Clade: Pancrustacea
- Class: Insecta
- Order: Lepidoptera
- Family: Pyralidae
- Genus: Acrobasis
- Species: A. tumidana

Binomial name
- Acrobasis tumidana (Denis & Schiffermuller, 1775)

Synonyms
- Tortrix tumidana Denis & Schiffermuller, 1775; Conobathra tumidana gilva Roesler, 1987; Phycis rubrotibiella Mann in Fischer von Röslerstamm, 1839; Phycis verrucea Haworth, 1811; Conobathra tumidana sarda Roesler, 1987; Tinea verrucella Hübner, 1796; Zophodia tumidalis Hübner, 1825

= Acrobasis tumidana =

Species of moth

Acrobasis tumidana is a moth of the family Pyralidae. It was described in 1775 by Michael Denis and Ignaz Schiffermüller and is found in Europe.

The wingspan is 19–24 mm. The moth flies in one generation from July to August..

The larvae feed on oak.

== Notes ==
1. The flight season refers to Belgium and the Netherlands. This may vary in other parts of the range.
