= Hellinsia inulaevorus =

Scientific classification
- Domain: Eukaryota
- Kingdom: Animalia
- Phylum: Arthropoda
- Class: Insecta
- Order: Lepidoptera
- Family: Pterophoridae
- Genus: Hellinsia
- Species: H. inulaevorus

Binomial name
- Hellinsia inulaevorus (Gibeaux, 1989

Synonyms
- Leioptilus inulaevorus Gibeaux, 1989

Species of plume moth

Hellinsia inulaevorus is a moth of the family Pterophoridae that can be found in France and Italy.
