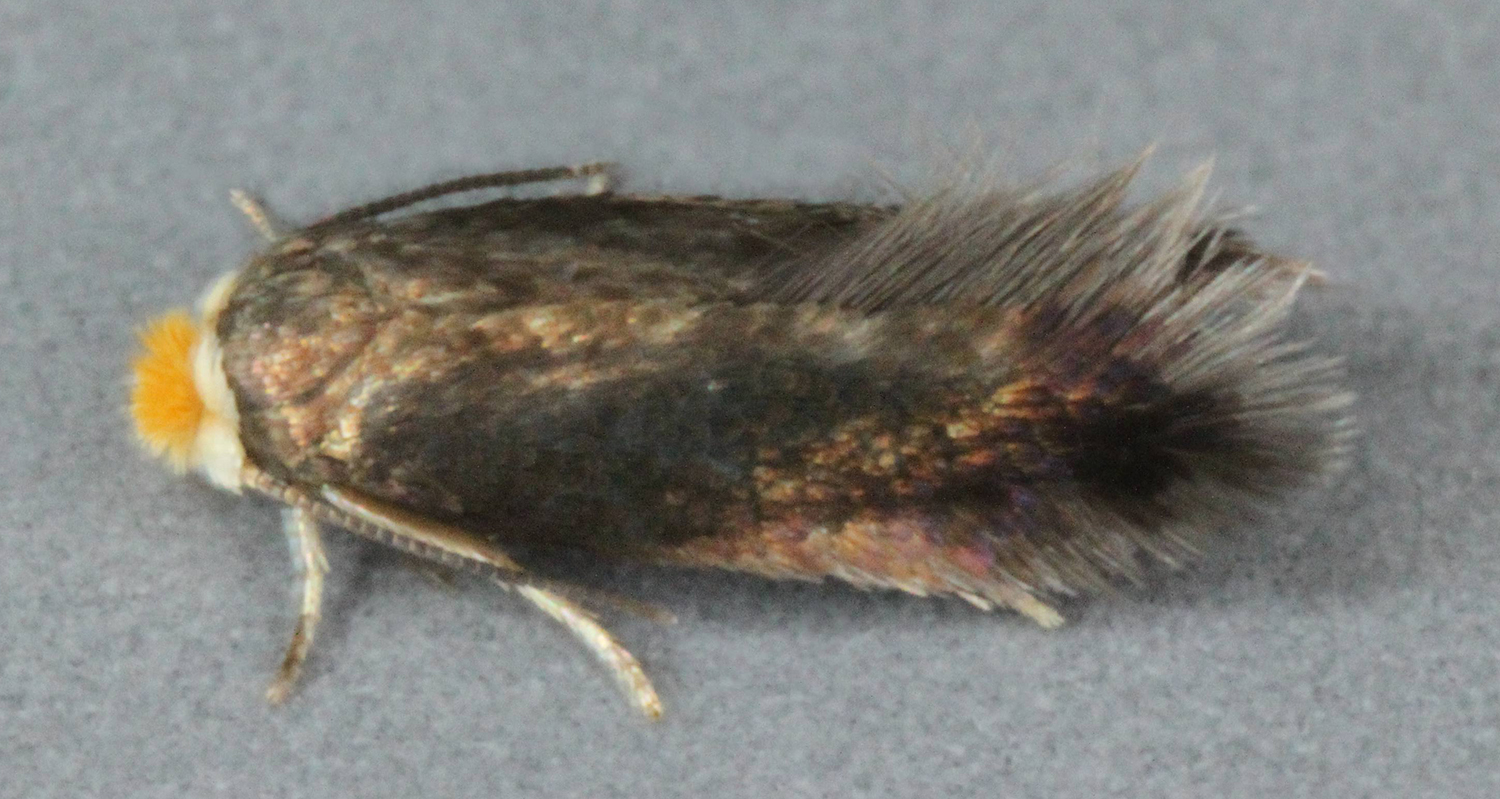

Scientific classification
- Kingdom: Animalia
- Phylum: Arthropoda
- Clade: Pancrustacea
- Class: Insecta
- Order: Lepidoptera
- Family: Nepticulidae
- Genus: Stigmella
- Species: S. ruficapitella

Binomial name
- Stigmella ruficapitella (Haworth, 1828)

Synonyms
- Nepticula ruficapitella (Haworth, 1828); Tinea ruficapitella Haworth, 1828

= Stigmella ruficapitella =

Species of moth

Stigmella ruficapitella is a moth of the family Nepticulidae. It is found in northern and central Europe. It is mostly absent in the Mediterranean region, with the exception of Mount Olympus in Greece and Trieste. It has recently been recorded from Russia and Bosnia.

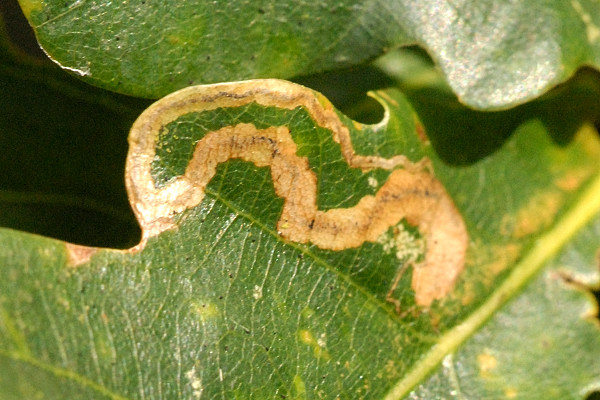
Stigmella ruficapitella mine

The wingspan is 4.5–6 mm. The thick erect hairs on the head vertex are black in the male, orange yellow in the female and the collar is black in both sexes. The antennal eyecaps are yellow- white. The front wings are dark bronze brown with a weak metallic luster. The hindwings are grey.

Adults are on wing from May to June and from July to August. There are two generations per year.

The larvae feed on Quercus cerris, Quercus petraea, Quercus pubescens and Quercus robur. They mine the leaves of their host plant.
