= Cremnophila sedakovella =

Scientific classification
- Domain: Eukaryota
- Kingdom: Animalia
- Phylum: Arthropoda
- Class: Insecta
- Order: Lepidoptera
- Family: Pyralidae
- Genus: Cremnophila
- Species: C. sedakovella

Binomial name
- Cremnophila sedakovella (Eversmann, 1851)

Synonyms
- Myelophila sedakovella Eversmann, 1851; Homoeosoma flaviciliella Herrich-Schäffer, 1855; Cremnophila auranticiliella Ragonot, 1893

Species of moth

Cremnophila sedakovella is a species of snout moth in the genus Cremnophila. It was described by Eduard Friedrich Eversmann in 1851 and is known from Russia, Austria, Switzerland, Italy and Spain.

== Subspecies ==
- Cremnophila sedakovella sedakovella
- Cremnophila sedakovella auranticiliella Ragonot, 1892 (Siberia)
