= Stigmella alaternella =

Scientific classification
- Kingdom: Animalia
- Phylum: Arthropoda
- Class: Insecta
- Order: Lepidoptera
- Family: Nepticulidae
- Genus: Stigmella
- Species: S. alaternella

Binomial name
- Stigmella alaternella (Le Marchand, 1937)

Species of moth

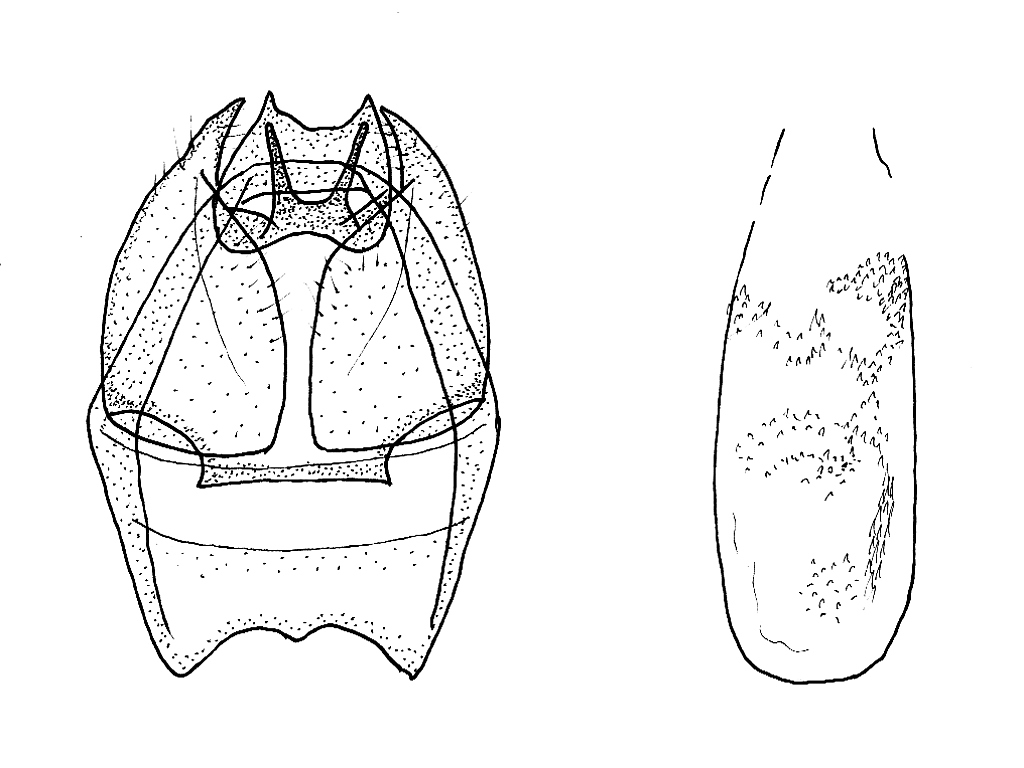
Stigmella alaternella, male genitalia

Stigmella alaternella is a moth of the family Nepticulidae. It is found in France, the Iberian Peninsula and Italy.
