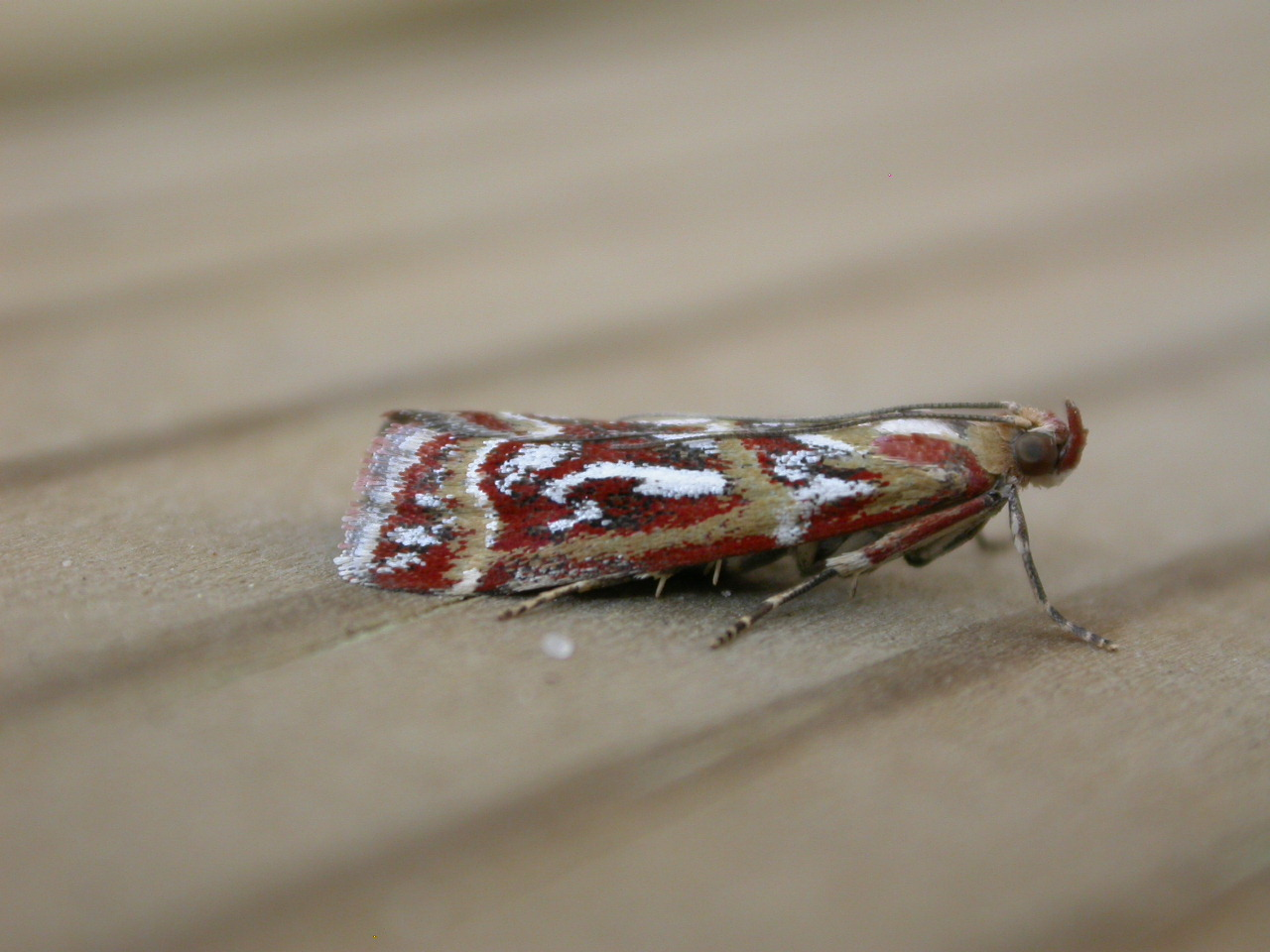

Scientific classification
- Kingdom: Animalia
- Phylum: Arthropoda
- Clade: Pancrustacea
- Class: Insecta
- Order: Lepidoptera
- Family: Pyralidae
- Genus: Acrobasis
- Species: A. porphyrella

Binomial name
- Acrobasis porphyrella (Duponchel, 1836)

Synonyms
- Phycis porphyrella Duponchel, 1836

= Acrobasis porphyrella =

Species of moth

Acrobasis porphyrella is a moth of the family Pyralidae. It is known from Spain, Portugal, France, Corsica, Sardinia, the Balearic Islands, Italy and Croatia.

The larvae feed on Erica arborea and Erica scoparia.
