= Acrobasis centunculella =

Scientific classification
- Kingdom: Animalia
- Phylum: Arthropoda
- Clade: Pancrustacea
- Class: Insecta
- Order: Lepidoptera
- Family: Pyralidae
- Genus: Acrobasis
- Species: A. centunculella

Binomial name
- Acrobasis centunculella (J. J. Mann, 1859)

Synonyms
- Myelois centunculella J. J. Mann, 1859

Species of moth

Acrobasis centunculella is a species of snout moth in the genus Acrobasis. It was described by Josef Johann Mann in 1859. It is found in southern Europe.
