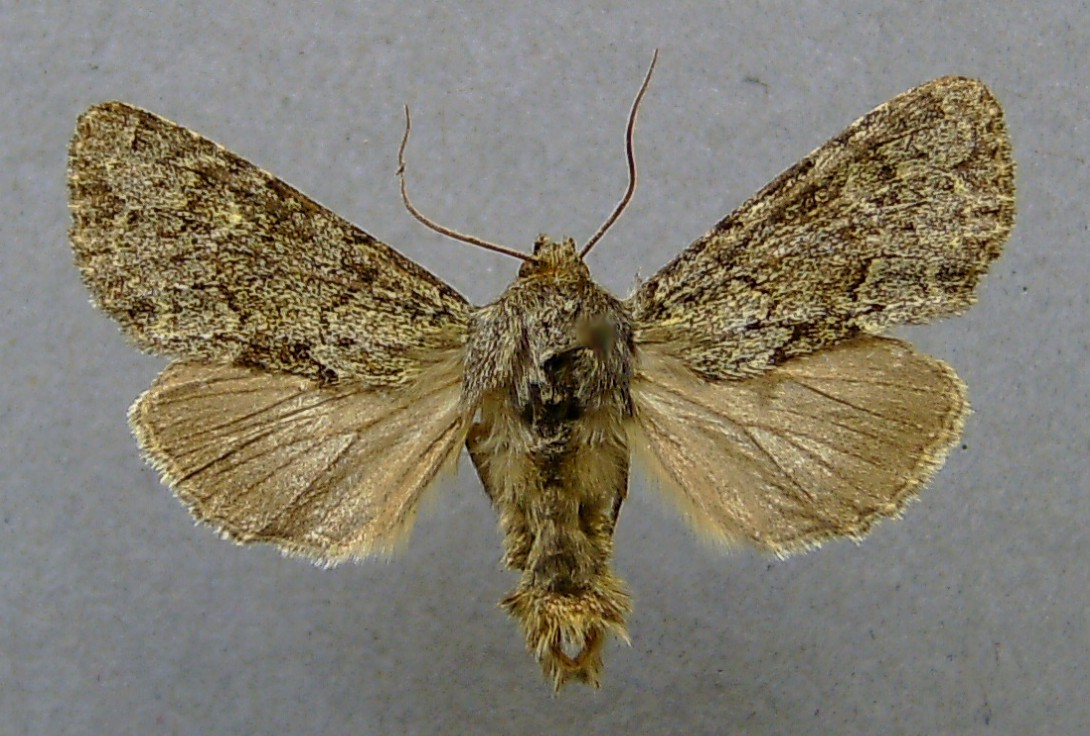

Scientific classification
- Domain: Eukaryota
- Kingdom: Animalia
- Phylum: Arthropoda
- Class: Insecta
- Order: Lepidoptera
- Superfamily: Noctuoidea
- Family: Noctuidae
- Genus: Apamea
- Species: A. zeta

Binomial name
- Apamea zeta (Treitschke, 1825)

Synonyms
- Abromias exulis (Lefebvre, 1836); Abromias zeta (Treitschke, 1825); Apamea borea Herrich-Schäffer, 1852; Apamea exulis (Lefebvre, 1836); Apamea maillardi (Geyer); Apamea murrayi (Gibson, 1920); Apamea nichollae (Hampson, 1908); Apamea zeta carptodistincta Rakosy, Stangelmaier & Wieser, 1996; Apamea zeta cyanochlora Varga, 1976; Apamea zeta pseudopernix Varga, 1977; Apamea zeta sandorkovacsi Peregovits & Varga, 1984; Crymodes borea Guenée, 1852; Crymodes exulis (Lefebvre, 1836); Crymodes zeta rofana Wolfberger, 1952; Exarnis difflua Geyer, 1837; Hadena exulis Lefebvre, 1836; Hadena gelata Lefebvre, 1836; Hadena zeta var. curoi Calberla, 1888; Noctua pernix Geyer, 1832; Polia clandestina Boisduval, 1928; Polia zeta Treitschke, 1825

= Apamea zeta =

Species of moth

Apamea zeta is a moth of the family Noctuidae. It has a Holarctic distribution, and can be found throughout the Northern Hemisphere. It occurs throughout Europe and the northern half of North America.

== Technical description and variation ==
C. zeta Tr. (41 e). Forewing dull grey green overlaid with hoary grey scales; inner and outer lines black, conversely edged with hoary grey and lunulate-dentate; the outer line sinuate, not indented below middle; stigmata grey edged with black, the two upper separated by the well marked blackish median shade; submarginal line pale, often broken up, indented on the folds, preceded by black wedge-shapedmarks; hindwing fuscous, paler towards base; the whole forewing has a mealy appearance, and in paler examples the markings are often much obscured; — ab. pernix Hbn.-C. (= clandestina Bsd.) (41 e), is the darkest form, with the markings plainest; — curoi Calb. (41 e), from Italy, is chalk grey, glossy, more like a very pale examples of platinea, with the lines and outlines of stigmata finely blackish grey, the median shade and submarginal line slightly marked in grey, the orbicular absent, and the reniform smaller; the head, thorax, and abdomen are as pale as the forewings and all without grey dusting; the hindwing pale dirty grey with dark cellspot and veins, and black marginal lunules; — ab. zetina Stgr., [now full species Haderonia zetina (Staudinger, 1900)] from the Thian-Shan Mts., is described as smaller: the forewings greenish grey, with the markings distinct; a form with the whole forewing uniform grey without markings except the pale reniform, as far as subterminal line, which is conspicuously pale preceded by a dark shade, and with the terminal area beyond quite pale, from Silvaplana, in the Engadine, Switzerland, may be distinguished as ab. marginata ab. nov. (41 e); in transversata ab.nov. (41 e) the forewing shows the median shade crossing it as a strong blackish band; — in rivalis Guen. (? Friv.) (41 e), the forewing is much varied with yellow scales, the locality given being Mountains near the Sea of Marmora. The wingspan is 43–50 mm.

== Biology ==
Adults are on wing from July to August in Britain.

The larvae are cutworms that feed on various grasses. In North America the cutworm can be found on fescues in alpine tundra habitat.

== Subspecies ==
- Apamea zeta assimilis – Northern Arches
- Apamea zeta cyanochlora (Bulgaria)
- Apamea zeta downesi Mikkola, 2009 (North America)
- Apamea zeta hellernica (Greece)
- Apamea zeta marmorata – The Exile
- Apamea zeta murrayi (Gibson, 1920) (North America)
- Apamea zeta nichollae Hampson, 1908 (North America)
- Apamea zeta pelagica Mikkola, 2009 (North America)
- Apamea zeta sanderkovacsi (Romania)
- Apamea zeta zeta (most of Europe)

Former subspecies Apamea zeta alticola is now considered a valid species, Apamea alticola (Smith, 1891).
