= Phycita metzneri =

Scientific classification
- Kingdom: Animalia
- Phylum: Arthropoda
- Clade: Pancrustacea
- Class: Insecta
- Order: Lepidoptera
- Family: Pyralidae
- Genus: Phycita
- Species: P. metzneri

Binomial name
- Phycita metzneri (Zeller, 1846)

Synonyms
- Nephopterix metzneri Zeller, 1846

Species of moth

Phycita metzneri is a species of snout moth. It is found in France, Italy, Croatia, Hungary, Romania, Bulgaria, North Macedonia, Greece and Turkey.
