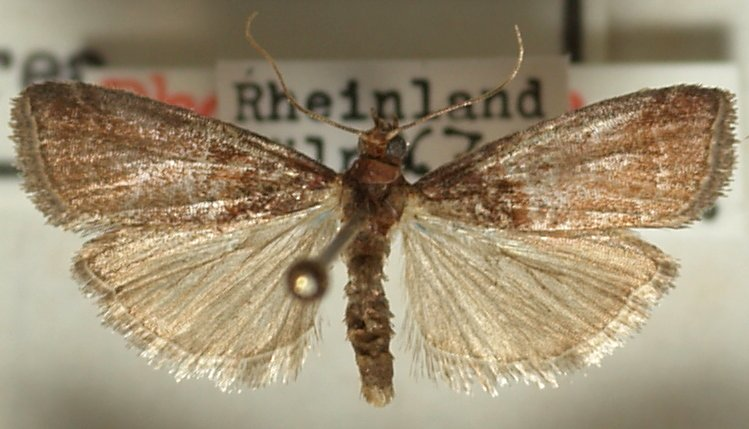

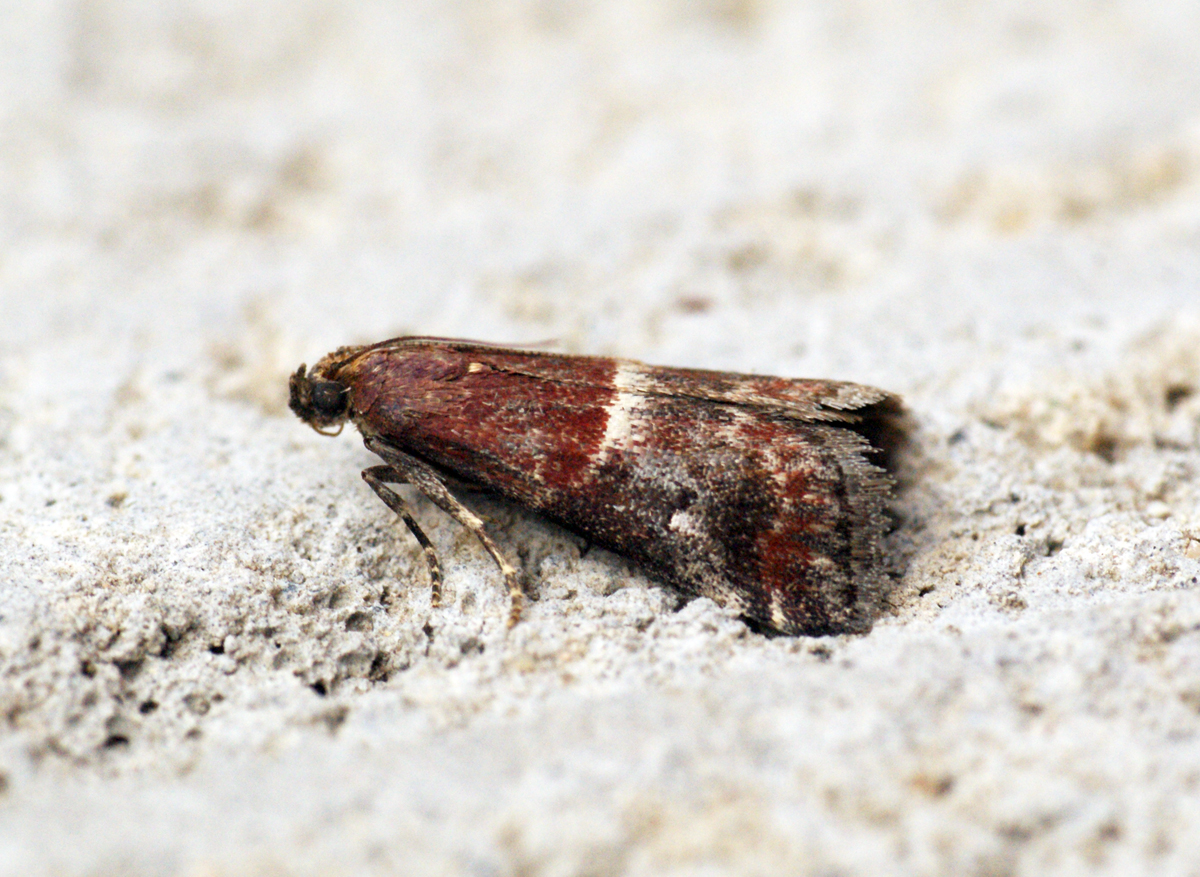

Scientific classification
- Kingdom: Animalia
- Phylum: Arthropoda
- Clade: Pancrustacea
- Class: Insecta
- Order: Lepidoptera
- Family: Pyralidae
- Genus: Acrobasis
- Species: A. marmorea

Binomial name
- Acrobasis marmorea (Haworth, 1811)

Synonyms
- Phycis marmorea Haworth, 1811; Trachycera marmorea; Myelois marmorea lugens Staudinger, 1881; Myelois epelydella Zeller, 1839

= Acrobasis marmorea =

Species of moth

Acrobasis marmorea is a moth of the family Pyralidae. It is found in Europe.

The wingspan is 18–23 mm. The moth flies in one generation from June to August..

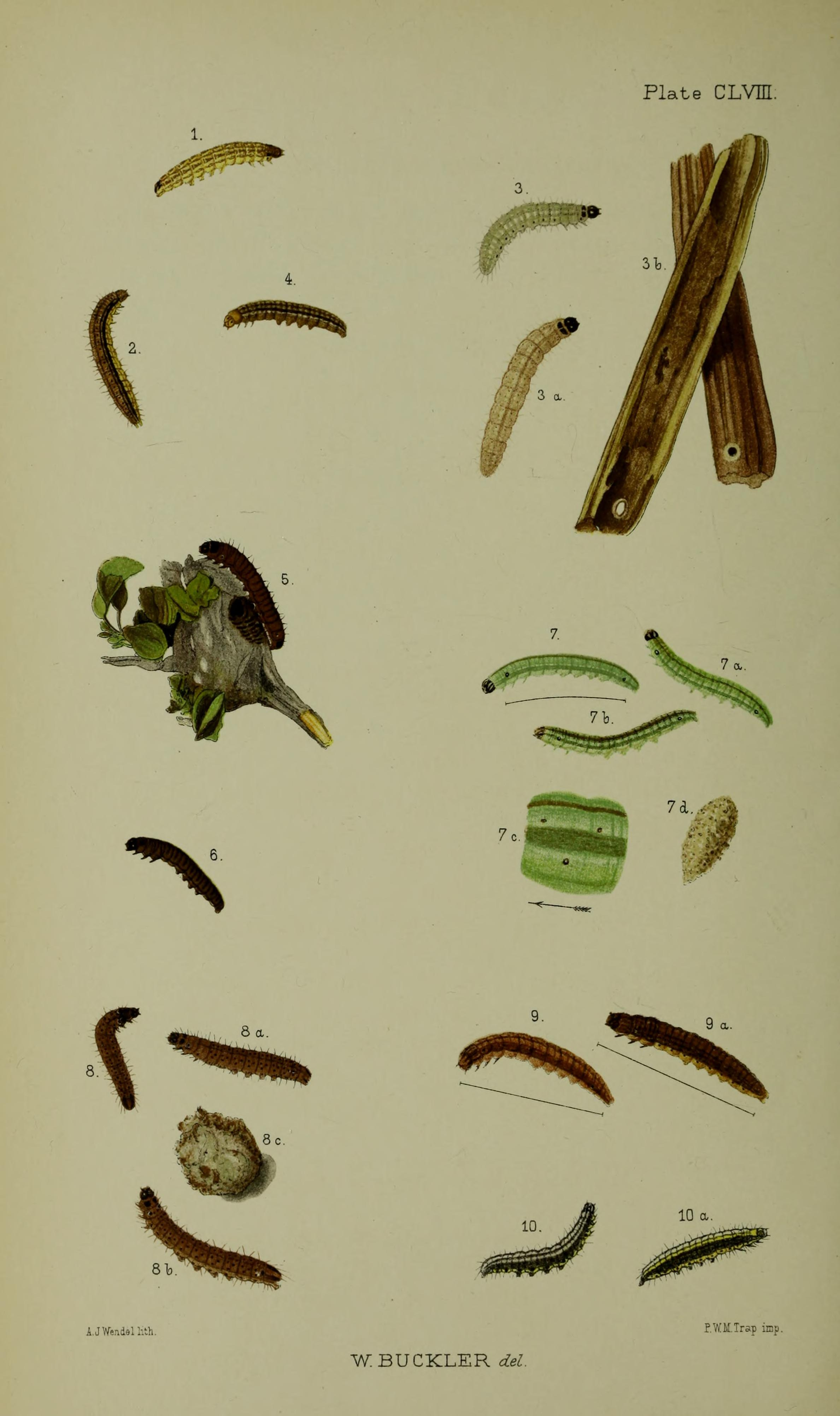
Fig. 6 larva after final moult

The caterpillars feed on hawthorn and blackthorn.

== Notes ==
The flight season refers to Belgium and the Netherlands. This may vary in other parts of the range.
