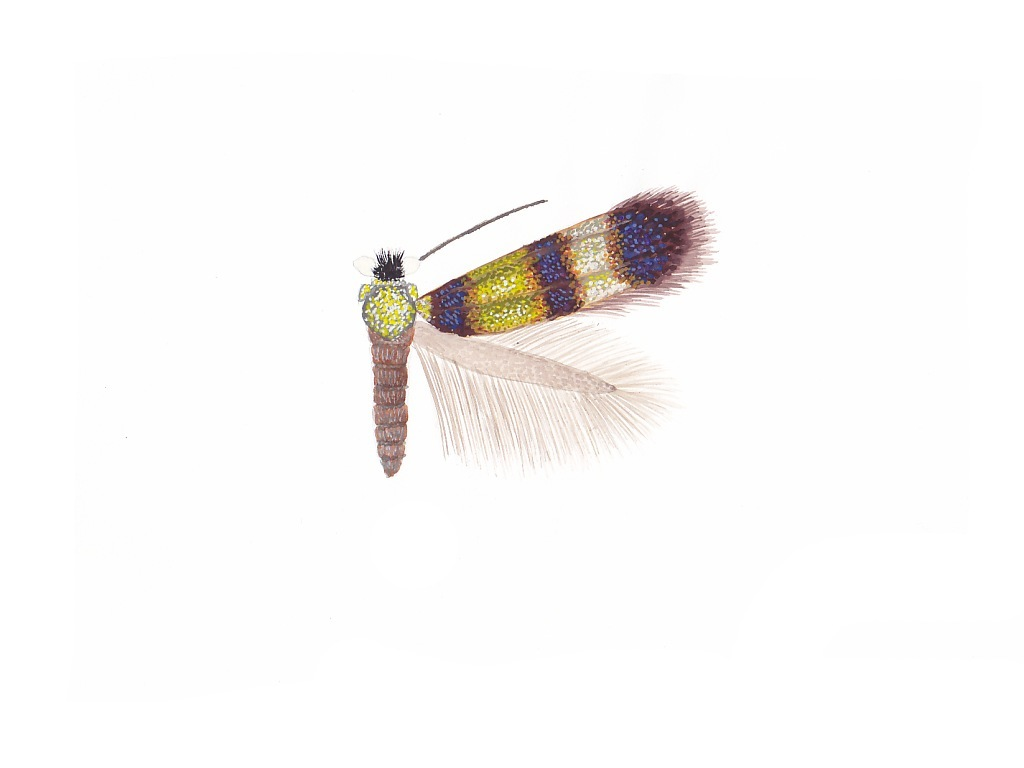

Scientific classification
- Kingdom: Animalia
- Phylum: Arthropoda
- Class: Insecta
- Order: Lepidoptera
- Family: Nepticulidae
- Genus: Stigmella
- Species: S. aeneofasciella

Binomial name
- Stigmella aeneofasciella (Herrich-Schaffer, 1855)

Synonyms
- Nepticula aeneofasciella Herrich-Schaffer, 1855; Nepticula aeneofasciata Frey, 1856

= Stigmella aeneofasciella =

Species of moth

Stigmella aeneofasciella is a moth of the family Nepticulidae. It is found in most of Europe, except the Iberian Peninsula and Balkan Peninsula and the Mediterranean islands.

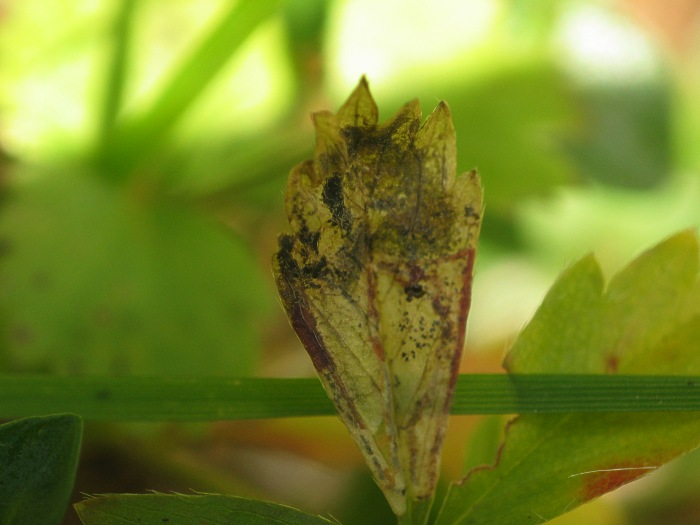
Damage

The wingspan is 4.4-5.5 mm. The head is black; the antennal eyecaps white. The forewings are shining brass with a deep purple basal fascia and a shining silvery fascia beyond middle, preceded by a purple fascia; apical area beyond this deep purple. The hindwings are grey.

Adults are on wing from April to May and again from July to August. There are two generations per year.

The larvae feed on Agrimonia eupatoria, Fragaria vesca, Potentilla anserina, Potentilla erecta and Potentilla reptans. They mine the leaves of their host plant.
