= Stigmella catharticella =

Scientific classification
- Kingdom: Animalia
- Phylum: Arthropoda
- Clade: Pancrustacea
- Class: Insecta
- Order: Lepidoptera
- Family: Nepticulidae
- Genus: Stigmella
- Species: S. catharticella

Binomial name
- Stigmella catharticella (Stainton, 1853)

Synonyms
- Nepticula catharticella Stainton, 1853

Species of moth

Stigmella catharticella is a moth of the family Nepticulidae. It is found in from Fennoscandia to the Pyrenees, Italy and Bulgaria, and from Ireland to Russia.

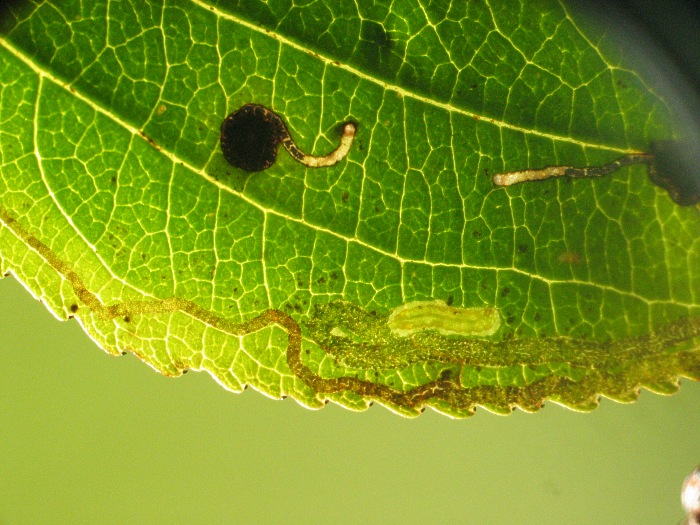
Damage

The wingspan is 5–6 mm (0.20–0.24 in). The antennae are filamentous, dark and almost as long as the forewing. The innermost, greatly expanded joint is white. The head is yellow-haired, the body dark, but with two white patches of hair on the "neck". The forewings are grey, covered with strikingly coarse scales that have darker tips so that the wing appears slightly speckled. They are a white spot at the trailing edge just inside the back corner. The hind wing is narrow, grey, with long fringes. Meyrick - The head is ferruginous-orange, the collar whitish. The antennal eyecaps are whitish. The posterior tarsi are whitish, spotted with dark fuscous. The forewings are dark fuscous, faintly purple -tinged with a roundish white tornal spot; outer half of cilia white. The hindwings are grey.

Adults are on wing from May to June and again from July to September.

The larvae feed on Rhamnus catharticus and is found where this shrub grows, for example by salt meadows.. They mine the leaves of their host plant, the mine forming hairpin turns in the leaf. Often there is more than one caterpillar in one leaf.. The species has two generations each year, the adult moths fly in May–June and July–August, respectively.
