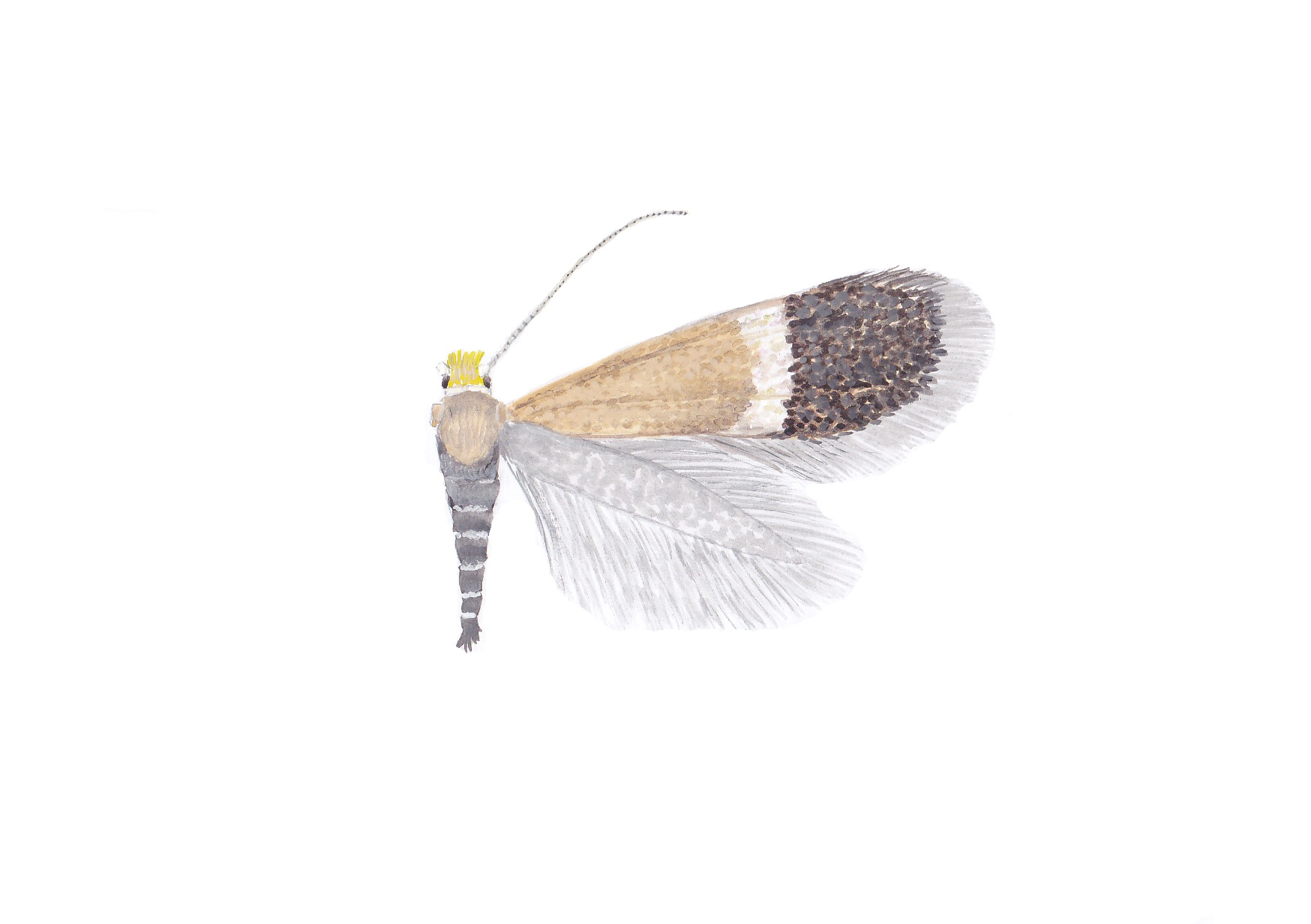

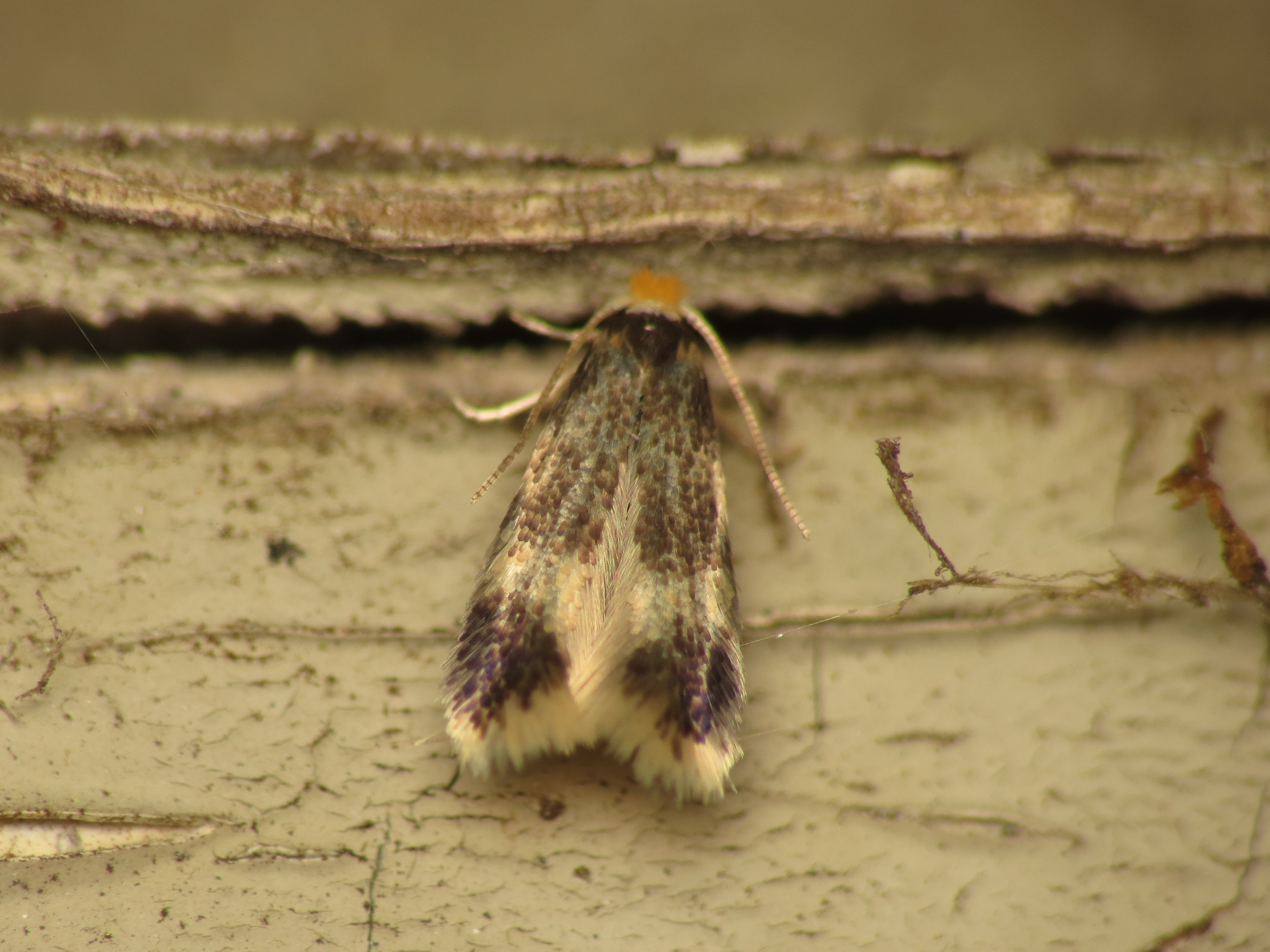

Scientific classification
- Kingdom: Animalia
- Phylum: Arthropoda
- Clade: Pancrustacea
- Class: Insecta
- Order: Lepidoptera
- Family: Nepticulidae
- Genus: Stigmella
- Species: S. floslactella

Binomial name
- Stigmella floslactella (Haworth, 1828)

Synonyms
- Tinea floslactella Haworth, 1828; Nepticula saxatilella Gronlien, 1932

= Stigmella floslactella =

Species of moth

Stigmella floslactella is a moth of the family Nepticulidae. It is found in all of Europe, except the Balkan Peninsula and the Mediterranean islands.

== Description ==
The wingspan is 5–6 millimetres (0.20–0.24 in). Unlike many other Stigmella, this species is quite variable in the colour of its wings. The antennae are filamentous, yellowish-brown and about half as long as the forewing. The innermost, greatly expanded joint is white, the head is covered with yellow hairs. The forebody can vary in colour from yellowish-brown to brownish-black, the hind body is dark. The forewings are relatively brightly coloured, with conspicuously large scales. They can be uniformly brownish, yellow with a dark tip or yellowish-brown with a broad, slightly curved, light transverse band, in which case the tip is usually darker. If the basic colour is light, there are usually scattered, darker scales there as well. The hind wing is narrow, grey, with long fringes. The species is usually fairly easy to recognize by the light wing colour, most other dwarf Stigmella are much darker.

Adults are on wing in May and again in August. There are two generations per year.

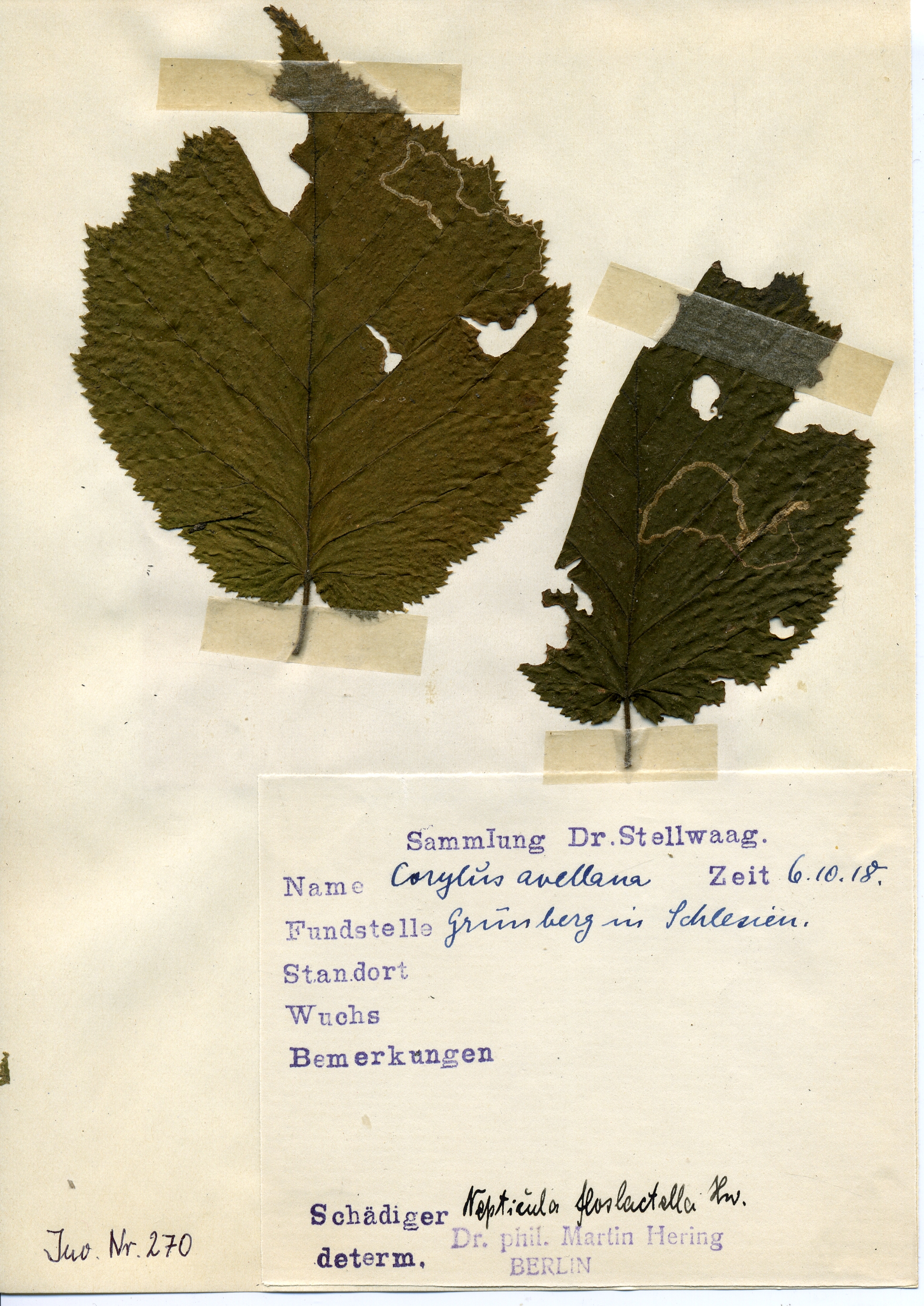
Stigmella-floslactella mines

== Occurrences and ecology ==
Stigmella floslactella occurs in Ireland where it is known to feed on various hornbeam and hazel species, including Corylus avellana. It is considered to be an uncommon visitor to Belgium and the Netherlands, where it feed on Carpinus betulus and Corylus avellana.

== Ecology ==
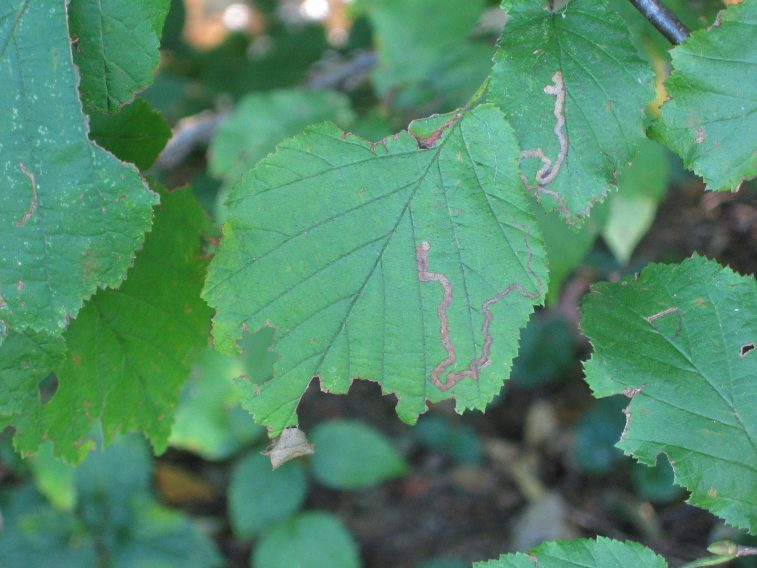
Mine

The larvae feed on hornbeam (Carpinus betulus), hazel (Corylus avellana), filbert (Corylus maxima) and European hop-hornbeam (Ostrya carpinifolia). They mine the leaves of their host plant which consists of a slender, gradually widening corridor. The last section is considerably wider than the larva. The trajectory of the mine is not angular and is independent of the leaf venation. Pupation takes place outside of the mine.
