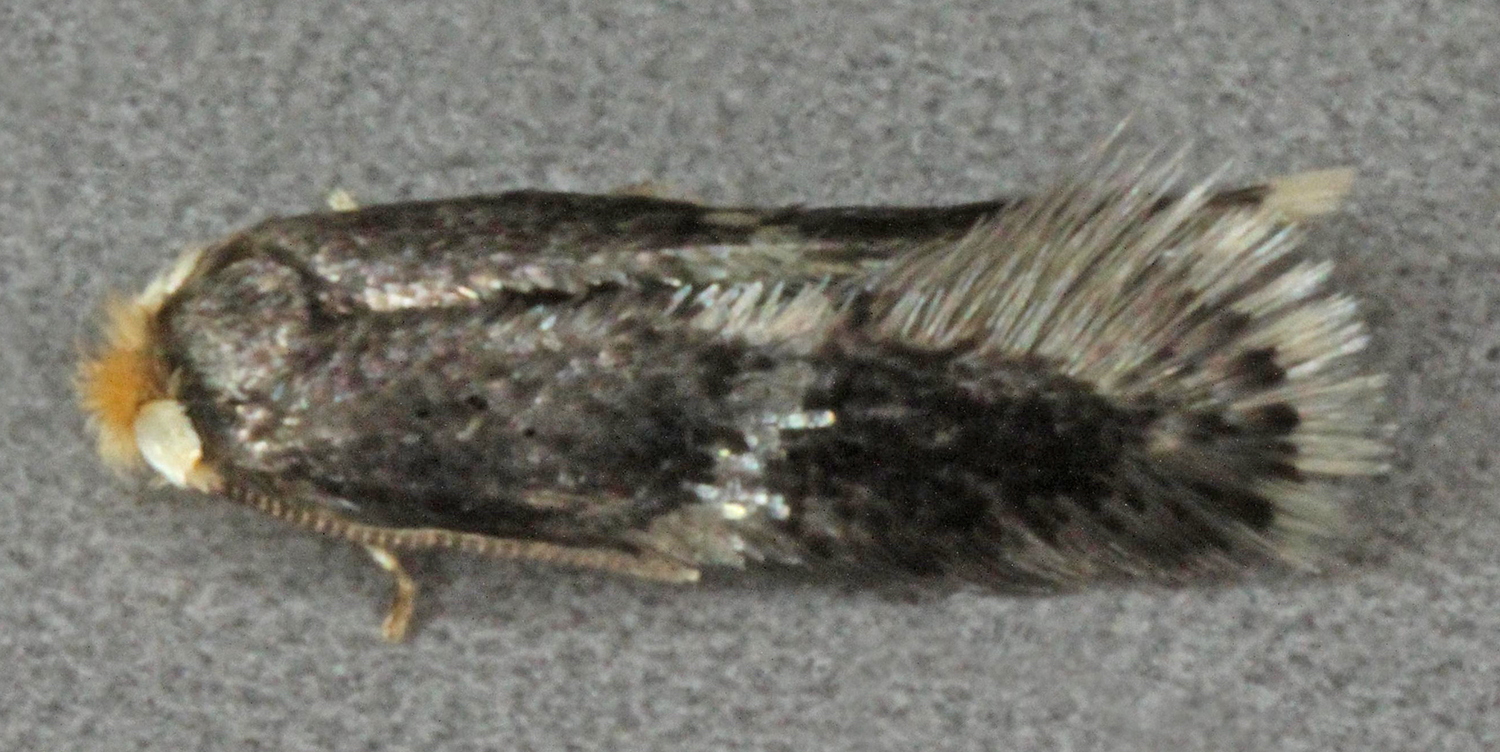
- Ectoedemia albifasciella, Wepre, North Wales, July 2013

Scientific classification
- Kingdom: Animalia
- Phylum: Arthropoda
- Clade: Pancrustacea
- Class: Insecta
- Order: Lepidoptera
- Family: Nepticulidae
- Genus: Ectoedemia
- Species: E. albifasciella

Binomial name
- Ectoedemia albifasciella (Heinemann, 1871)

Synonyms
- Nepticula albifasciella Heinemann, 1871; Nepticula subapicella Stainton, 1886; Dechtiria albifasciella (Heinemann, 1871)

= Ectoedemia albifasciella =

Species of moth

Ectoedemia albifasciella is a moth of the family Nepticulidae. It is found in all of Europe except the Mediterranean Islands. In the east it ranges to the Volga and Ural regions of Russia.

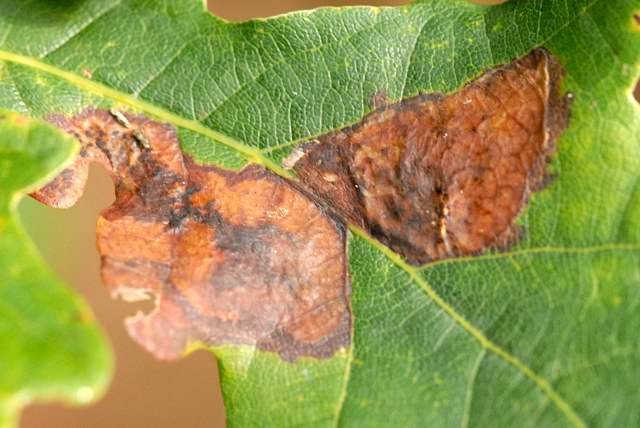
Ectoedemia albifasciella mine

The wingspan is 5–6 mm. The head is orange and the forewings are dark brownish with a broken creamy fascia.

Adults are on wing in June.

The larvae feed on Quercus petraea, Quercus pubescens, Quercus pyrenaica, Quercus robur, Quercus rubra and occasionally also on Castanea sativa. They mine the leaves of their host plant. Pupation takes place outside of the mine.
