= Rothia =

Rothia may refer to

- Rothia (plant) Pers. 1807, a genus of legumes in the family Fabaceae
- Rothia Schreb. 1791, an illegitimate synonym of the aster genus, Andryala
- Rothia Borkh. 1792, an illegitimate synonym of the grass genus, Mibora
- Rothia Lam. 1792, an illegitimate synonym of the aster genus, Schkuhria
- Rothia (moth) Westwood, 1877, a genus of moths in the family Noctuidae
- Rothia (bacterium) Georg and Brown 1967, a genus of bacteria in the family Micrococcaceae
