= Crombrugghia kollari =

Scientific classification
- Domain: Eukaryota
- Kingdom: Animalia
- Phylum: Arthropoda
- Class: Insecta
- Order: Lepidoptera
- Family: Pterophoridae
- Genus: Crombrugghia
- Species: C. kollari

Binomial name
- Crombrugghia kollari (Stainton, 1851)

Synonyms
- Pterophorus kollari Stainton, 1851; Oxyptilus kollari

Species of plume moth

Crombrugghia kollari is a moth of the family Pterophoridae. It is found in Spain, Italy, France, Austria and Switzerland and has also been recorded from southern Russia and Turkey. It is an Alpine species.

It is a little larger than Crombrugghia tristis.

The larvae feed on the leaves of Hieracium amplexicaule. Larvae can be found from the beginning of May to the beginning of June.
