= Thymopsis =

Thymopsis is the scientific name of two genera of organisms and may refer to:

- Thymopsis (crustacean), a genus of lobsters in the family Nephropidae
- Thymopsis (plant), a genus of plants in the family Asteraceae
