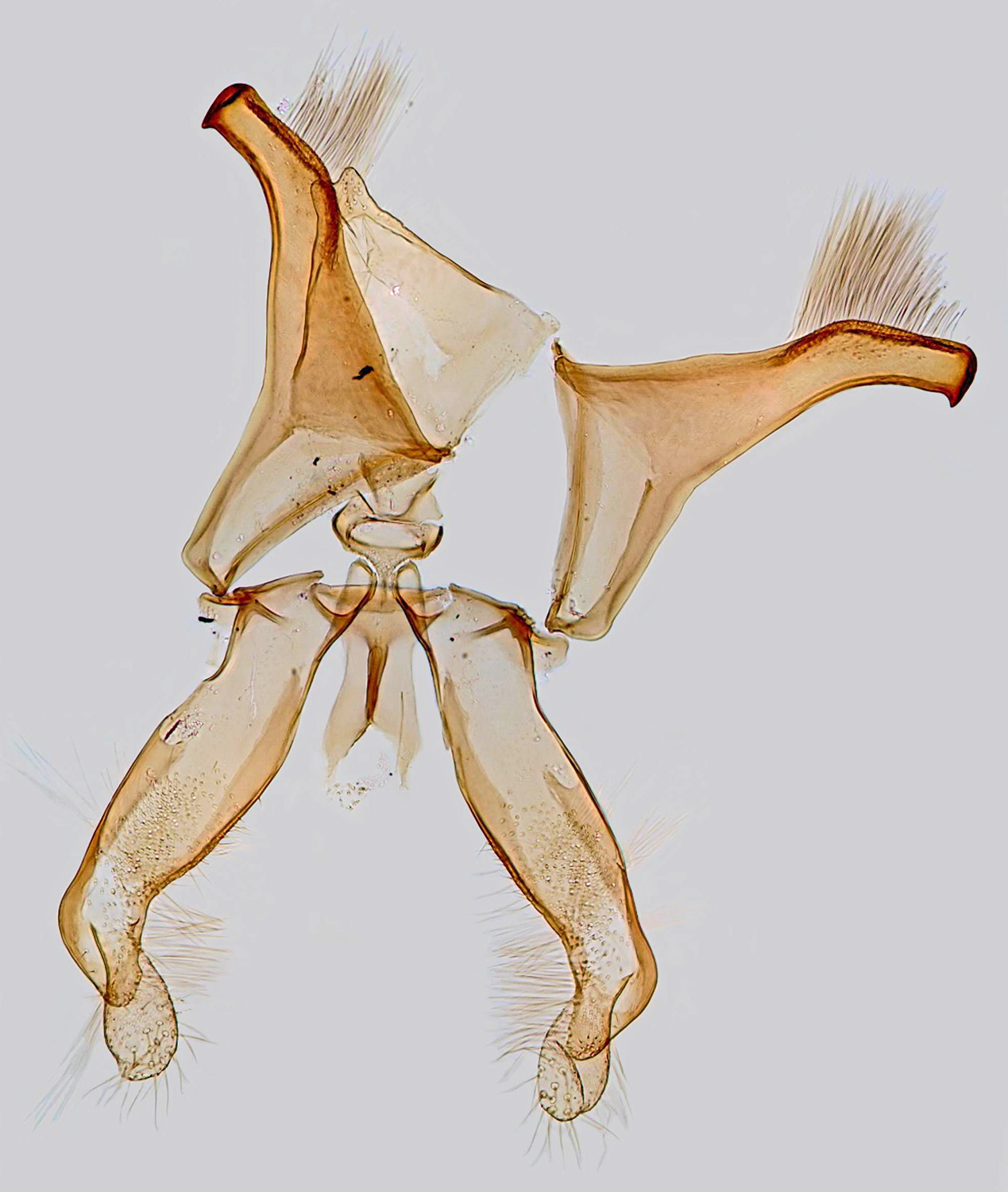
- Cronbrugghia laetus male genitalia preparation
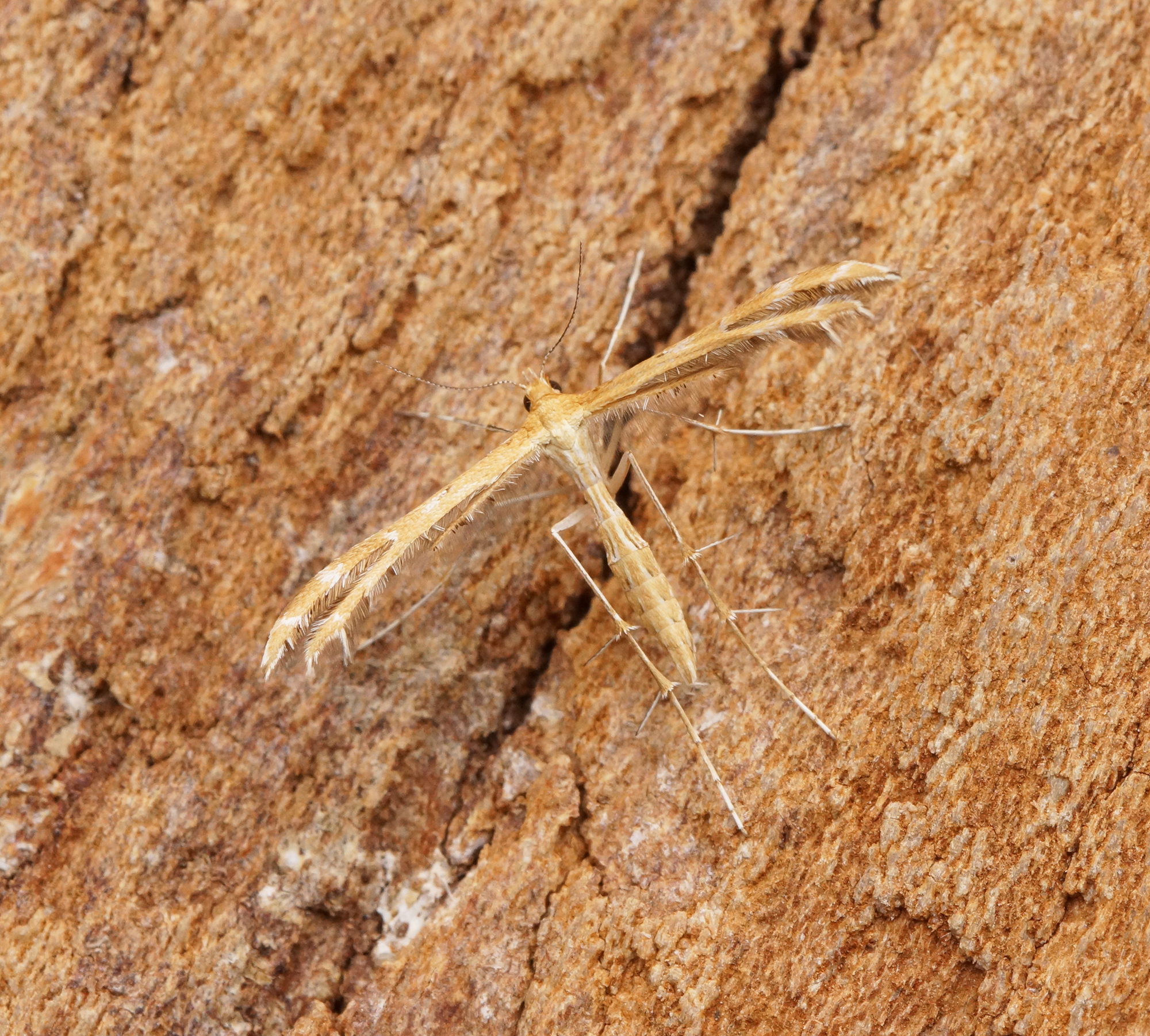
- imago Dorset, England

Scientific classification
- Kingdom: Animalia
- Phylum: Arthropoda
- Clade: Pancrustacea
- Class: Insecta
- Order: Lepidoptera
- Family: Pterophoridae
- Genus: Crombrugghia
- Species: C. laetus

Binomial name
- Crombrugghia laetus (Zeller, 1847)

Synonyms
- List: Oxyptilus laetus (Zeller, 1847); Pterophorus laetus Zeller, 1847; Oxyptilus lantoscanus Milliere, 1883; Pterophorus loetidactylus Bruand d'Uzelle, 1859

= Crombrugghia laetus =

Species of plume moth

Crombrugghia laetus, also known as the scarce light plume, is a moth of the family Pterophoridae, found in southern Europe, North Africa, the Canary Islands, Asia Minor and Iraq. It was first described by the German entomologist, Philipp Christoph Zeller in 1847.

== Description ==
The forewings are light brownish-ochreous, more or less suffused with fuscous with two obscure whitish bars on the segments. The cilia have a few black scales. The costal and dorsal have whitish bars. The hindwings are dark grey. The dorsal scale-tooth at 2/3 is small.

The wingspan is 14–23 millimetres (0.55–0.91 in).

The larvae feed on the flowers of Andryala species including common Andryala (Andryala integrifolia), Andryala pinnatifida and Hieracium tomentosum.
