= Christian Schkuhr =

German gardener, artist and botanist

Christian Schkuhr (14 May 1741, Pegau – 17 July 1811, Wittenberg) was a German gardener, artist and botanist.

He studied at the University of Wittenberg; while continuing to work as a gardener, he also became a master of design and engraving. An adherent of Linnaean taxonomy, he devoted himself to studying the flora of Wittenberg.

The genus Schkuhria was named after him by Conrad Moench (now considered synonymous with Sigesbeckia). He is also commemorated with the genus Platyschkuhria (A.Gray) Rydb..

== Principal works ==
- Botanisches Handbuch der mehresten theils in Deutschland wildwachsenden : theils ausländischen in Deutschland unter freyem Himmel ausdauernden Gewächse, 1791 – Manual of botany.
- Beschreibung und Abbildung der Theils bekannten, Theils noch nicht beschriebenen Arten von Riedgräsern nach eigenen Beobachtungen und vergrösserter Darstellung der kleinsten Theile, 1801.
- Histoire des Carex ou laiches, contenant la description et les figures coloriées de toutes les espèces connues et d'un grand nombre d'espèces nouvelles. 1802 – Monograph on sedges, containing descriptions and colored figures of all known species and a large number of new species.
- Deutschlands kryptogamische Gewächse. 1804 German cryptogamic plants.
