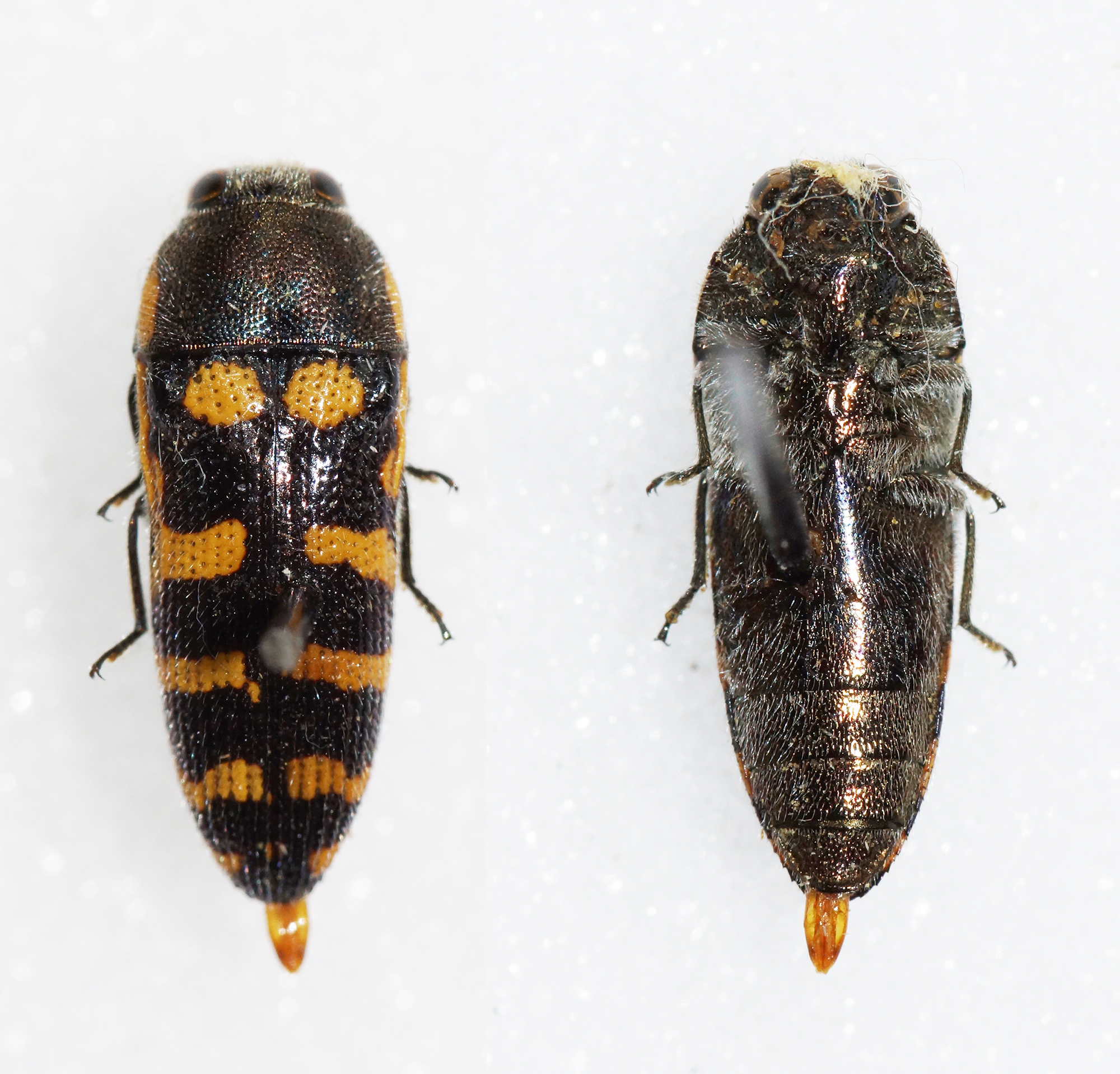
- Acmaeodera alicia beetles

Scientific classification
- Kingdom: Animalia
- Phylum: Arthropoda
- Clade: Pancrustacea
- Class: Insecta
- Order: Coleoptera
- Suborder: Polyphaga
- Infraorder: Elateriformia
- Family: Buprestidae
- Genus: Acmaeodera
- Species: A. alicia

Binomial name
- Acmaeodera alicia Fall, 1899

= Acmaeodera alicia =

Species of beetle

Acmaeodera alicia is a species of metallic wood-boring beetle in the family Buprestidae. It is found in Central America, Mexico, and the Southwest United States. Larval hosts include Acacia and Cercidium and adult hosts include Baileya, Ferocactus, and Hymenothrix.
