= B. bigelovii =

B. bigelovii may refer to:

- Baccharis bigelovii, Bigelow's false willow, a flowering plant species
- Bahia bigelovii, Bigelow's bahia, a flowering plant species
- Bidens bigelovii, Bigelow's beggarticks, a flowering plant species
- Brandegea bigelovii, the desert starvine, a flowering plant species
