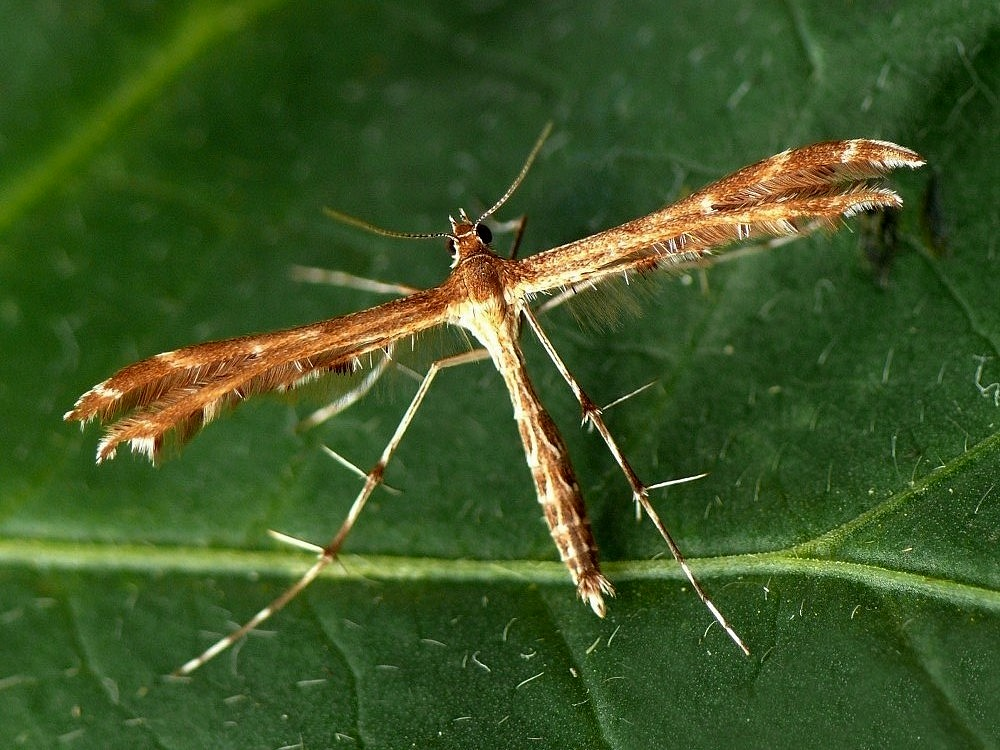

Scientific classification
- Kingdom: Animalia
- Phylum: Arthropoda
- Clade: Pancrustacea
- Class: Insecta
- Order: Lepidoptera
- Family: Pterophoridae
- Genus: Crombrugghia
- Species: C. distans

Binomial name
- Crombrugghia distans (Zeller, 1847)

Synonyms
- List: Oxyptilus distans (Zeller, 1847); Oxyptilus adamczewskii Bigot & Picard, 1988; Oxyptilus buvati Bigot & Picard, 1988; Oxyptilus clarisignis Meyrick, 1924; Oxyptilus gibeauxi Bigot, Nel & Picard, 1990; Oxyptilus jaeckhi Bigot & Picard, 1991; Oxyptilus pravieli Bigot, Nel & Picard, 1989; Oxyptilus propedistans Bigot & Picard, 1988; Oxyptilus lactucae T. B. Fletcher, 1920

= Crombrugghia distans =

Species of plume moth

Crombrugghia distans, also known as the Breckland plume, is a moth of the family Pterophoridae found in Africa, Asia and Europe. It was first described by Philipp Christoph Zeller in 1847.

== Description ==
The wingspan is 15–22 millimetres (0.59–0.87 in). Adults are on wing from April to June and again from July to September in two generations in western Europe. The moth is easily disturbed during the day, especially in hot weather, flies from dusk and occasionally comes to light. The scarce light plume (Crombrugghia laetus) is similar and examination of the genitalia is necessary if it is suspected to be this species.

The larvae feed on smooth hawksbeard (Crepis capillaris), narrow-leaved hawk's-beard (Crepis tectorum), Crepis succifolia, Crepis conyzaefolia, mouse-ear hawkweed (Hieracium pilosella), hawkweed oxtongue (Picris hieracioides), blue heliotrope (Heliotropium amplexicaule), perennial sow-thistle (Sonchus arvensis), prickly sow-thistle (Sonchus asper), Chicory (Cichorium intybus) and Cichorium albida. Larvae of the spring generation feed on the central parts of the plant, while the larvae of the summer generation feed on the flower buds. Full-grown larvae are 7–9 millimetres (0.28–0.35 in) long and orange, bright red or pinkish brown.

== Distribution ==
It is found in almost all of Europe, as well as Asia Minor, North Africa and the Canary Islands. It is also known from Afghanistan, India and Iran.
