= Picradeniopsis oppositifolia =

Scientific classification
- Kingdom: Plantae
- Clade: Tracheophytes
- Clade: Angiosperms
- Clade: Eudicots
- Clade: Asterids
- Order: Asterales
- Family: Asteraceae
- Genus: Picradeniopsis
- Species: P. oppositifolia

Binomial name
- Picradeniopsis oppositifolia (Nutt.) Rydb.

Synonyms
- List: Bahia oppositifolia (Nutt.) A.Gray; Bahia oppositifolia Nutt.; Bahia oppositifolia (Nutt.) DC.; Eriophyllum oppositifolium (Nutt.) Kuntze; Eriophyllum oppositifolium (Nutt.) Heynh.; Eriophyllum oppositifolium (Nutt.) Paxton; Helenium oppositifolium (Nutt.) Spreng.; Trichophyllum oppositifolium Nutt.

Species of flowering plant

Picradeniopsis oppositifolia, the plains bahia or the opposite-leaved bahia, is a species of false bahia native to the United States and Canada.
