= Crombrugghia reichli =

Scientific classification
- Domain: Eukaryota
- Kingdom: Animalia
- Phylum: Arthropoda
- Class: Insecta
- Order: Lepidoptera
- Family: Pterophoridae
- Genus: Crombrugghia
- Species: C. reichli

Binomial name
- Crombrugghia reichli Arenberger, 1998

Species of plume moth

Crombrugghia reichli is a moth of the family Pterophoridae. It is found in the eastern Mediterranean region, including Cyprus and Turkey.

The wingspan is 19–24 millimetres (0.75–0.94 in). Adults are on wing in May (Turkey) and from July to August (in Cyprus). There is one or possibly two generations per year.
