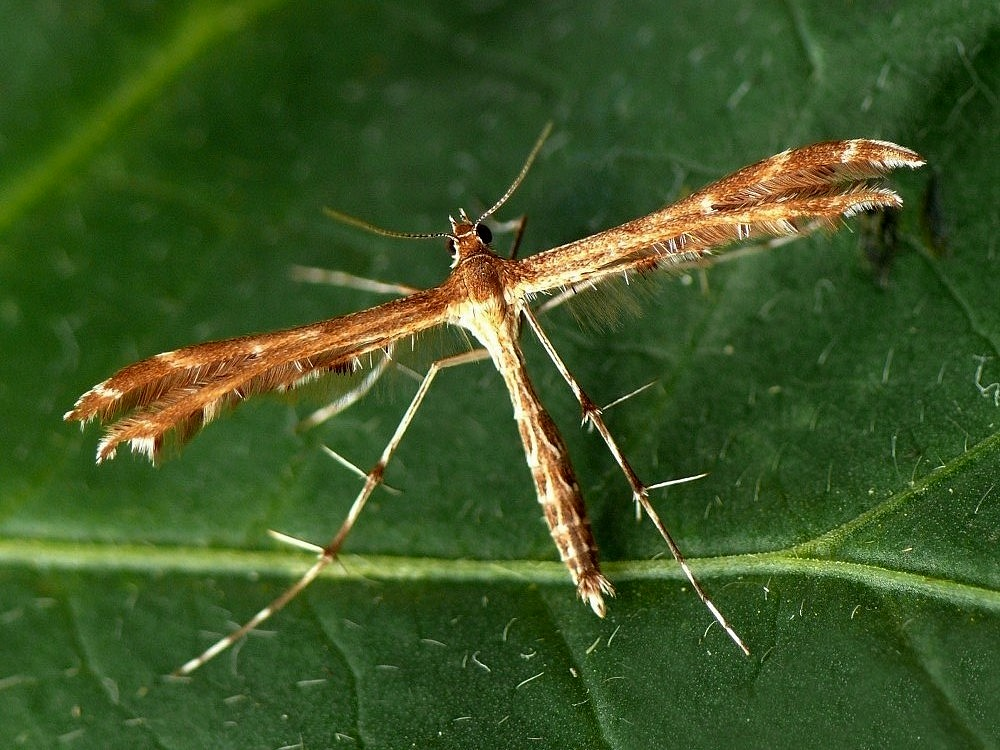
- Crombrugghia distans

Scientific classification
- Domain: Eukaryota
- Kingdom: Animalia
- Phylum: Arthropoda
- Class: Insecta
- Order: Lepidoptera
- Family: Pterophoridae
- Tribe: Oxyptilini
- Genus: Crombrugghia; Tutt, 1906

= Crombrugghia =

Plume moth genus

Crombrugghia is a genus of moths in the family Pterophoridae. It was erected by James William Tutt in 1906.

== Species ==
- Crombrugghia distans (Zeller, 1847)
- Crombrugghia kollari (Stainton, 1851)
- Crombrugghia laetus (Zeller, 1847)
- Crombrugghia reichli Arenberger, 1998
- Crombrugghia tristis (Zeller, 1839)

== Selected former species ==
- Crombrugghia wahlbergi
