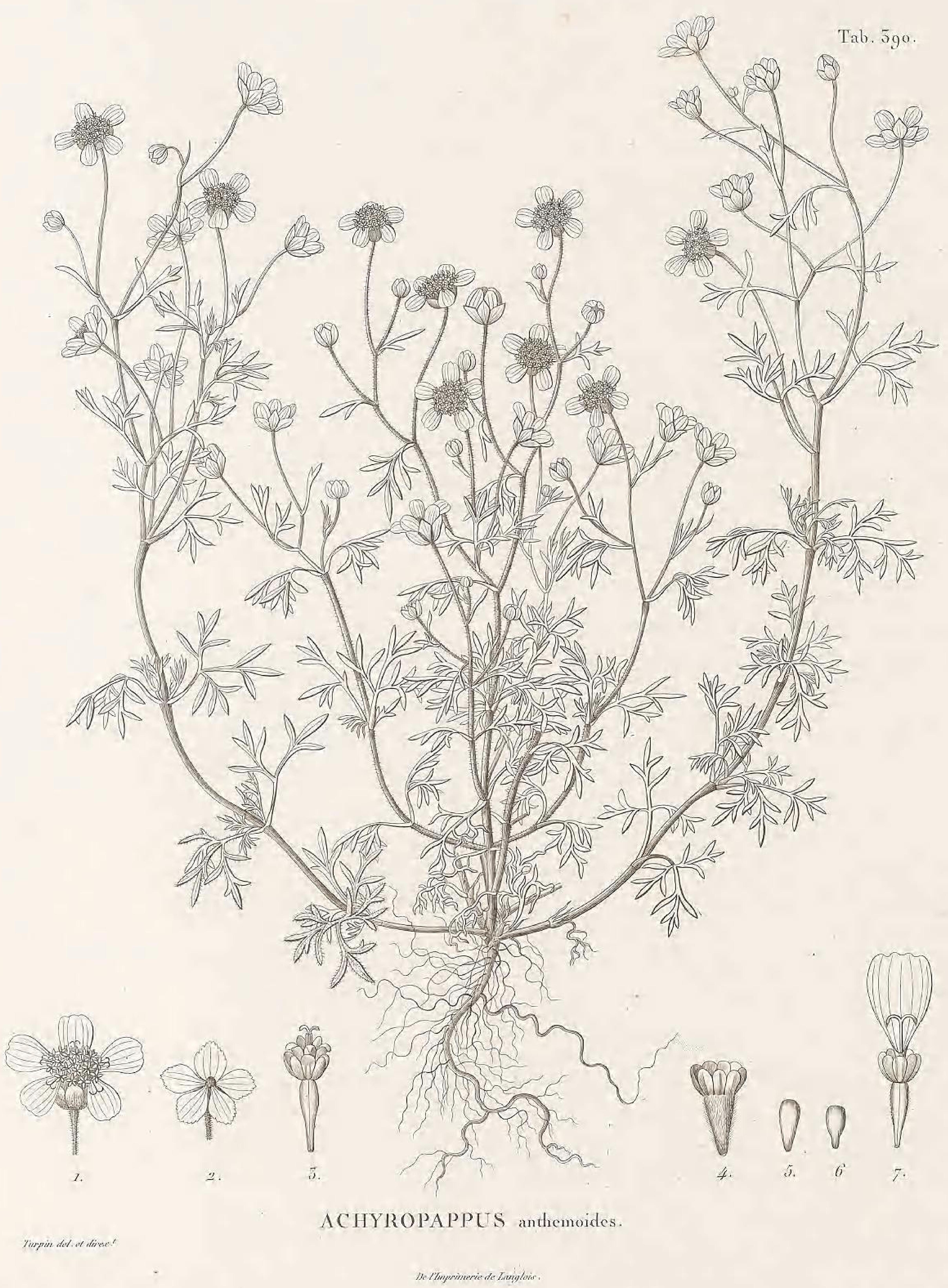

Scientific classification
- Kingdom: Plantae
- Clade: Tracheophytes
- Clade: Angiosperms
- Clade: Eudicots
- Clade: Asterids
- Order: Asterales
- Family: Asteraceae
- Genus: Achyropappus
- Species: A. anthemoides

Binomial name
- Achyropappus anthemoides Kunth

Synonyms
- Actinolepis anthemoides A.Gray; Bahia anthemoides A.Gray; Eriophyllum anthemoides Kuntze; Schkuhria anthemoides Wedd.; Schkuhria pusilla Wedd. ex Benth. & Hook.f.

= Achyropappus anthemoides =

Species of plant

Achyropappus anthemoides is a species of flowering plant in the family Asteraceae, native to Mexico. It was first described by Carl Sigismund Kunth in 1818.
