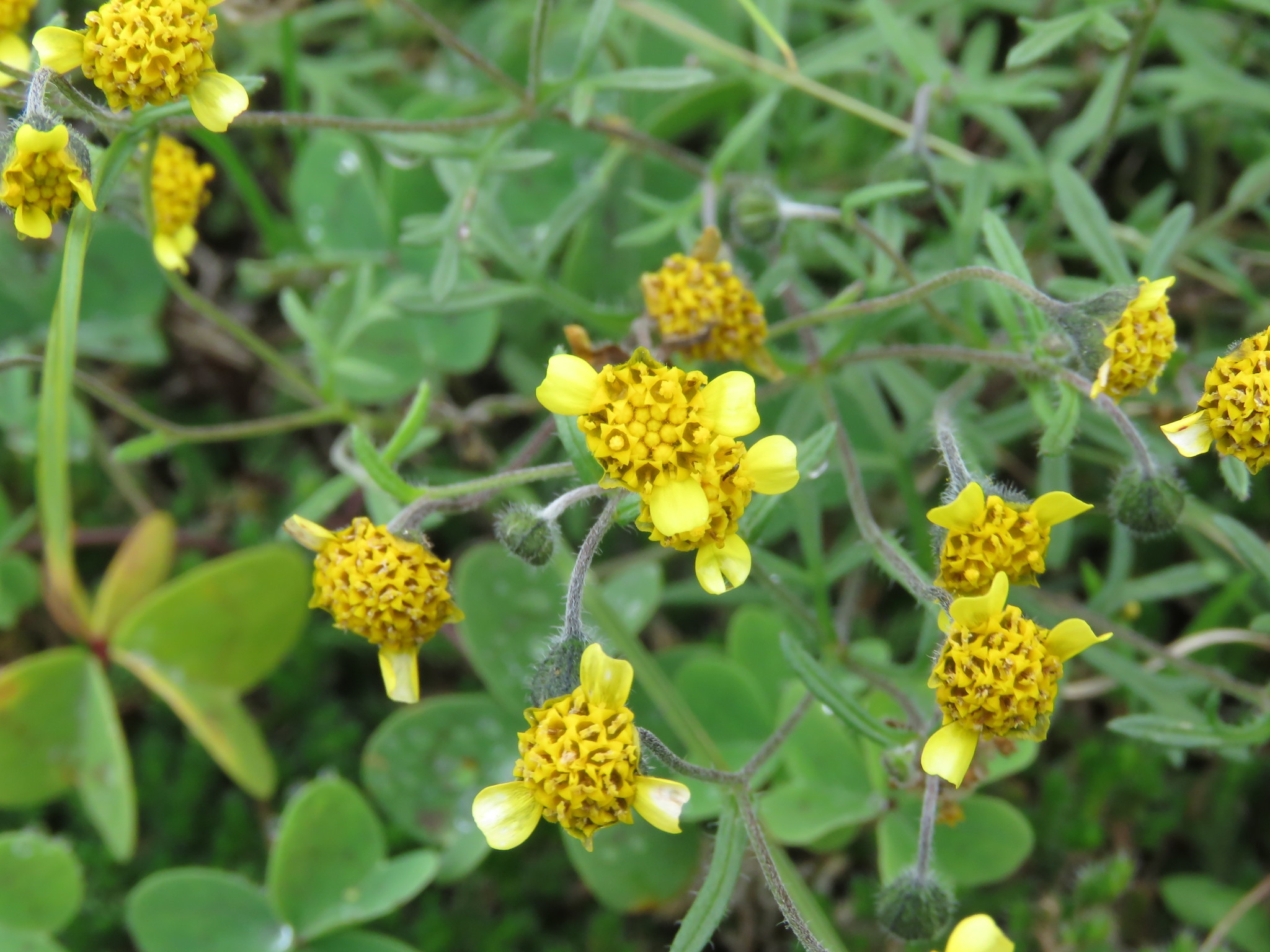

Scientific classification
- Kingdom: Plantae
- Clade: Tracheophytes
- Clade: Angiosperms
- Clade: Eudicots
- Clade: Asterids
- Order: Asterales
- Family: Asteraceae
- Genus: Achyropappus
- Species: A. queretarensis

Binomial name
- Achyropappus queretarensis B.L.Turner

= Achyropappus queretarensis =

Species of plant

Achyropappus queretarensis is a species of flowering plant in the family Asteraceae. It found in northeast Mexico (Guanajuato, Querétaro, Hidalgo). It was first described in 2012 by Billie Lee Turner.
