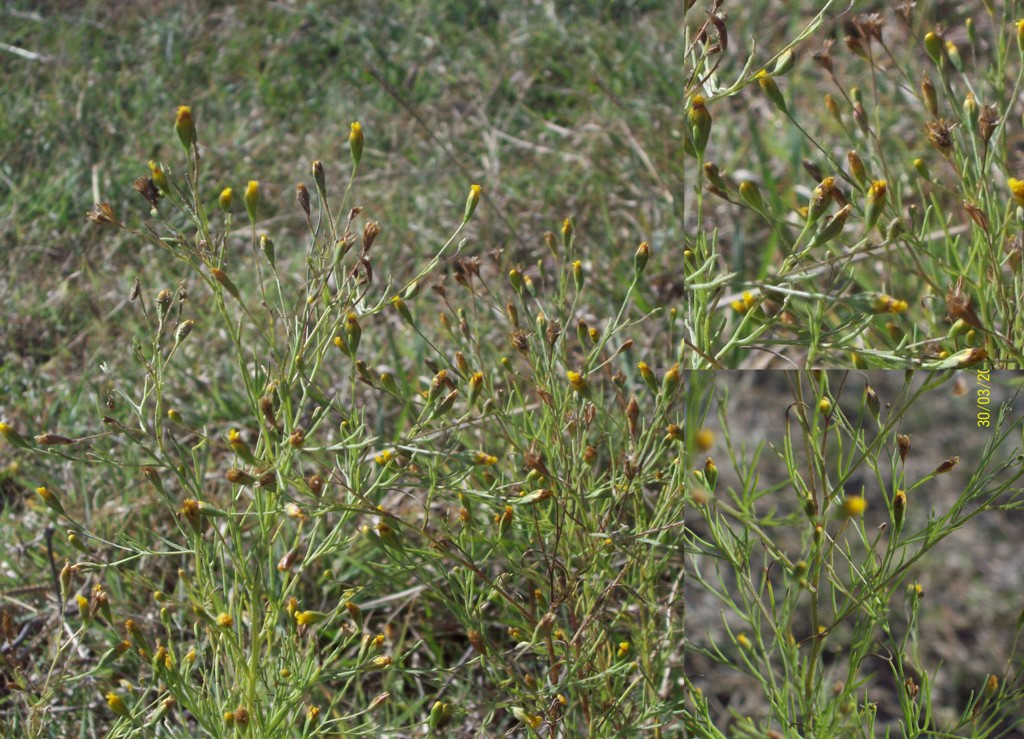
- Schkuhria pinnata

Scientific classification
- Kingdom: Plantae
- Clade: Tracheophytes
- Clade: Angiosperms
- Clade: Eudicots
- Clade: Asterids
- Order: Asterales
- Family: Asteraceae
- Subfamily: Asteroideae
- Tribe: Bahieae
- Genus: Schkuhria; Roth (1797), conserved name, not Moench (1794) (syn of Sigesbeckia)

Type species
- Schkuhria abrotanoides (syn of S. pinnata) Roth

Synonyms
- Chamaestephanum Willd.; Hopkirkia DC.; Mieria La Llave; Tetracarpum Moench

= Schkuhria =

Genus of plants

Schkuhria is a genus of flowering plants in the tribe Bahieae within the family Asteraceae. False threadleaf is a common name. It includes two species native to the Americas, ranging from the south-central United States to Argentina. The genus was named in honour of Christian Schkuhr (1741-1811), a German gardener and physical scientist at the University of Wittenberg.

== Species ==
Two species are accepted.

- Schkuhria pinnata (Lam.) Kuntze ex Thell. - South America, Central America, Mexico, and United States (AZ NM TX)
- Schkuhria schkuhrioides (Link & Otto) Thell. - Mexico (Michoacán, Nayarit, Jalisco, México State, D.F., Durango, Aguascalientes)

=== Formerly placed here ===
- Nothoschkuhria degenerica (Kuntze) B.G.Baldwin (as Schkuhria degenerica (Kuntze) R.E.Fr.)
- Picradeniopsis multiflora (Hook. & Arn.) B.G.Baldwin (as Schkuhria multiflora Hook. & Arn.)
