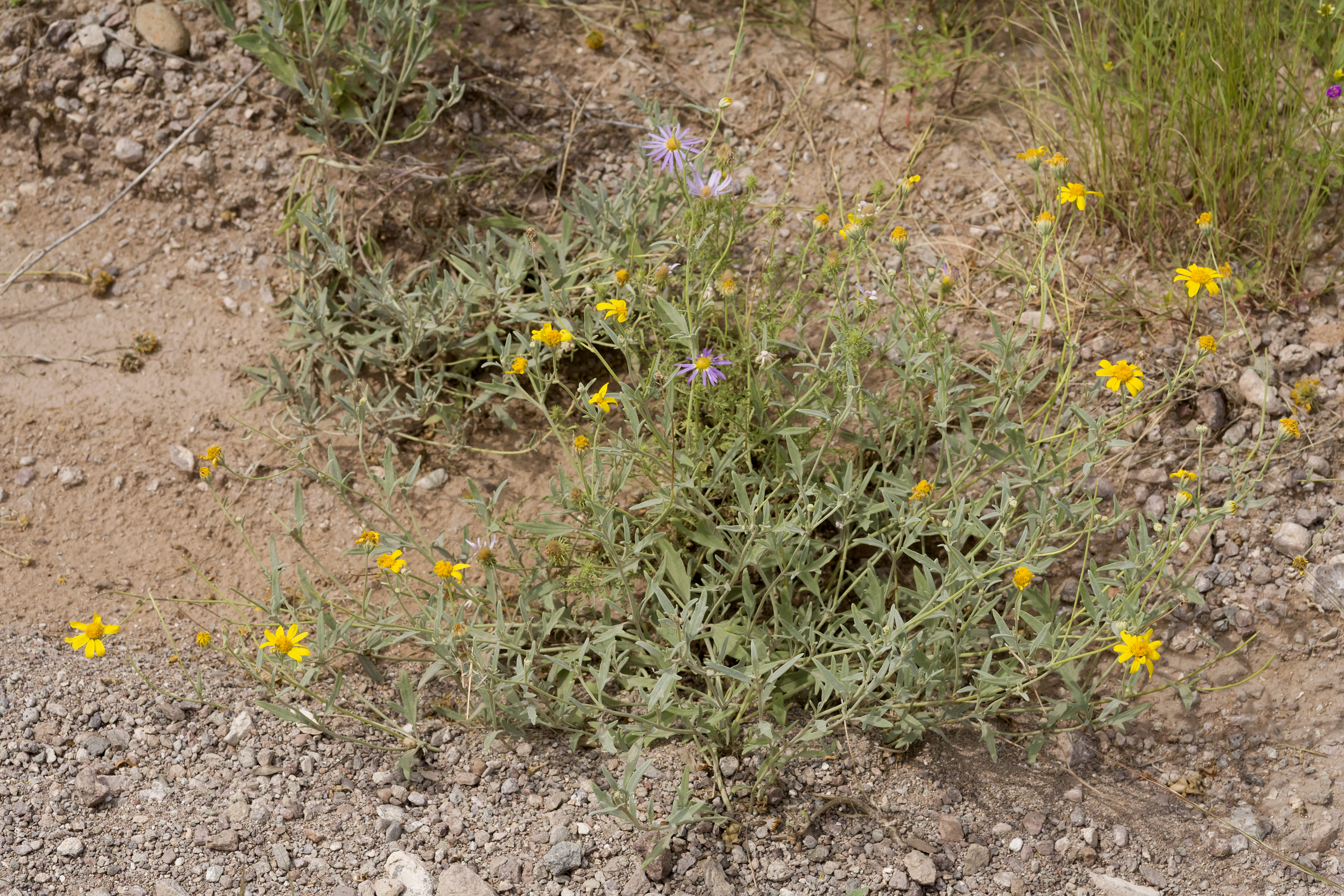

Scientific classification
- Kingdom: Plantae
- Clade: Tracheophytes
- Clade: Angiosperms
- Clade: Eudicots
- Clade: Asterids
- Order: Asterales
- Family: Asteraceae
- Genus: Picradeniopsis
- Species: P. absinthifolia

Binomial name
- Picradeniopsis absinthifolia (Benth.) B.G.Baldwin

Synonyms
- Bahia absinthifolia Benth.; Bahia absinthifolia var. dealbata (A.Gray) A.Gray; Bahia dealbata A.Gray; Eriophyllum absinthiifolium (Benth.) Kuntze; Picradeniopsis dealbata Wooton & Standl.

= Picradeniopsis absinthifolia =

Species of flowering plant

Picradeniopsis absinthifolia, the hairyseed bahia or desert bahia, is a North American species of flowering plants in the family Asteraceae. It is native to Mexico (Tamaulipas, Nuevo León, Coahuila, Chihuahua, San Luis Potosí, Querétaro, Hidalgo, Durango, Aguascalientes) and the south-western United States (Arizona New Mexico Texas; populations reported from Utah appear to be introductions).

Picradeniopsis absinthifolia is a perennial up to 40 cm (16 inches) tall. It has yellow flowers with both ray florets and disc florets. It grows in sandy soil in desert regions.
