= Espejoa =

Scientific classification
- Kingdom: Plantae
- Clade: Tracheophytes
- Clade: Angiosperms
- Clade: Eudicots
- Clade: Asterids
- Order: Asterales
- Family: Asteraceae
- Subfamily: Asteroideae
- Tribe: Bahieae
- Genus: Espejoa; DC.
- Species: E. mexicana

Binomial name
- Espejoa mexicana DC.

Synonyms
- Jaumea mexicana (DC.) Benth. & Hook.f. ex Hemsl.

Genus of flowering plants

Espejoa is a genus of Mesoamerican flowering plants in the daisy family.

There is only one known species, Espejoa mexicana, native to Chiapas, Oaxaca, Guatemala, Honduras, El Salvador, Costa Rica.
