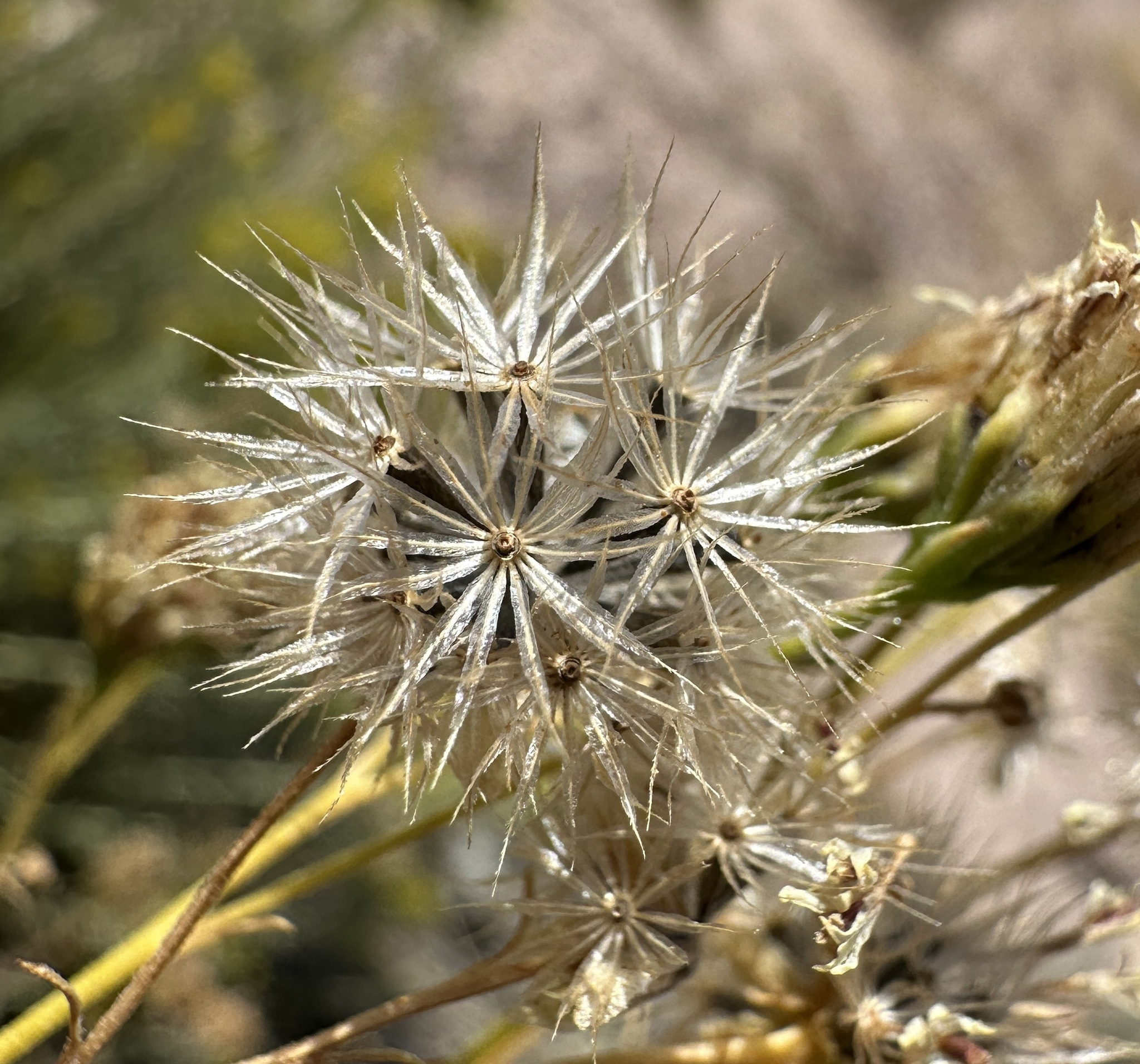

Conservation status
- Vulnerable (NatureServe)

Scientific classification
- Kingdom: Plantae
- Clade: Tracheophytes
- Clade: Angiosperms
- Clade: Eudicots
- Clade: Asterids
- Order: Asterales
- Family: Asteraceae
- Genus: Hymenothrix
- Species: H. loomisii

Binomial name
- Hymenothrix loomisii S.F.Blake 1927

Synonyms
- Hutchinsonia hyalina M.E.Jones

= Hymenothrix loomisii =

Species of flowering plant

Hymenothrix loomisii, the Loomis' thimblehead, is a North American species of flowering plant in the daisy family. It grows in the southwestern United States (Arizona, New Mexico, southern Nevada), and also in the Sierra Madre Occidental in western Chihuahua. There have been reports of populations in southern California but these are most likely introductions.

Hymenothrix loomisii is an annual herb up to 70 cm (28 in) tall. Each head has 10-20 yellow or cream-colored disc flowers but no ray flowers.
