= Florestina tripteris =

Scientific classification
- Kingdom: Plantae
- Clade: Tracheophytes
- Clade: Angiosperms
- Clade: Eudicots
- Clade: Asterids
- Order: Asterales
- Family: Asteraceae
- Genus: Florestina
- Species: F. tripteris

Binomial name
- Florestina tripteris DC. 1836

Synonyms
- Palafoxia tripteris (DC.) Shinners

Species of flowering plant

Florestina tripteris, the sticky florestina, is a North American species of flowering plants in the sunflower family. It is found in Mexico (from Chihuahua and Nuevo León as far south as Guerrero) and in the south-central United States (Texas).

Florestina tripteris is a perennial herb up to 60 cm (2 feet) tall. One plant produces many flower heads in a branching array. Each head contains as many as 30 white disc flowers but no ray flowers. The species grows in open, sunlit locations.
