= Holoschkuhria =

Scientific classification
- Kingdom: Plantae
- Clade: Embryophytes
- Clade: Tracheophytes
- Clade: Angiosperms
- Clade: Eudicots
- Clade: Asterids
- Order: Asterales
- Family: Asteraceae
- Subfamily: Asteroideae
- Tribe: Bahieae
- Genus: Holoschkuhria; H.Rob.
- Species: H. tetramera

Binomial name
- Holoschkuhria tetramera H.Rob.

Synonyms
- Holoschkuhria peruviana H.Rob., not validly published, apparently printed in error

Species of plant

Holoschkuhria is a genus of Peruvian flowering plants in the daisy family (Asteraceae or Compositae).

== Species ==
The only known species is Holoschkuhria tetramera, native to northern Peru.
