= Picradeniopsis woodhousei =

Scientific classification
- Kingdom: Plantae
- Clade: Tracheophytes
- Clade: Angiosperms
- Clade: Eudicots
- Clade: Asterids
- Order: Asterales
- Family: Asteraceae
- Genus: Picradeniopsis
- Species: P. woodhousei

Binomial name
- Picradeniopsis woodhousei (A.Gray) Rydb.

Synonyms
- Achyropappus woodhousei A.Gray; Bahia woodhousei (A.Gray) A.Gray; Eriophyllum woodhousei (A.Gray) Kuntze; Schkuhria woodhousei (A.Gray) A.Gray

Species of flowering plant

Picradeniopsis woodhousei, Woodhouse's bahia, is a species of flowering plant native to the United States.
