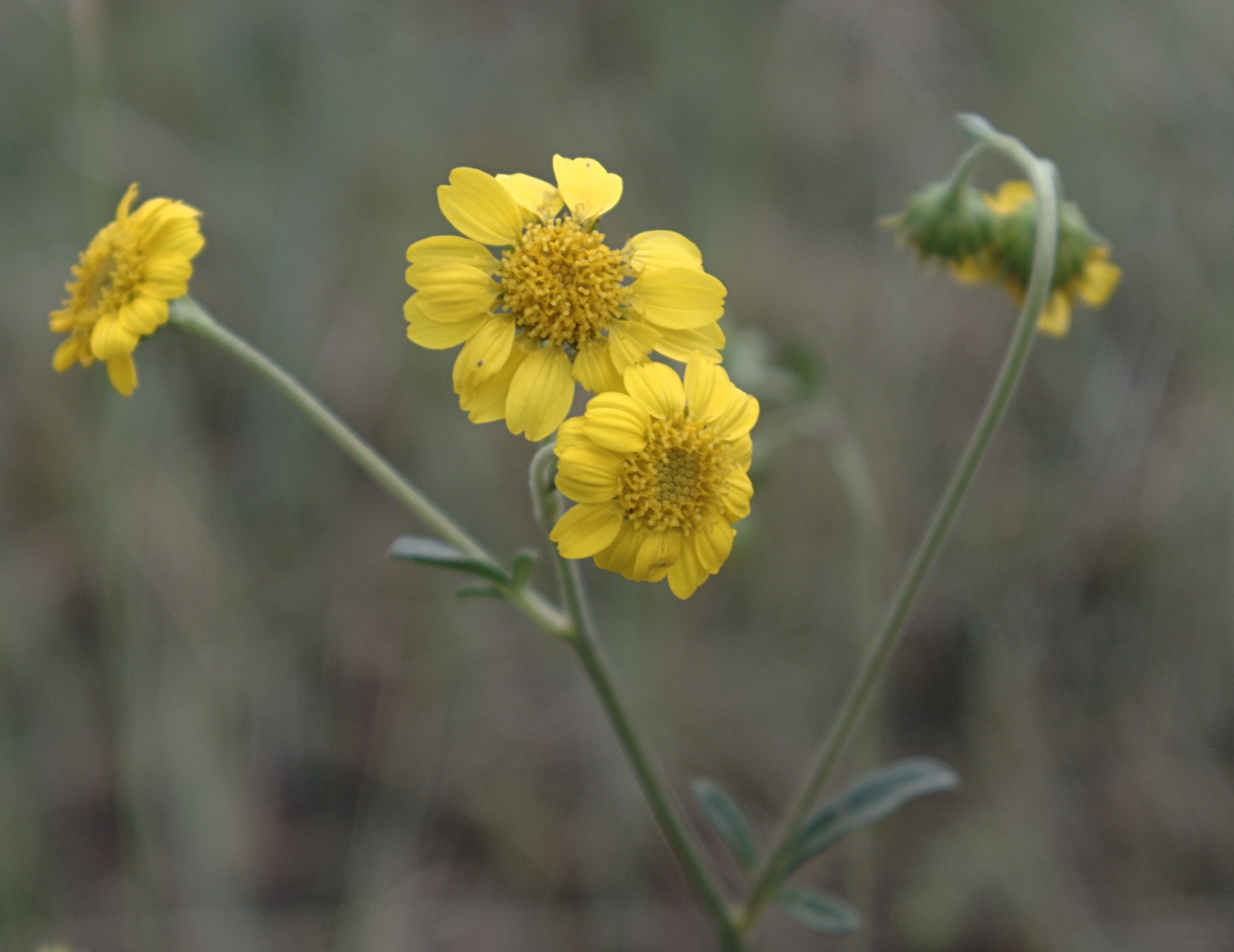

Conservation status
- Secure (NatureServe)

Scientific classification
- Kingdom: Plantae
- Clade: Tracheophytes
- Clade: Angiosperms
- Clade: Eudicots
- Clade: Asterids
- Order: Asterales
- Family: Asteraceae
- Genus: Hymenothrix
- Species: H. dissecta

Binomial name
- Hymenothrix dissecta (A. Gray) B.G.Baldwin

Synonyms
- Amauria dissecta A.Gray; Amauriopsis dissecta (A.Gray) Rydb.; Bahia chrysanthemoides (A.Gray) A.Gray; Bahia dissecta Britton; Bahia dissecta var. anisopappa S.F.Blake; Eriophyllum chrysanthemodes (A.Gray) Kuntze; Villanova chrysanthemoides A.Gray; Villanova dissecta Rydb.

= Hymenothrix dissecta =

Species of flowering plant

Hymenothrix dissecta is a North American species of flowering plants in the family Asteraceae known by the common names yellow ragweed and ragleaf bahia. It is native to the western United States as far north as the Black Hills of South Dakota and Wyoming, as well as in northern Mexico (Baja California, Chihuahua, Coahuila, Sonora).

Hymenothrix dissecta can be found in several habitat types, from dry mountain slopes to roadsides. This is an annual or biennial herb producing a spindly, branching, erect stem variable in height from 20 centimeters to well over one meter. The stems are reddish and generally glandular. The small leaves are mostly located toward the base of the stem and are finely divided into linear lobes. The spreading inflorescence produces several flower heads, each lined with hairy, glandular phyllaries. Each head has a fringe of rounded yellow ray florets about half a centimeter long and a center of yellow disc florets. The fruit is a dark-colored achene 3 or 4 millimeters long. If there is any pappus it is small and scale-like.

American botanist Asa Gray described the species as Amauria dissecta in 1849 from material collected in a valley between Guajuquilla and Mapimi in Chihuahua. It placed in the new genus Hymenothrix by Bruce Gregg Baldwin in 2016.
