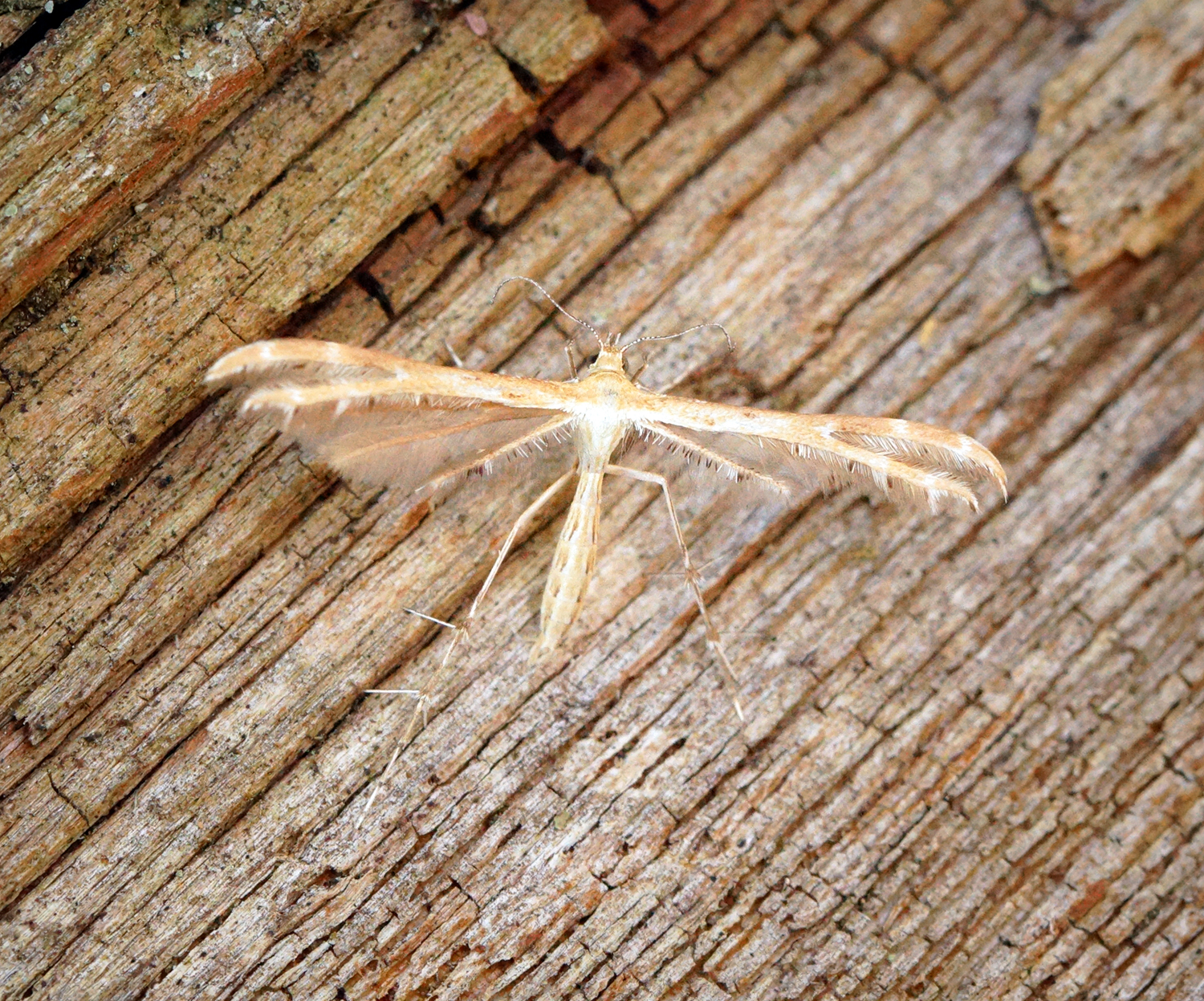

Scientific classification
- Domain: Eukaryota
- Kingdom: Animalia
- Phylum: Arthropoda
- Class: Insecta
- Order: Lepidoptera
- Family: Pterophoridae
- Genus: Crombrugghia
- Species: C. tristis

Binomial name
- Crombrugghia tristis (Zeller, 1841)

Synonyms
- Pterophorus tristis Zeller, 1841; Oxyptilus tristis

= Crombrugghia tristis =

Species of plume moth

Crombrugghia tristis is a moth of the family Pterophoridae. It is found in most of Europe, except the Benelux, Great Britain, Ireland and Scandinavia. It is also known from southern Siberia, Asia Minor and central Asia. The habitat consists of sandy areas overgrown with Hieracium.

The wingspan is 16–17 millimetres (0.63–0.67 in), making it the smallest species in the genus Crombrugghia. It is greyish, light-brown coloured.

The larvae feed on Hieracium echioides, Hieracium umbeliferum, Hieracium dubium, Hieracium cymosum, Hieracium piloselloides, Hieracium fallax, Hieracium pilosella and Hieracium amplexicaule.
