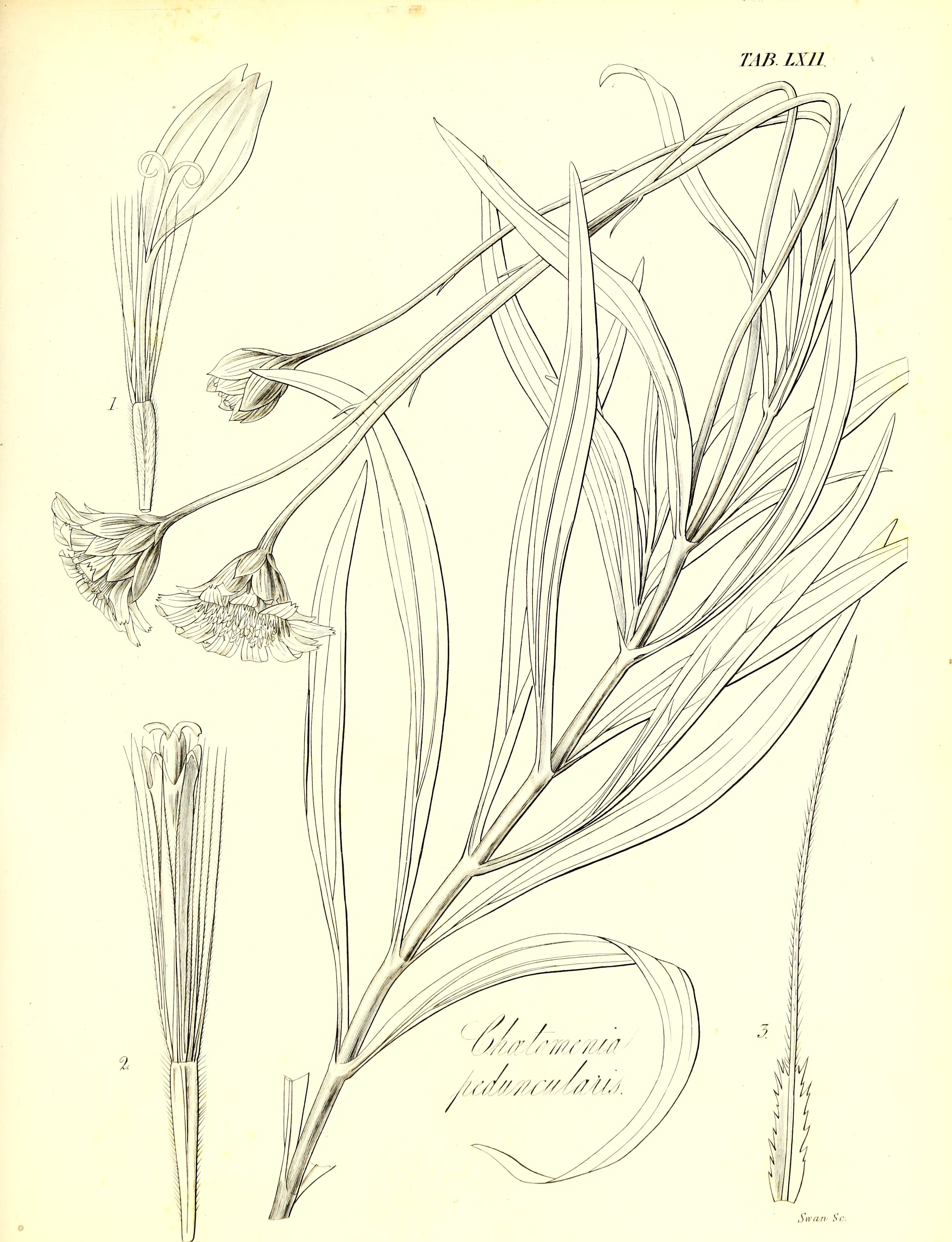
- Chaetymenia peduncularis

Scientific classification
- Kingdom: Plantae
- Clade: Embryophytes
- Clade: Tracheophytes
- Clade: Angiosperms
- Clade: Eudicots
- Clade: Asterids
- Order: Asterales
- Family: Asteraceae
- Subfamily: Asteroideae
- Tribe: Bahieae
- Genus: Chaetymenia; Hook. & Arn.
- Species: C. peduncularis

Binomial name
- Chaetymenia peduncularis Hook. & Arn.

Synonyms
- Chaetomenia Hook. & Arn.; Chaethymenia Hook. & Arn.; Jaumea peduncularis (Hook. & Arn.) Benth. & Hook.f. ex Oliv.; Chaetomenia peduncularis Hook. & Arn.

= Chaetymenia =

Genus of flowering plants

Chaetymenia is a genus of flowering plants in the daisy family.

There is only one known species, Chaetymenia peduncularis, endemic to Mexico.
