= Hypericophyllum =

Scientific classification
- Kingdom: Plantae
- Clade: Tracheophytes
- Clade: Angiosperms
- Clade: Eudicots
- Clade: Asterids
- Order: Asterales
- Family: Asteraceae
- Subfamily: Asteroideae
- Tribe: Bahieae
- Genus: Hypericophyllum; Steetz

Type species
- Hypericophyllum compositarum Steetz

Genus of flowering plants

Hypericophyllum is a genus of African flowering plants in the daisy family.

Species

- Hypericophyllum altissimum (Klatt) J.-P.Lebrun & Stork
- Hypericophyllum angolense (O.Hoffm.) N.E.Br.
- Hypericophyllum brevipapposum Gilli
- Hypericophyllum compositarum Steetz
- Hypericophyllum congoense (O.Hoffm.) N.E.Br.
- Hypericophyllum elatum (O.Hoffm.) N.E.Br.
- Hypericophyllum gossweileri S.Moore
- Hypericophyllum hessii (Merxm.) G.V.Pope
- Hypericophyllum multicaule Hutch.
- Hypericophyllum nyassicum Gilli
- Hypericophyllum speciosum (Lawalrée) Gilli
- Hypericophyllum tessmannii (Mattf.) G.V.Pope
