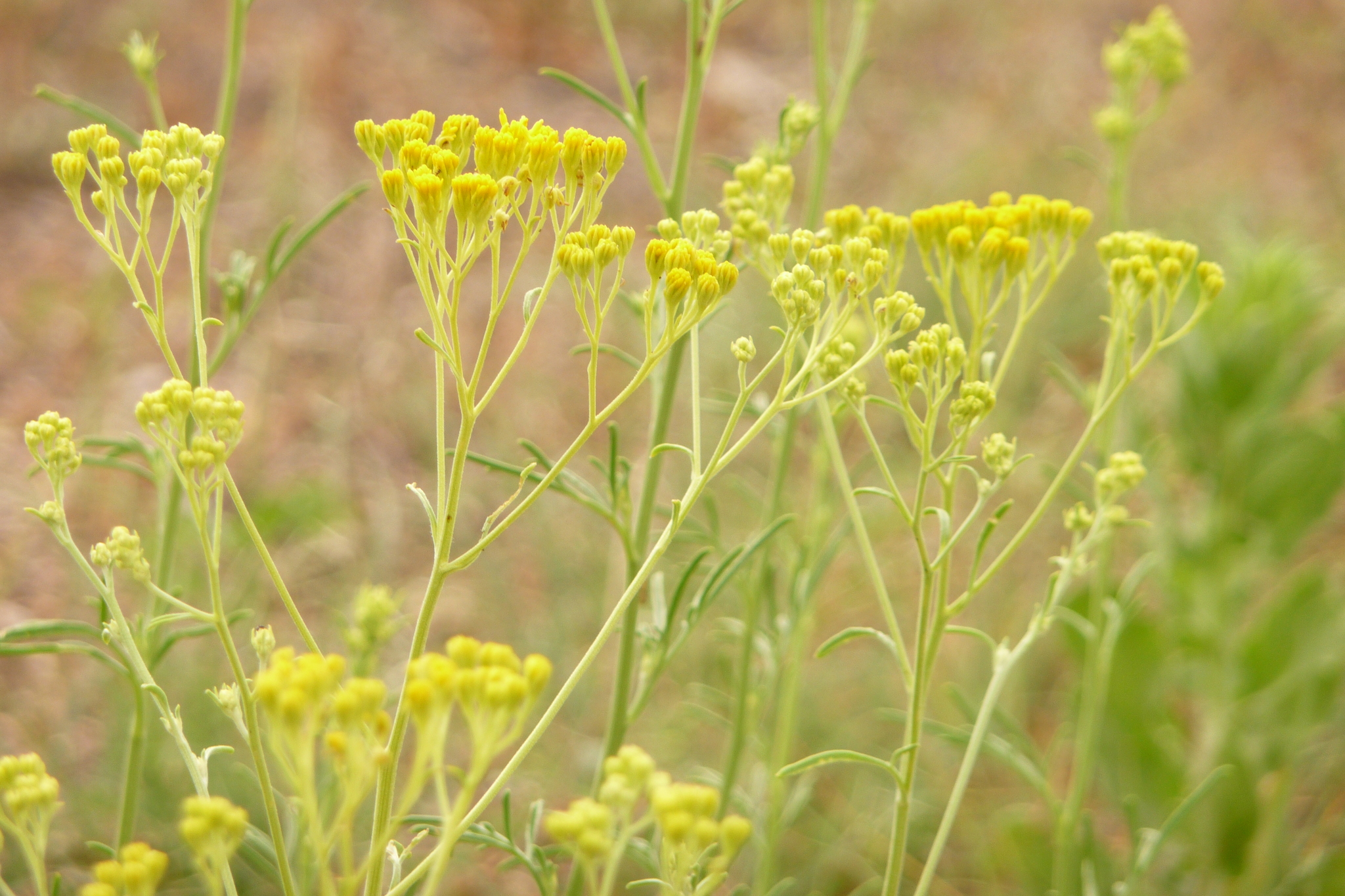

Scientific classification
- Kingdom: Plantae
- Clade: Tracheophytes
- Clade: Angiosperms
- Clade: Eudicots
- Clade: Asterids
- Order: Asterales
- Family: Asteraceae
- Genus: Hymenothrix
- Species: H. wislizeni

Binomial name
- Hymenothrix wislizeni A.Gray 1849

= Hymenothrix wislizeni =

Species of flowering plant

Hymenothrix wislizeni, the Trans-Pecos thimblehead, is a North American species of flowering plant in the daisy family. It grows in northwestern Mexico (Baja California, Sonora, Chihuahua) and the southwestern United States (far western Texas, Arizona, New Mexico).

Hymenothrix wislizeni is an annual herb up to 70 cm (28 in) tall. Each head has 15-30 yellow or cream-colored disc flowers surrounded by 8-12 yellow ray flowers.
