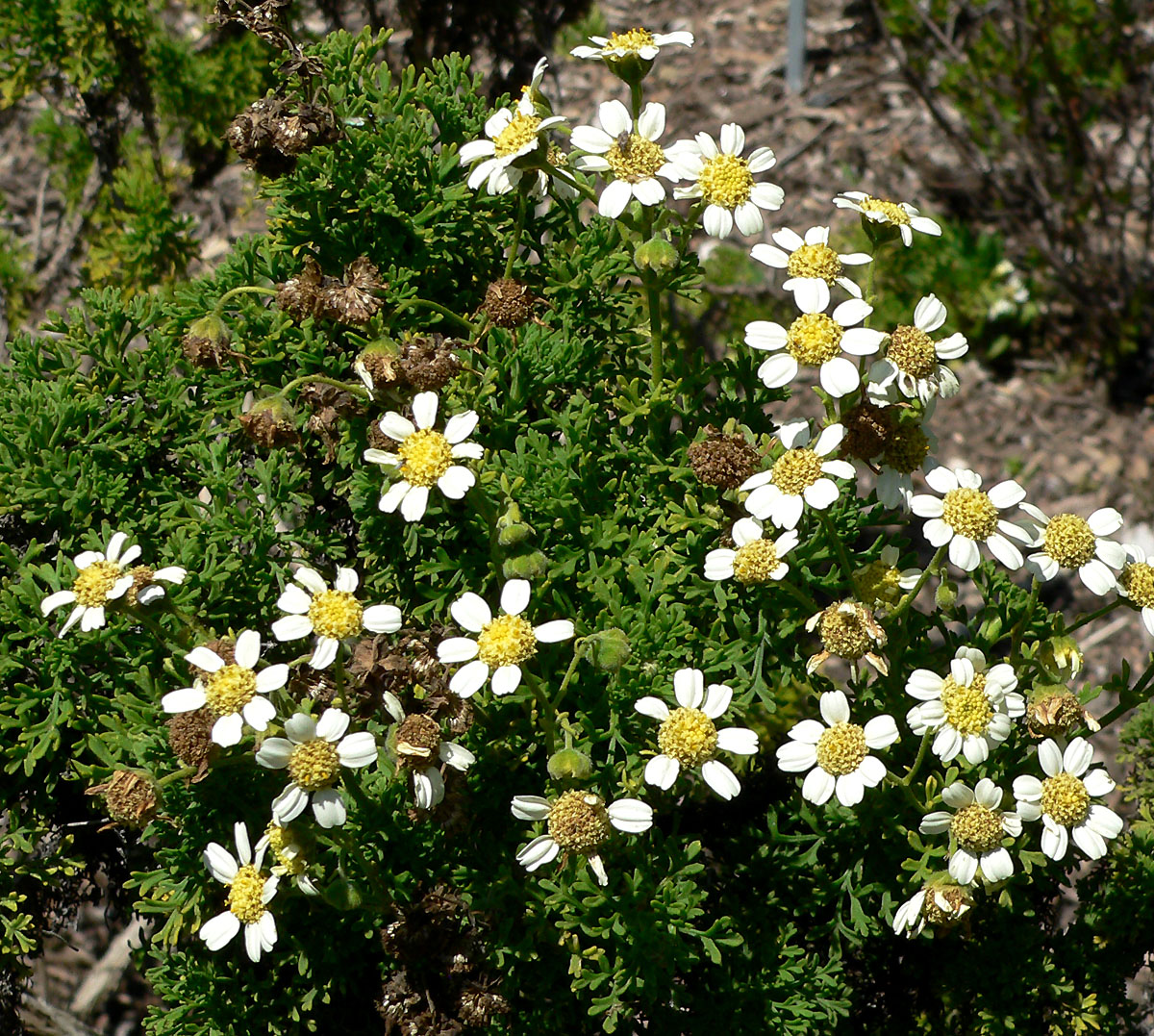
- Bahia ambrosioides

Scientific classification
- Kingdom: Plantae
- Clade: Tracheophytes
- Clade: Angiosperms
- Clade: Eudicots
- Clade: Asterids
- Order: Asterales
- Family: Asteraceae
- Subfamily: Asteroideae
- Tribe: Bahieae; B.G.Baldwin

= Bahieae =

Tribe of plants

Bahieae is a tribe of plants in the family Asteraceae, mostly native to North America and Mexico. It was described by Baldwin et al. in 2002.

== Taxonomy ==
Bahieae genera recognized by the Global Compositae Database as of April 2022:

- Achyropappus Kunth
- Apostates Lander
- Bahia Lag.
- Bartlettia A.Gray
- Chaetymenia Hook. & Arn.
- Chamaechaenactis Rydb.
- Espejoa DC.
- Florestina Cass.
- Holoschkuhria H.Rob.
- Hymenopappus L'Hér.
- Hymenothrix A.Gray
- Hypericophyllum Steetz
- Loxothysanus B.L.Rob.
- Nothoschkuhria B.G.Baldwin
- Palafoxia Lag.
- Peucephyllum A.Gray
- Picradeniopsis Rydb. ex Britton
- Platyschkuhria (A.Gray) Rydb.
- Psathyrotopsis Rydb.
- Schkuhria Roth
- Thymopsis Benth.
