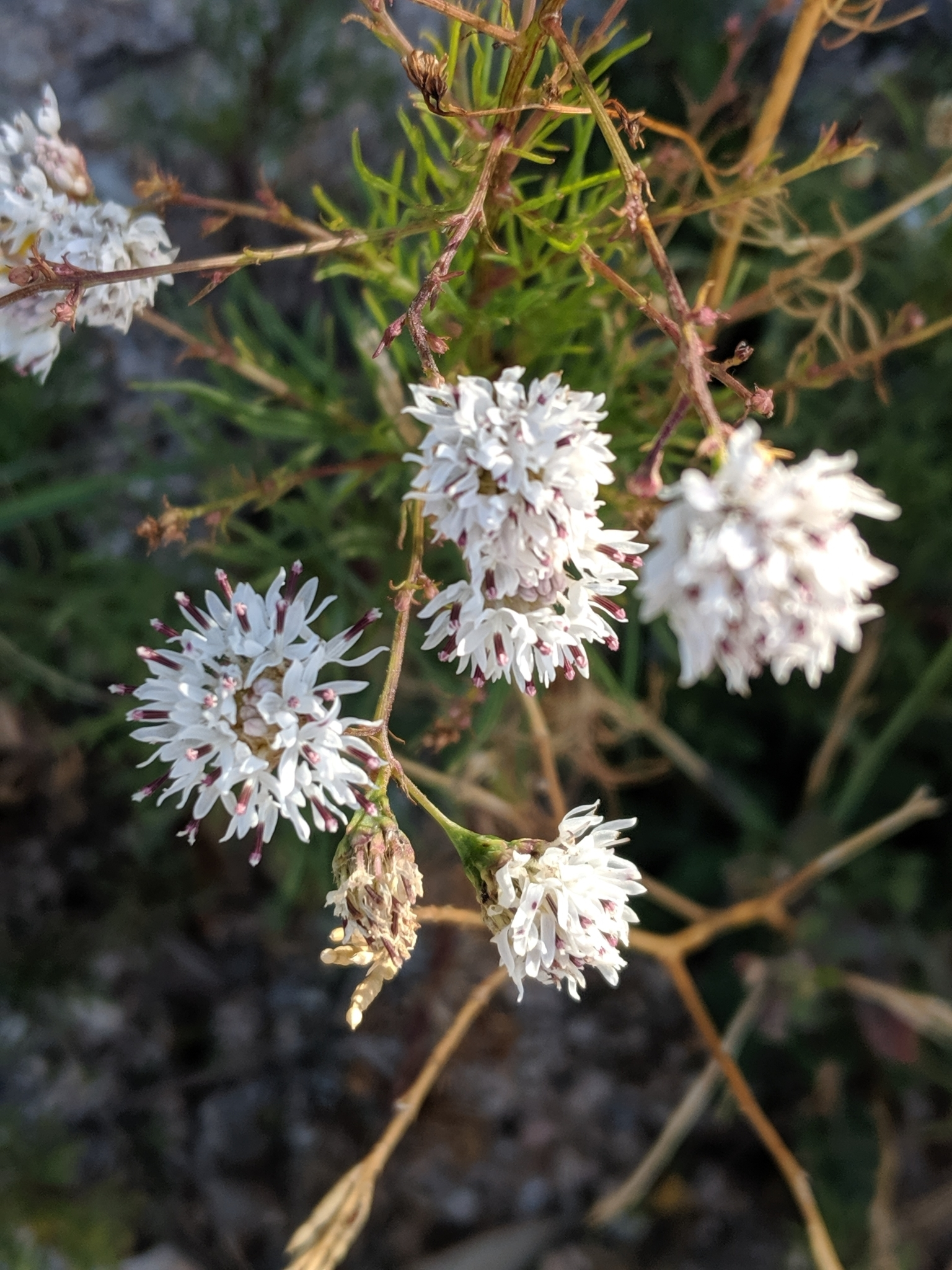

Scientific classification
- Kingdom: Plantae
- Clade: Tracheophytes
- Clade: Angiosperms
- Clade: Eudicots
- Clade: Asterids
- Order: Asterales
- Family: Asteraceae
- Genus: Hymenothrix
- Species: H. wrightii

Binomial name
- Hymenothrix wrightii A.Gray 1853

Synonyms
- Hymenopappus wrightii (A. Gray) H.M. Hall; Trichymenia wrightii (A. Gray) Rydb.

= Hymenothrix wrightii =

Species of flowering plant

Hymenothrix wrightii, commonly known as Wright's hymenothrix or Wright's thimblehead, is a North American species of flowering plant in the daisy family. It grows in northwestern Mexico (Sonora, Chihuahua, Baja California) and the southwestern United States (western Texas, Arizona, New Mexico, far southern California).

Hymenothrix wrightii is a perennial herb up to 60 cm (2 feet) tall. One plant produces 6-8 flower heads per stem, in a flat-topped array. Each head has 15-30 white, pink, or pale purple disc flowers but no ray flowers. The individual disc flowers are larger and showier than in many other species in the family.
