= Florestina =

Scientific classification
- Kingdom: Plantae
- Clade: Tracheophytes
- Clade: Angiosperms
- Clade: Eudicots
- Clade: Asterids
- Order: Asterales
- Family: Asteraceae
- Subfamily: Asteroideae
- Tribe: Bahieae
- Genus: Florestina; Cass.

Type species
- Florestina pedata (Cav.) Cass.

Genus of plants

Florestina is a genus of flowering plants in the sunflower family, native to Texas, Mexico, and Central America.

Florestina is distinguished from Palafoxia by its 3-5 lobed leaves, whitish corollas, and cypselae (achenes) which are only sparsely pubescent and with the trichomes curled (rather than straight). It is considered to be closely related to Palafoxia; some authors have suggested that the two genera should be merged.

Species

- Florestina latifolia (DC.) Rydb. - Mexico, Guatemala, Honduras, Nicaragua
- Florestina liebmannii Sch.Bip. ex Greenm. - Veracruz, Guerrero, Oaxaca
- Florestina lobata B.L.Turner - Guerrero, México State
- Florestina pedata (Cav.) Cass. - Mexico, Guatemala
- Florestina platyphylla (B.L.Rob. & Greenm.) B.L.Rob. & Greenm. - Chiapas, Oaxaca
- Florestina purpurea (Brandegee) Rydb. - Oaxaca, Puebla
- Florestina simplicifolia B.L.Turner - Oaxaca
- Florestina tripteris DC. - Texas, Chihuahua, Coahuila, Durango, Nuevo León, Tamaulipas, San Luis Potosí, Puebla, Guerrero, Oaxaca, Michoacán, México State
