= Hymenothrix palmeri =

Scientific classification
- Kingdom: Plantae
- Clade: Tracheophytes
- Clade: Angiosperms
- Clade: Eudicots
- Clade: Asterids
- Order: Asterales
- Family: Asteraceae
- Genus: Hymenothrix
- Species: H. palmeri

Binomial name
- Hymenothrix palmeri A.Gray 1886

Species of flowering plant

Hymenothrix palmeri is a North American species of flowering plant in the daisy family. It has been found only in the state of Chihuahua in northern Mexico.

Hymenothrix palmeri is an annual herb up to 40 cm (16 in) tall. Leaves are divided, with long narrow lobes. Each head has numerous yellow disc flowers but no ray flowers.
