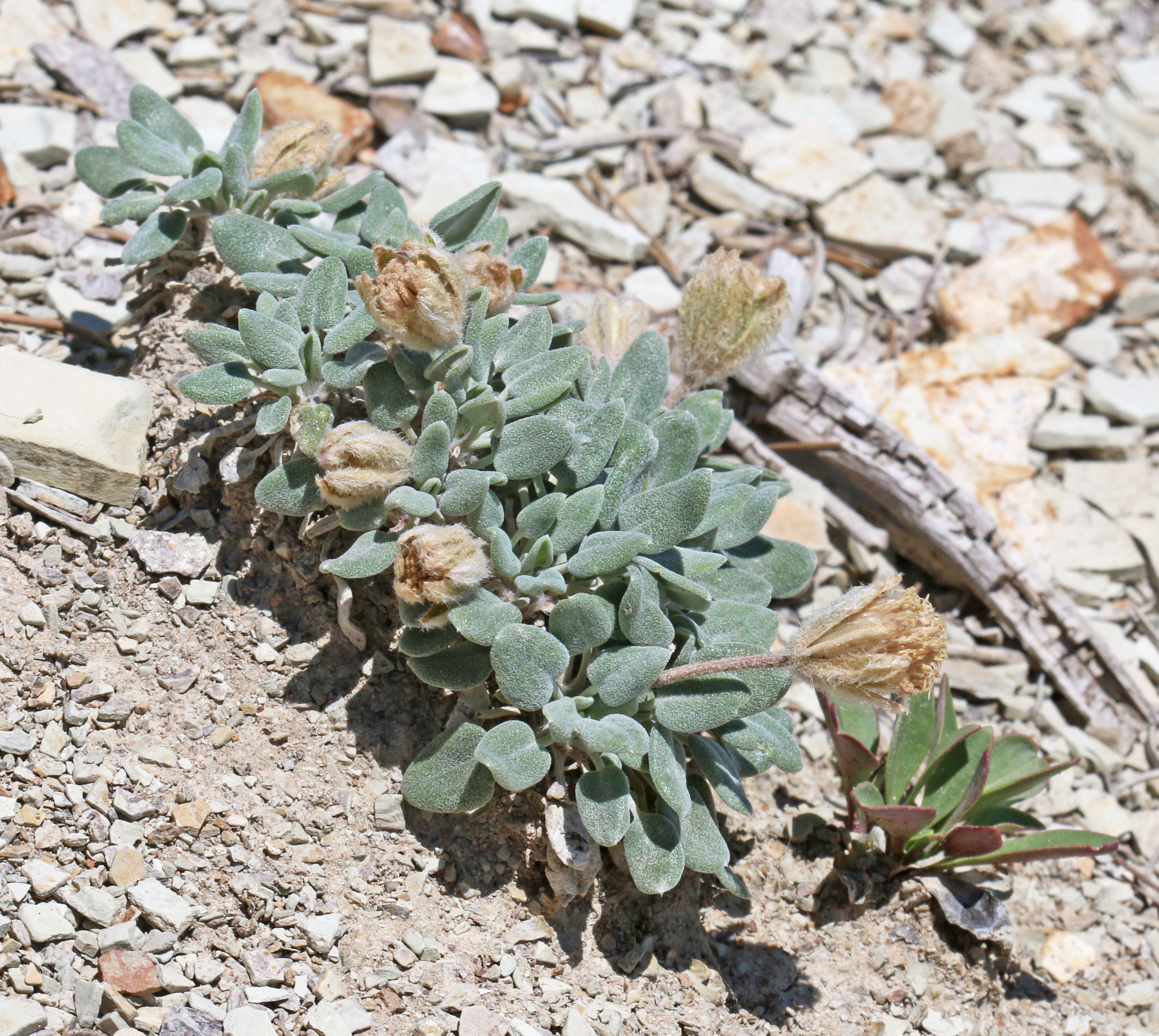

Conservation status
- Apparently Secure (NatureServe)

Scientific classification
- Kingdom: Plantae
- Clade: Embryophytes
- Clade: Tracheophytes
- Clade: Angiosperms
- Clade: Eudicots
- Clade: Asterids
- Order: Asterales
- Family: Asteraceae
- Subfamily: Asteroideae
- Tribe: Bahieae
- Genus: Chamaechaenactis; Rydb.
- Species: C. scaposa

Binomial name
- Chamaechaenactis scaposa (Eastw.) Rydb.

Synonyms
- Chaenactis scaposa Eastw.; Chamaechaenactis scaposa var. parva Preece & B.L.Turner; Actinella carnosa (Eastw.) A.Nelson

= Chamaechaenactis =

Genus of flowering plants

Chamaechaenactis, common name fullstem, is a genus of flowering plants in the daisy family.

There is only one known species, Chamaechaenactis scaposa, native to the western United States (Colorado, New Mexico, Texas, Wyoming, Arizona, Utah) It is a perennial up to 10 cm (4 inches) tall with a thick underground caudex. Most of the leaves are in a basal rosette. Flower heads are usually produced one at a time, with white to pink disc florets but no ray florets.
