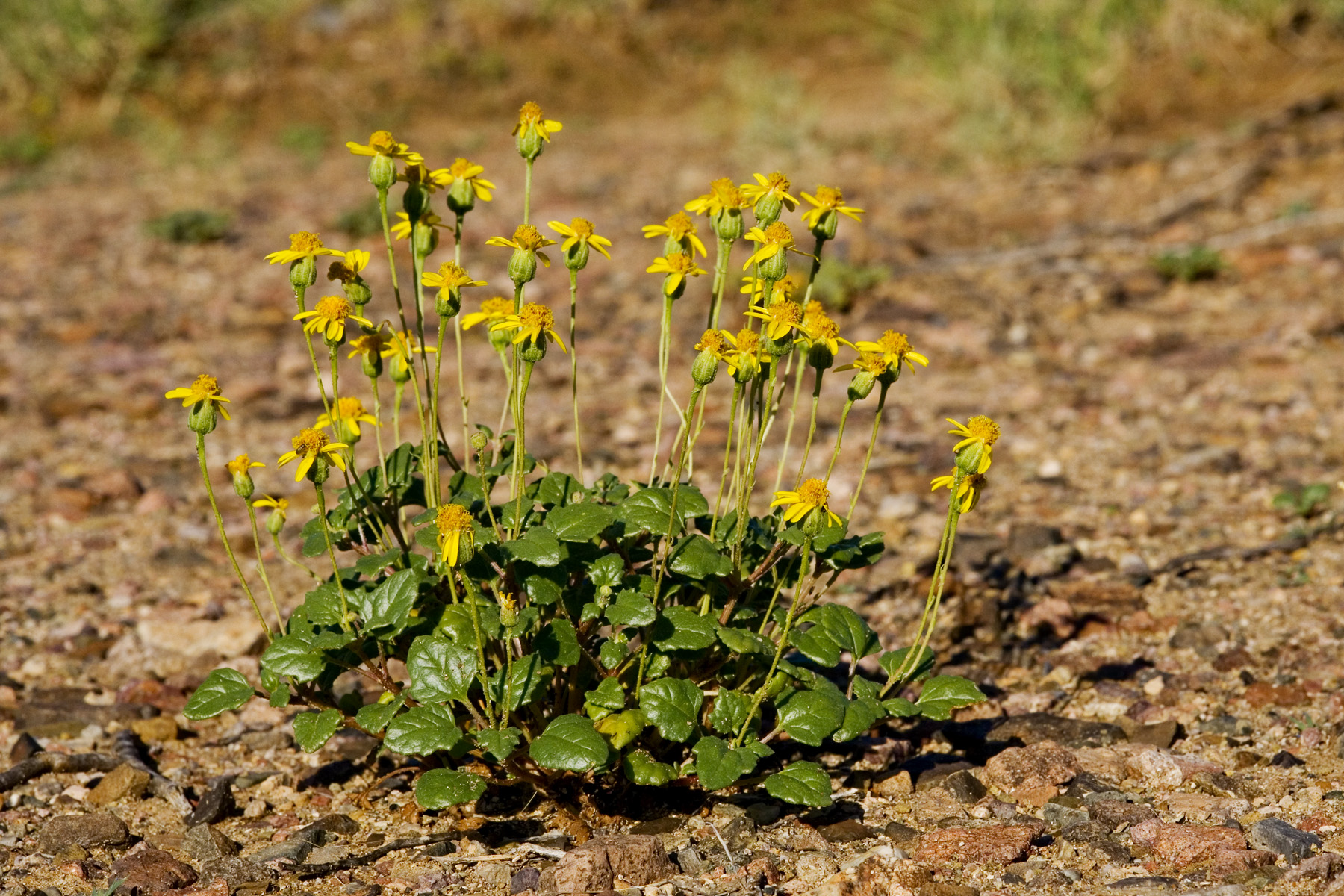
- Bartlettia scaposa

Conservation status
- Apparently Secure (NatureServe)

Scientific classification
- Kingdom: Plantae
- Clade: Tracheophytes
- Clade: Angiosperms
- Clade: Eudicots
- Clade: Asterids
- Order: Asterales
- Family: Asteraceae
- Subfamily: Asteroideae
- Tribe: Bahieae
- Genus: Bartlettia; A.Gray
- Species: B. scaposa

Binomial name
- Bartlettia scaposa A.Gray

= Bartlettia =

Genus of flowering plants

Bartlettia is a monotypic genus of flowering plants in the aster family, Asteraceae. It contains the single species Bartlettia scaposa, known commonly as the Bartlett daisy. It is native to Mexico and to New Mexico and Texas in the United States.

This species is an annual herb growing up to about 25 centimeters tall with upright stems branching at the base. Most of the leaves are near the bases of the stems. They have blades of various shapes, sometimes divided into three lobes, with serrated edges. The solitary flower head has 5 to 13 yellow ray florets and up to 90 yellow or purple-tinged disc florets. The fruit is a cypsela which may be over a centimeter long, including its pappus of bristles.

The plant grows on grasslands and playas. It flowers in summer and fall, especially after rain.
