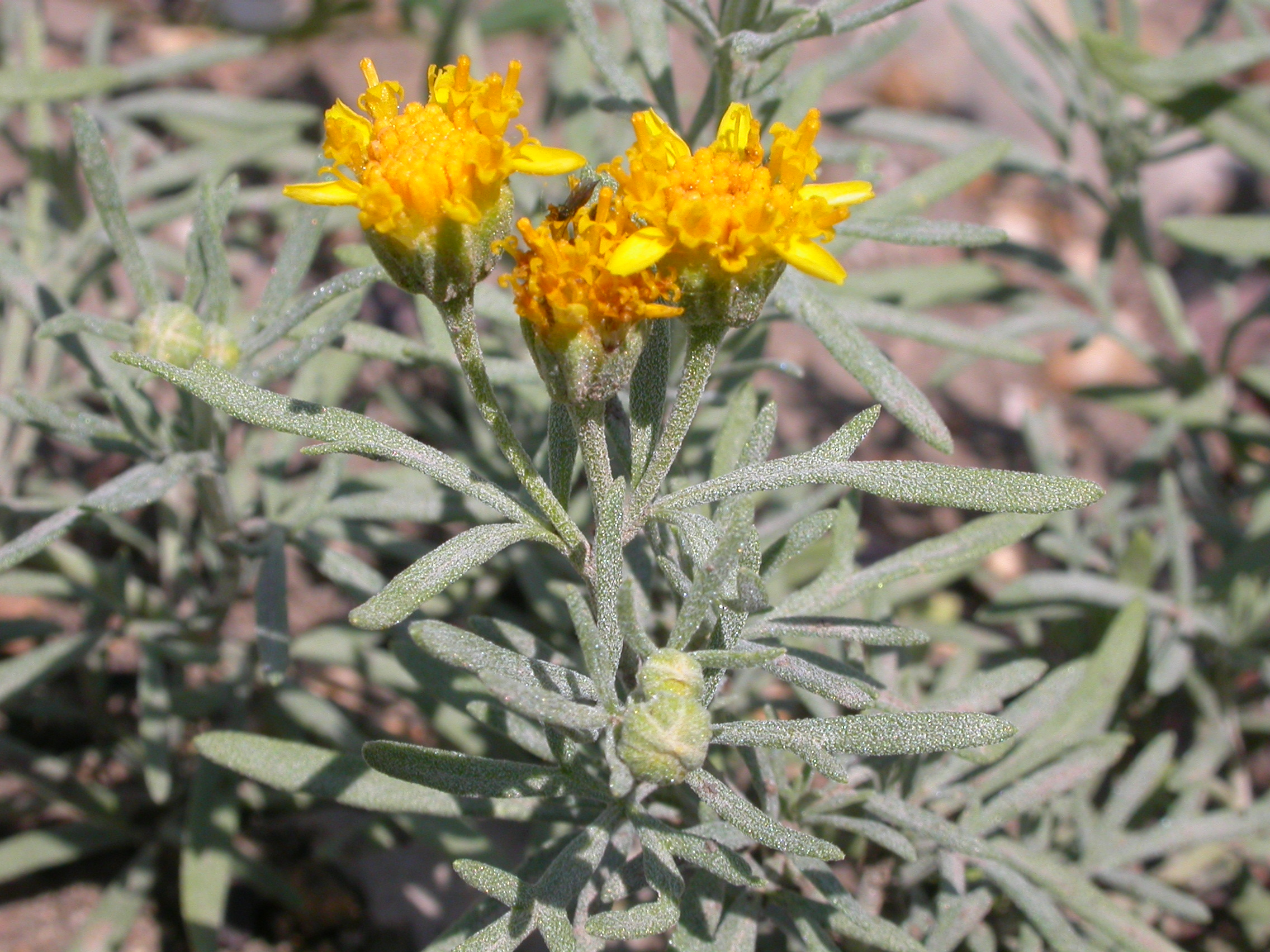
- Picradeniopsis oppositifolia

Scientific classification
- Kingdom: Plantae
- Clade: Tracheophytes
- Clade: Angiosperms
- Clade: Eudicots
- Clade: Asterids
- Order: Asterales
- Family: Asteraceae
- Subfamily: Asteroideae
- Tribe: Bahieae
- Genus: Picradeniopsis; Rydb.

Synonyms
- Cephalobembix Rydb.

= Picradeniopsis =

Genus of flowering plants

Picradeniopsis, the false bahias, is a genus of flowering plants in the daisy family. It includes eight species native to the Americas, ranging from the central and southeastern United States to southern Mexico, and from Peru to northwestern Argentina and Uruguay.

== Species ==
The following 8 species are accepted.

- Picradeniopsis absinthifolia (Benth.) B.G.Baldwin
- Picradeniopsis bigelovii (A.Gray) B.G.Baldwin
- Picradeniopsis multiflora (Hook. & Arn.) B.G.Baldwin
- Picradeniopsis oppositifolia (Nutt.) Rydb.
- Picradeniopsis pringlei (Greenm.) B.G.Baldwin
- Picradeniopsis schaffneri (S.Watson) B.G.Baldwin
- Picradeniopsis woodhousei (A.Gray) Rydb.
- Picradeniopsis xylopoda (Greenm.) B.G.Baldwin
