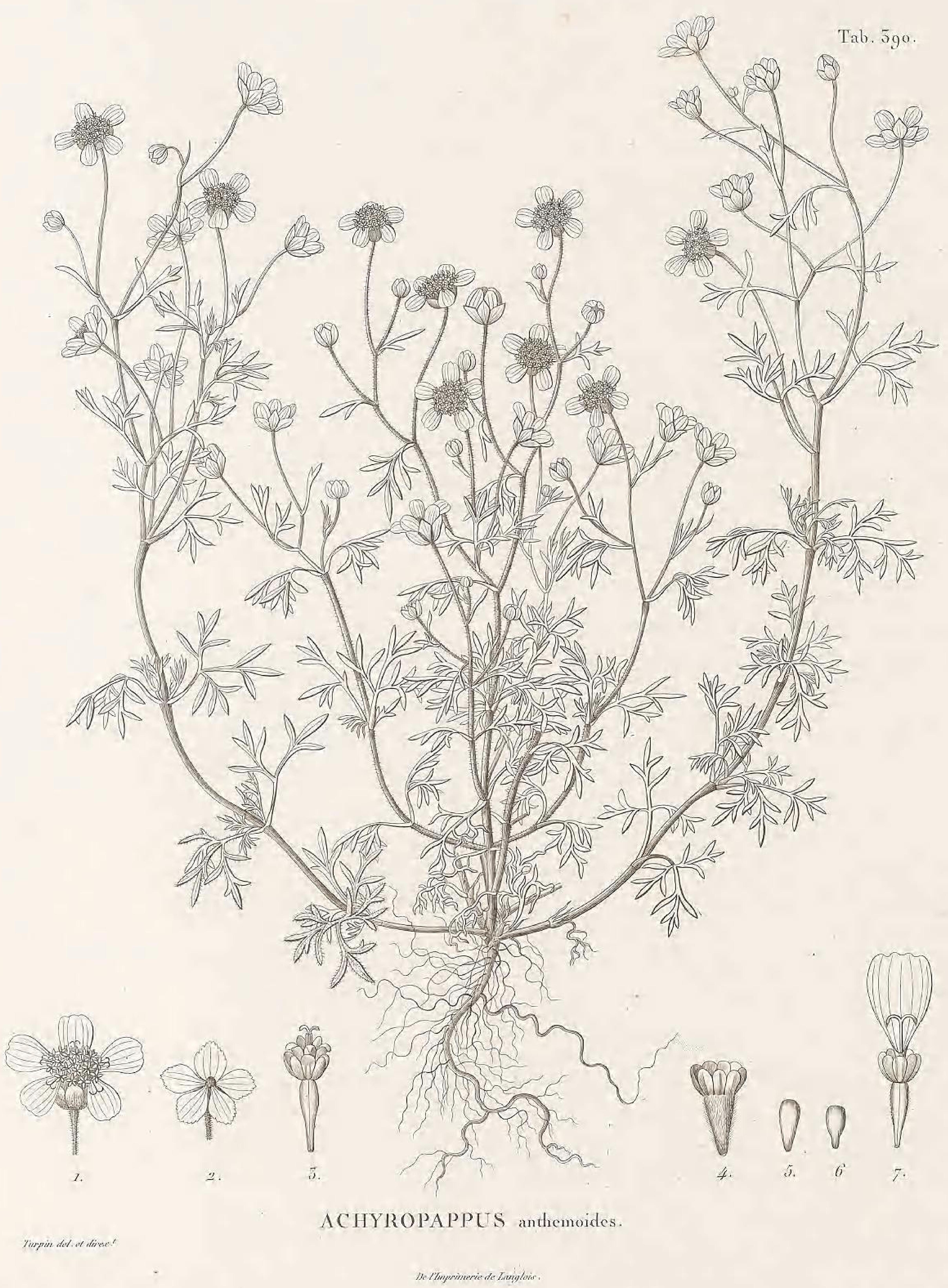
- Drawing from the protologue of Achyropappus

Scientific classification
- Kingdom: Plantae
- Clade: Tracheophytes
- Clade: Angiosperms
- Clade: Eudicots
- Clade: Asterids
- Order: Asterales
- Family: Asteraceae
- Subfamily: Asteroideae
- Tribe: Bahieae
- Genus: Achyropappus; Kunth

Species
- See text.

= Achyropappus =

Genus of flowering plants

Achyropappus is a genus of flowering plants in the daisy family described as a genus in 1820.

== Species ==
As of May 2023, Plants of the World Online accepted three species:

- Achyropappus anthemoides Kunth
- Achyropappus depauperatus (S.F.Blake) B.L.Turner
- Achyropappus queretarensis B.L.Turner
