= Psathyrotopsis =

Scientific classification
- Kingdom: Plantae
- Clade: Tracheophytes
- Clade: Angiosperms
- Clade: Eudicots
- Clade: Asterids
- Order: Asterales
- Family: Asteraceae
- Subfamily: Asteroideae
- Tribe: Bahieae
- Genus: Psathyrotopsis; Rydb.

Type species
- Psathyrotes purpusii Brandegee

Genus of plants

Psathyrotopsis is a genus of North American plants in the tribe Bahieae within the family Asteraceae.

Species

- Psathyrotopsis hintoniorum B.L.Turner - Coahuila
- Psathyrotopsis purpusii (Brandegee) Rydb. - Coahuila
- Psathyrotopsis scaposa (A.Gray) H.Rob. - Chihuahua, Texas, New Mexico
