= Loxothysanus =

Scientific classification
- Kingdom: Plantae
- Clade: Tracheophytes
- Clade: Angiosperms
- Clade: Eudicots
- Clade: Asterids
- Order: Asterales
- Family: Asteraceae
- Subfamily: Asteroideae
- Tribe: Bahieae
- Genus: Loxothysanus; B.L.Rob.

Type species
- Loxothysanus sinuatus (Less.) B.L.Rob.

Genus of flowering plants

Loxothysanus is a genus of Mexican flowering plants in the daisy family.

Species

- Loxothysanus pedunculatus Rydb. - San Luis Potosi, Hidalgo
- Loxothysanus sinuatus (Less.) B.L.Rob. - Chiapas, Veracruz, San Luis Potosi, Oaxaca, Hidalgo, Puebla, Tamaulipas
