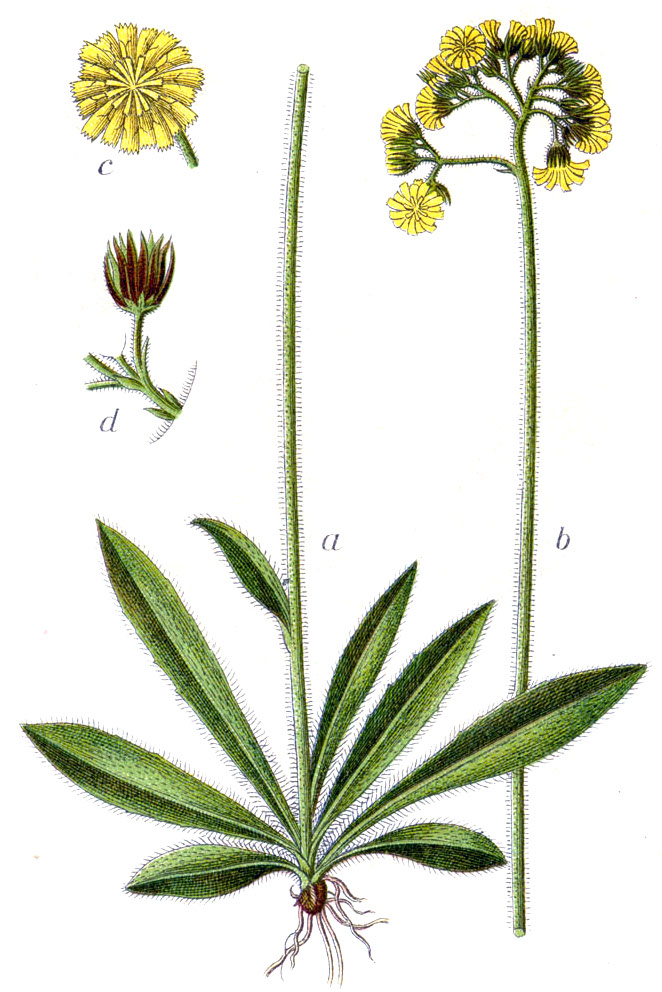

Scientific classification
- Kingdom: Plantae
- Clade: Tracheophytes
- Clade: Angiosperms
- Clade: Eudicots
- Clade: Asterids
- Order: Asterales
- Family: Asteraceae
- Genus: Hieracium
- Species: H. cymosum

Binomial name
- Hieracium cymosum (L.)

Synonyms
- Pilosella cymosa (L.) F. W. Schultz & Sch. Bip.

= Hieracium cymosum =

Species of flowering plant

Hieracium cymosum is a species of plant from family Asteraceae found everywhere throughout Europe (except for Iceland, Ireland, Great Britain, Portugal, Russia, and Spain).
