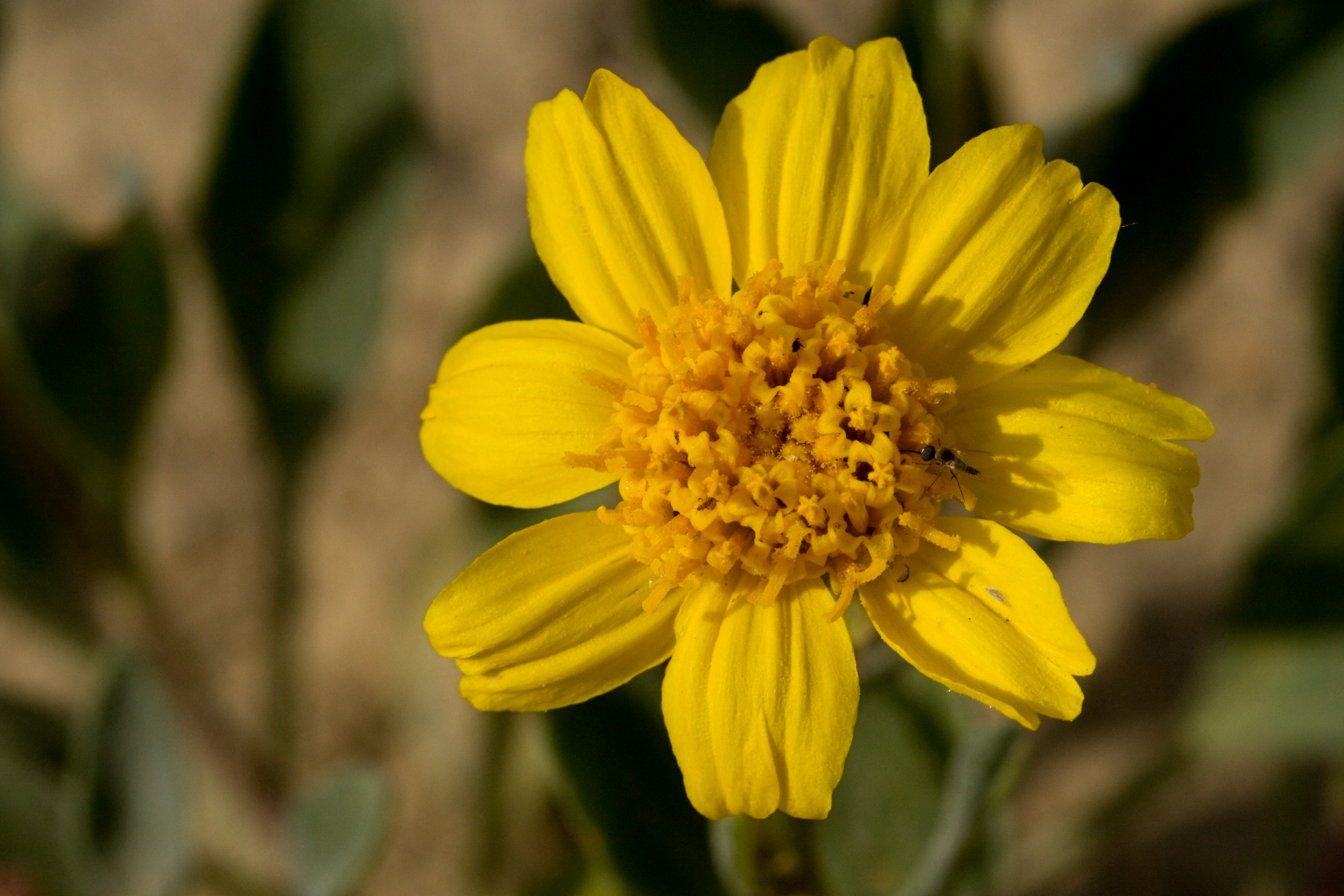
- Platyschkuhria integrifolia var. oblongifolia

Scientific classification
- Kingdom: Plantae
- Clade: Tracheophytes
- Clade: Angiosperms
- Clade: Eudicots
- Clade: Asterids
- Order: Asterales
- Family: Asteraceae
- Subfamily: Asteroideae
- Tribe: Bahieae
- Genus: Platyschkuhria; Rydb.
- Species: P. integrifolia

Binomial name
- Platyschkuhria integrifolia (A.Gray) Rydb.

Synonyms
- Synonymy: Schkuhria sect. Platyschkuhria A.Gray; Bahia sect. Platyschkuhria A.Gray; Bahia desertorum M.E.Jones; Bahia integrifolia (A.Gray) J.F.Macbr.; Bahia integrifolia var. ourolepis (S.F.Blake) W.L.Ellison; Bahia nudicaulis A.Gray; Bahia nudicaulis var. desertorum (M.E.Jones) Cronquist; Bahia nudicaulis var. oblongifolia (A.Gray) Cronquist; Bahia nudicaulis var. ourolepis (S.F.Blake) Cronquist; Bahia oblongifolia A.Gray; Bahia ourolepis S.F.Blake; Eriophyllum nudicaule Kuntze; Eriophyllum oblongifolium Kuntze; Platyschkuhria desertorum Rydb.; Platyschkuhria integrifolia var. desertorum (M.E.Jones) W.L.Ellison; Platyschkuhria integrifolia var. oblongifolia (A.Gray) W.L.Ellison; Platyschkuhria integrifolia var. ourolepis (S.F.Blake) W.L.Ellison; Platyschkuhria nudicaulis (M.E.Jones) Rydb.; Platyschkuhria oblongifolia Rydb.; Platyschkuhria ourolepis (S.F.Blake) W.L.Ellison; Schkuhria integrifolia A.Gray (1874) (basionym); Schkuhria integrifolia var. oblongifolia A.Gray

= Platyschkuhria =

Genus of plants

Platyschkuhria is a genus of North American flowering plants in the daisy family. It contains a single species, Platyschkuhria integrifolia, the basindaisy. It is native to the Colorado Plateau and Canyonlands region of Arizona, Colorado, New Mexico, Montana (Carbon County), Utah, and Wyoming in the western United States.

It grows in clay soils in desert shrub, pinyon juniper woodland, and mountain brush communities.
