= Nothoschkuhria =

Scientific classification
- Kingdom: Plantae
- Clade: Tracheophytes
- Clade: Angiosperms
- Clade: Eudicots
- Clade: Asterids
- Order: Asterales
- Family: Asteraceae
- Subfamily: Asteroideae
- Tribe: Bahieae
- Genus: Nothoschkuhria; B.G.Baldwin
- Species: N. degenerica

Binomial name
- Nothoschkuhria degenerica (Kuntze) B.G.Baldwin

Synonyms
- Rothia degenerica Kuntze; Schkuhria degenerica R.E.Fr.; Schkuhria oolepis Sch.Bip.

Genus of flowering plants

Nothoschkuhria is a genus of flowering plants in the family Asteraceae. It includes a single species, Nothoschkuhria degenerica, which is native to Bolivia and Jujuy Province of northwestern Argentina.

The species was first described as Rothia degenerica by Otto Kuntze in 1898. In 2016 Bruce Gregg Baldwin placed the species in the new monotypic genus Nothoschkuhria as Nothoschkuhria degenerica.
