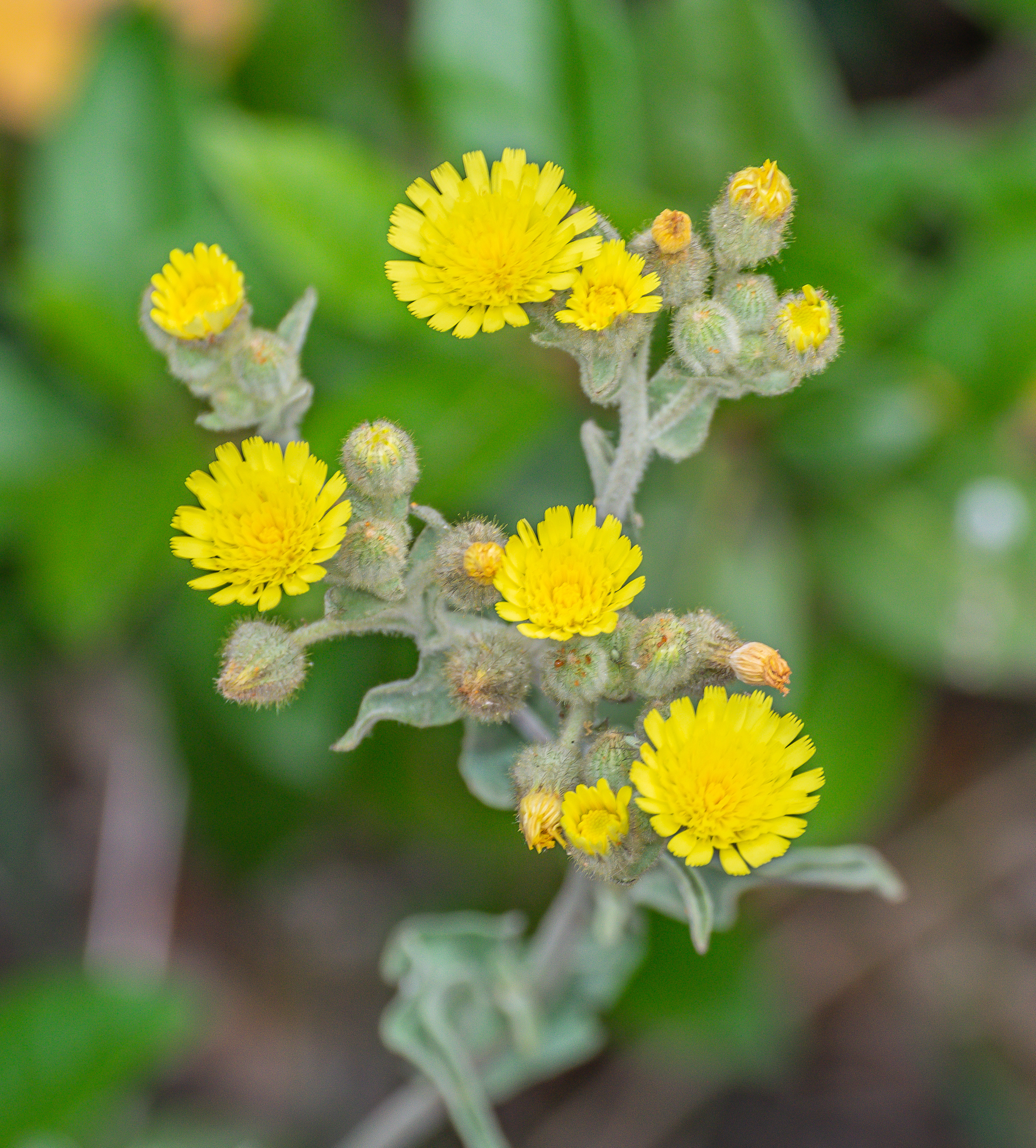

Scientific classification
- Kingdom: Plantae
- Clade: Embryophytes
- Clade: Tracheophytes
- Clade: Angiosperms
- Clade: Eudicots
- Clade: Asterids
- Order: Asterales
- Family: Asteraceae
- Genus: Andryala
- Species: A. integrifolia

Binomial name
- Andryala integrifolia L.

Synonyms
- Andryala allochroa Hoffmanns. & Link; Andryala ampelusia Maire; Andryala cedretorum Maire; Andryala corymbosa Lam.; Andryala diffusa Jan ex DC.; Andryala dissecta Hoffmanns. & Link; Andryala gracilis Pau; Andryala humilis Font Quer; Andryala integrifolia var. ampelusia (Maire) Dobignard; Andryala integrifolia var. cedretorum (Maire) Dobignard; Andryala integrifolia subsp. perennans Maire & Weiller; Andryala lanata Vill.; Andryala minuta Lojac.; Andryala mollis Asso; Andryala parviflora Lam.; Andryala reboudiana Pomel; Andryala runcinata Pers.; Andryala sinuata L.; Andryala undulata C.Presl; Andryala uniflora Schrank; Crepis incana Lapeyr.; Hieracium andryala E.H.L.Krause; Rothia cheiranthifolia Roth; Rothia lanata Bubani; Rothia runcinata Roth

= Andryala integrifolia =

Species of flowering plant

Andryala integrifolia, also known as common Andryala, is a species of flowering plant in the family Asteraceae.
