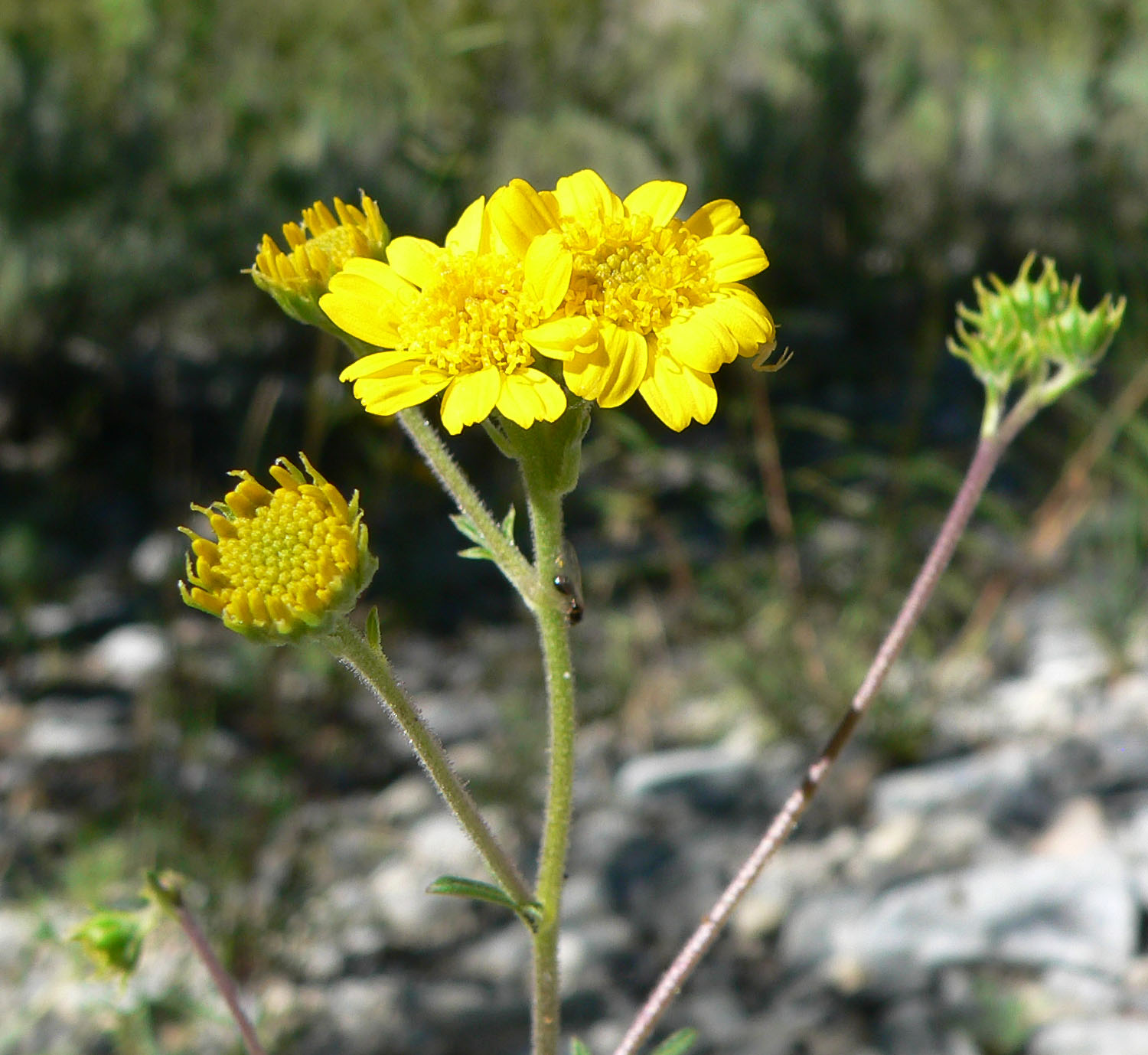
- Hymenothrix dissecta

Scientific classification
- Kingdom: Plantae
- Clade: Tracheophytes
- Clade: Angiosperms
- Clade: Eudicots
- Clade: Asterids
- Order: Asterales
- Family: Asteraceae
- Subfamily: Asteroideae
- Tribe: Bahieae
- Genus: Hymenothrix; Gray

Synonyms
- Amauriopsis Rydb.; Hutchinsonia M.E.Jones 1933, illegitimate homonym not Robyns 1928 (Rubiaceae); Trichymenia Rydb.

= Hymenothrix =

Genus of flowering plants

Hymenothrix is a small genus of North American flowering plants in the daisy family known as thimbleheads. They are native to the southwestern United States and northern Mexico.

These are spindly, erect annual, biennial, and perennial herbs with white or yellow flowers.

Species

The following species are recognised in the genus Hymenothrix:

- Hymenothrix autumnalis - Coahuila, Nuevo León
- Hymenothrix biternata - United States (Arizona New Mexico)
- Hymenothrix dissecta - Baja California, Sonora, Chihuahua, Coahuila, United States (California Arizona New Mexico Texas Nevada Utah Colorado Wyoming South Dakota)
- Hymenothrix glandulopubescens
- Hymenothrix greenmanii - México State
- Hymenothrix janakosiana - Chihuahua
- Hymenothrix loomisii - Loomis's thimblehead - California Nevada Arizona
- Hymenothrix palmeri - Chihuahua
- Hymenothrix pedata - Chihuahua, Coahuila, United States (New Mexico Texas)
- Hymenothrix wislizeni - Trans-Pecos thimblehead - Chihuahua, Sonora, Arizona New Mexico Texas
- Hymenothrix wrightii - Wright's thimblehead - Chihuahua, Baja California, California, Arizona, New Mexico and Texas

formerly included

Hymenothrix purpurea Brandegee - Florestina purpurea (Brandegee) Rydb.
