= Picradeniopsis bigelovii =

Scientific classification
- Kingdom: Plantae
- Clade: Tracheophytes
- Clade: Angiosperms
- Clade: Eudicots
- Clade: Asterids
- Order: Asterales
- Family: Asteraceae
- Genus: Picradeniopsis
- Species: P. bigelovii

Binomial name
- Picradeniopsis bigelovii (A.Gray) B.G.Baldwin

Synonyms
- Bahia bigelovii A.Gray; Eriophyllum bigelowii (A.Gray) Kuntze; Schkuhria bigelovii A.Gray

Species of flowering plant

Picradeniopsis bigelovii, or Bigelow's bahia, is a North American species of flowering plants in the family Asteraceae. It is native to the State of Coahuila in Mexico and to the western (trans-Pecos) part of the US state of Texas.

Picradeniopsis bigelovii is an annual reaching a height of 30 cm (12 inches). It has yellow flower heads with both ray florets and disc florets. The species grows on sandy soils.
