= Thymopsis (plant) =

Scientific classification
- Kingdom: Plantae
- Clade: Tracheophytes
- Clade: Angiosperms
- Clade: Eudicots
- Clade: Asterids
- Order: Asterales
- Family: Asteraceae
- Subfamily: Asteroideae
- Tribe: Bahieae
- Genus: Thymopsis; Benth. 1873, conserved name not Jaub. & Spach 1842 (Clusiaceae)

Type species
- Thymopsis wrightii (syn of T. thymoides) Benth.

Synonyms
- Neothymopsis Britton & Millsp.

Genus of plants

Thymopsis is a genus of flowering plants in the bahia tribe within the daisy family.

Species

- Thymopsis brittonii Greenm. - Bahamas
- Thymopsis thymoides (Griseb.) Urb. - Cuba
