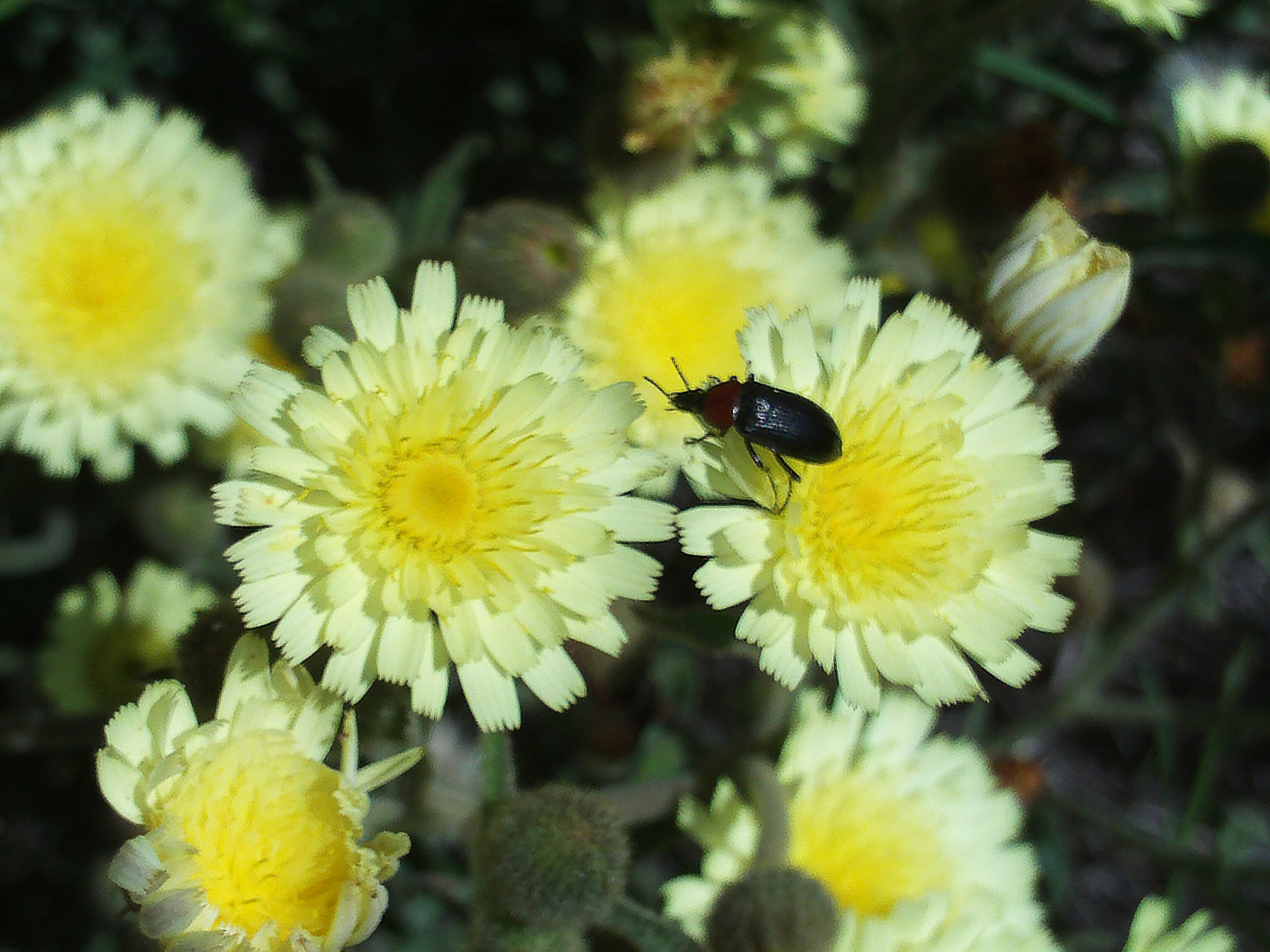
- Andryala laxiflora

Scientific classification
- Kingdom: Plantae
- Clade: Embryophytes
- Clade: Tracheophytes
- Clade: Angiosperms
- Clade: Eudicots
- Clade: Asterids
- Order: Asterales
- Family: Asteraceae
- Subfamily: Cichorioideae
- Tribe: Cichorieae
- Subtribe: Hieraciinae
- Genus: Andryala; L.

Type species
- Andryala integrifolia L.

Synonyms
- Rothia Schreb. 1971, rejected name, not Lam. 1792 (Asteraceae) nor Borkh. 1792 (Poaceae) nor Pers.. 1807 (Fabaceae); Forneum Adans.; Paua Caball.; Pietrosia Nyár. ex Sennikov; Eriophorus Vaill. ex DC.; Pietrosia Nyár.

= Andryala =

Genus of flowering plants

Andryala is a genus of flowering plants in the family Asteraceae. It is native to Europe, North Africa, and the Middle East.

Accepted species

- A. aestivalis Pomel
- A. agardhii Haensel. ex DC.
- A. ampelusia Maire
- A. arenaria Boiss. & Reut.
- A. atlanticola H.Lindb.
- A. brievaensis García Adá
- A. caballeroi Font Quer
- A. cedretorum Maire
- A. chevallieri Barratti ex L.Chevall.
- A. cossyrensis Guss.
- A. crithmifolia Aiton
- A. dichroa Maire
- A. dissecta Hoffmanns. & Link
- A. faurei Maire
- A. floccosa Pomel
- A. glandulosa Lam.
- A. integrifolia L.
- A. laevitomentosa (Nyár. ex Sennikov) Greuter
- A. laxiflora DC.
- A. maroccana Pau ex Caball.
- A. nemausensis Vill.
- A. nigricans Poir.
- A. pinnatifida Aiton
- A. ragusina L.
- A. robusta Lowe
- A. rothia Pers.
- A. serotina Porta
- A. spartioides (Batt.) Bonnet & Barratte
- A. tenuifolia DC.
- A. tomentosa Chaix
- A. webbii Christ
