= Capperia hellenica =

Scientific classification
- Domain: Eukaryota
- Kingdom: Animalia
- Phylum: Arthropoda
- Class: Insecta
- Order: Lepidoptera
- Family: Pterophoridae
- Genus: Capperia
- Species: C. hellenica

Binomial name
- Capperia hellenica Adamczewski, 1951

Species of plume moth

Capperia hellenica is a moth of the family Pterophoridae. It is found in Spain, France, Italy, Croatia, Bosnia and Herzegovina, North Macedonia and Greece. It has also been recorded from Malta and Asia Minor.

The wingspan is 10–14 mm. Adults are on wing from July to September.

The larvae feed on stiff hedgenettle (Stachys recta).
