= Capperia maratonica =

Scientific classification
- Domain: Eukaryota
- Kingdom: Animalia
- Phylum: Arthropoda
- Class: Insecta
- Order: Lepidoptera
- Family: Pterophoridae
- Genus: Capperia
- Species: C. maratonica

Binomial name
- Capperia maratonica Adamczewski, 1951

Species of plume moth

Capperia maratonica is a moth of the family Pterophoridae. It is found in Spain, France, Italy, Sardinia, Croatia, Serbia and Montenegro, Bulgaria, Romania, Ukraine, North Macedonia, Greece and Cyprus. It has also been recorded from the Palestinian Territories.

The wingspan is about 14 mm. There are two generations per year.

The larvae feed on Teucrium scordium.
