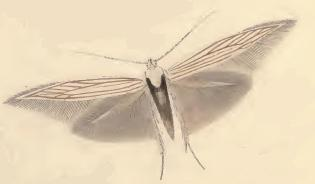

Scientific classification
- Kingdom: Animalia
- Phylum: Arthropoda
- Class: Insecta
- Order: Lepidoptera
- Family: Coleophoridae
- Genus: Coleophora
- Species: C. auricella

Binomial name
- Coleophora auricella (Fabricius, 1794)

Synonyms
- Tinea auricella Fabricius, 1794; Coleophora paucinotella Toll, 1961; Longibacillia suceavella Nemes, 2003; Coleophora danilae Nemes, 2004

= Coleophora auricella =

Species of moth

Coleophora auricella is a moth of the family Coleophoridae. It is found from Germany and Poland to Spain, Italy and Romania. It has also been recorded from southern Russia.

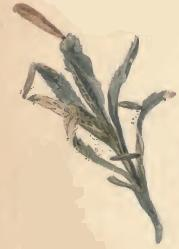
Sprig of Stachys recta with mined leaves and several larva-cases attached

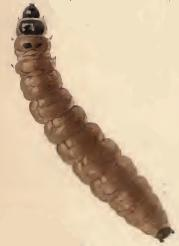
Larva

The larvae feed on Sideritis endressii, Stachys alopecuros, Stachys officinalis, Stachys recta, Teucrium chamaedrys and Teucrium scorodonia. Larvae can be found from autumn to June.
