= Phyllonorycter monspessulanella =

Scientific classification
- Domain: Eukaryota
- Kingdom: Animalia
- Phylum: Arthropoda
- Class: Insecta
- Order: Lepidoptera
- Family: Gracillariidae
- Genus: Phyllonorycter
- Species: P. monspessulanella

Binomial name
- Phyllonorycter monspessulanella (Fuchs, 1897)

Synonyms
- Lithocolletis monspessulanella Fuchs, 1897

Species of moth

Phyllonorycter monspessulanella is a moth of the family Gracillariidae. It is known from Germany, France, Italy, Croatia and Portugal.

The larvae feed on Acer campestre and Acer monspessulanum species. They mine the leaves of their host plant.
