= Coleophora trigeminella =

Scientific classification
- Kingdom: Animalia
- Phylum: Arthropoda
- Class: Insecta
- Order: Lepidoptera
- Family: Coleophoridae
- Genus: Coleophora
- Species: C. trigeminella

Binomial name
- Coleophora trigeminella Fuchs, 1881

Species of moth

Coleophora trigeminella is a moth of the family Coleophoridae. It is found in most of Europe, except Ireland, the Balkan Peninsula and the Mediterranean islands.

The larvae feed on snowy mespilus (Amelanchier ovalis), Cotoneaster, midland hawthorn (Crataegus laevigata), common hawthorn (Crataegus monogyna), European crab apple (Malus sylvestris), wild cherry (Prunus avium), blackthorn (Prunus spinosa), common whitebeam (Sorbus aria) and rowan (Sorbus aucuparia).
