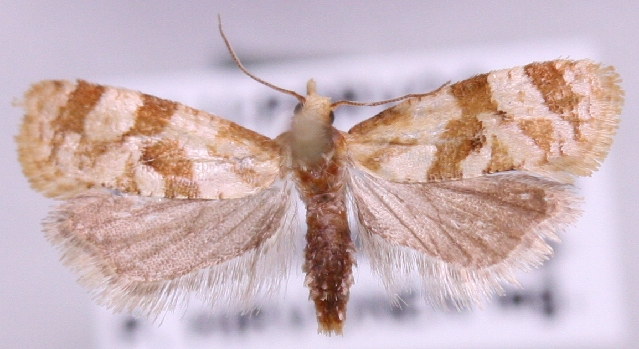

Scientific classification
- Domain: Eukaryota
- Kingdom: Animalia
- Phylum: Arthropoda
- Class: Insecta
- Order: Lepidoptera
- Family: Tortricidae
- Genus: Gynnidomorpha
- Species: G. luridana

Binomial name
- Gynnidomorpha luridana (Gregson, 1870)

Synonyms
- Argyrolepia luridana Gregson, 1870; Phalonia luridana; Piercea luridana

= Gynnidomorpha luridana =

Species of moth

Gynnidomorpha luridana is a species of moth of the family Tortricidae first described by Charles Stuart Gregson in 1870. It is found in China (Heilongjiang, Henan, Jilin, Liaoning), Japan, Korea, Turkey, Russia and Europe, where it has been recorded from Great Britain, Belgium, France, Austria, Spain, Germany, Denmark, Finland, Sweden, Estonia, Latvia, Hungary, Romania and Corsica. The habitat consists of dry pastures, farmland and downland.

The wingspan is 9–11 mm.

The larvae feed on Matricaria species.
