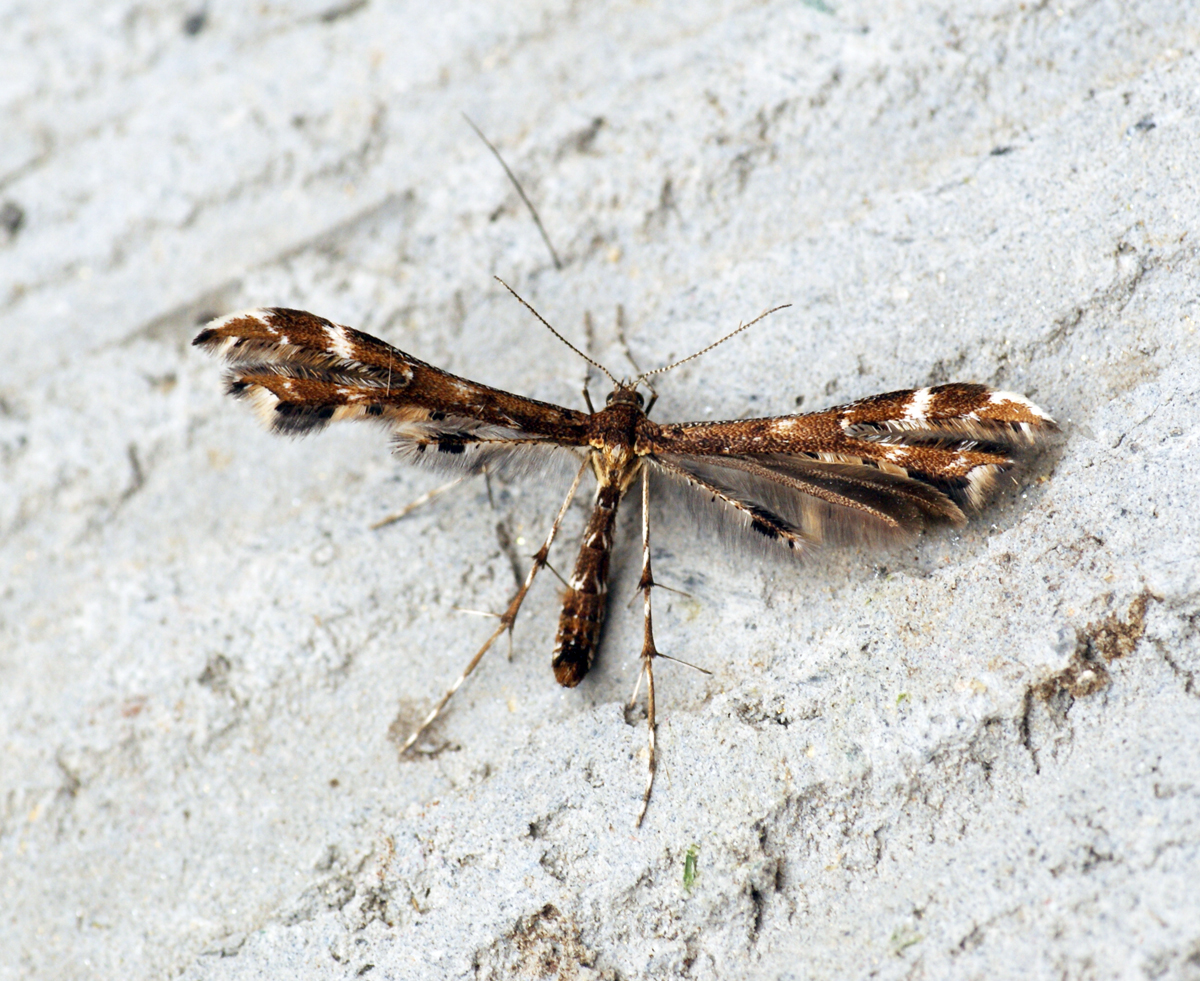

Scientific classification
- Kingdom: Animalia
- Phylum: Arthropoda
- Clade: Pancrustacea
- Class: Insecta
- Order: Lepidoptera
- Family: Pterophoridae
- Genus: Capperia
- Species: C. britanniodactylus

Binomial name
- Capperia britanniodactylus (Gregson, 1869)

Synonyms
- Capperia britanniodactyla; Oxyptilus britanniodactylus Gregson, 1869; Pterophorus teucrii Jordan, 1869

= Capperia britanniodactylus =

Species of plume moth

Capperia britanniodactylus, also known as the wood sage plume, is a moth of the family Pterophoridae, found in Europe. It was first described by Charles Stuart Gregson in 1869.

== Description ==
The wingspan is 18–21 mm. Adults are on wing from May to August. The forewings are dark reddish-fuscous, with a few white scales and indistinct whitish spots at 1/3 of disc and at the base of the first segment. There are two well-marked white bars on the segments. The cilia are mixed with black scales, banded with whitish. The hindwings are dark fuscous, the third segment with two subapical black scale-teeth in the upper cilia and suboblong subapical and small apical scale-teeth in the dorsal cilia, separated by whitish spots. The larva is pale greyish-green with darker green dorsal and subdorsal lines and brown spots and numerous whitish hairs.

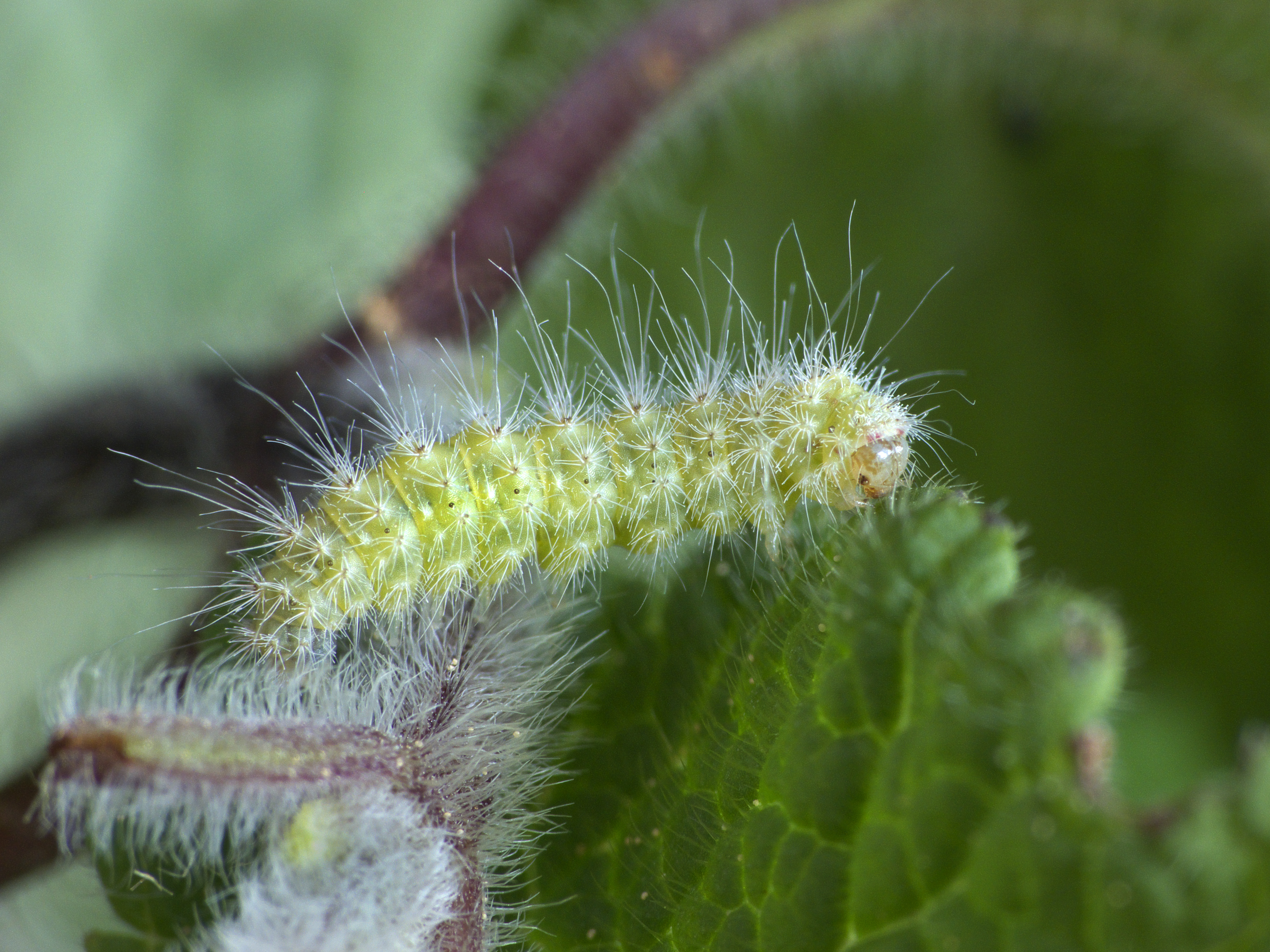
larva

The larvae feed on the stem of wood sage (Teucrium scorodonia), just below some leaves which soon wither. The larvae then continue living underneath the withered leaves with pupation taking place on the stem under the withered part, or under a leaf, or on adjacent foliage.

== Distribution ==
The wood sage plume is found in western Europe, from Ireland and Spain to Norway, Germany and Italy. It has also been recorded from Romania and Bulgaria.
