= Capperia marginellus =

Scientific classification
- Domain: Eukaryota
- Kingdom: Animalia
- Phylum: Arthropoda
- Class: Insecta
- Order: Lepidoptera
- Family: Pterophoridae
- Genus: Capperia
- Species: C. marginellus

Binomial name
- Capperia marginellus (Zeller, 1847)

Synonyms
- Pterophorus marginellus Zeller, 1847; Capperia marginella

Species of plume moth

Capperia marginellus is a moth of the family Pterophoridae. It is found on Sicily, Cyprus and Turkey.

The wingspan is about 14 mm.
