= Capperia meyi =

Scientific classification
- Kingdom: Animalia
- Phylum: Arthropoda
- Class: Insecta
- Order: Lepidoptera
- Family: Pterophoridae
- Genus: Capperia
- Species: C. meyi

Binomial name
- Capperia meyi Gielis, 2003

Species of plume moth

Capperia meyi is a moth of the family Pterophoridae. It is known from Luzon.

The wingspan is about 20 mm. Adults are on wing in November.

The host plant is unknown, but presumed to be, like for all other known species in the genus Capperia, in the family Labiatae.
