= Capperia bonneaui =

Scientific classification
- Kingdom: Animalia
- Phylum: Arthropoda
- Clade: Pancrustacea
- Class: Insecta
- Order: Lepidoptera
- Family: Pterophoridae
- Genus: Capperia
- Species: C. bonneaui

Binomial name
- Capperia bonneaui Bigot, 1987

Species of plume moth

Capperia bonneaui is a moth of the family Pterophoridae. It is found in Spain.
