= Capperia fletcheri =

Scientific classification
- Domain: Eukaryota
- Kingdom: Animalia
- Phylum: Arthropoda
- Class: Insecta
- Order: Lepidoptera
- Family: Pterophoridae
- Genus: Capperia
- Species: C. fletcheri

Binomial name
- Capperia fletcheri Adamczewski, 1951

Species of plume moth

Capperia fletcheri is a moth of the family Pterophoridae. It is found in Israel and the Palestinian Territories.

The wingspan is about 16 mm. Adults are dark brown in colour.
