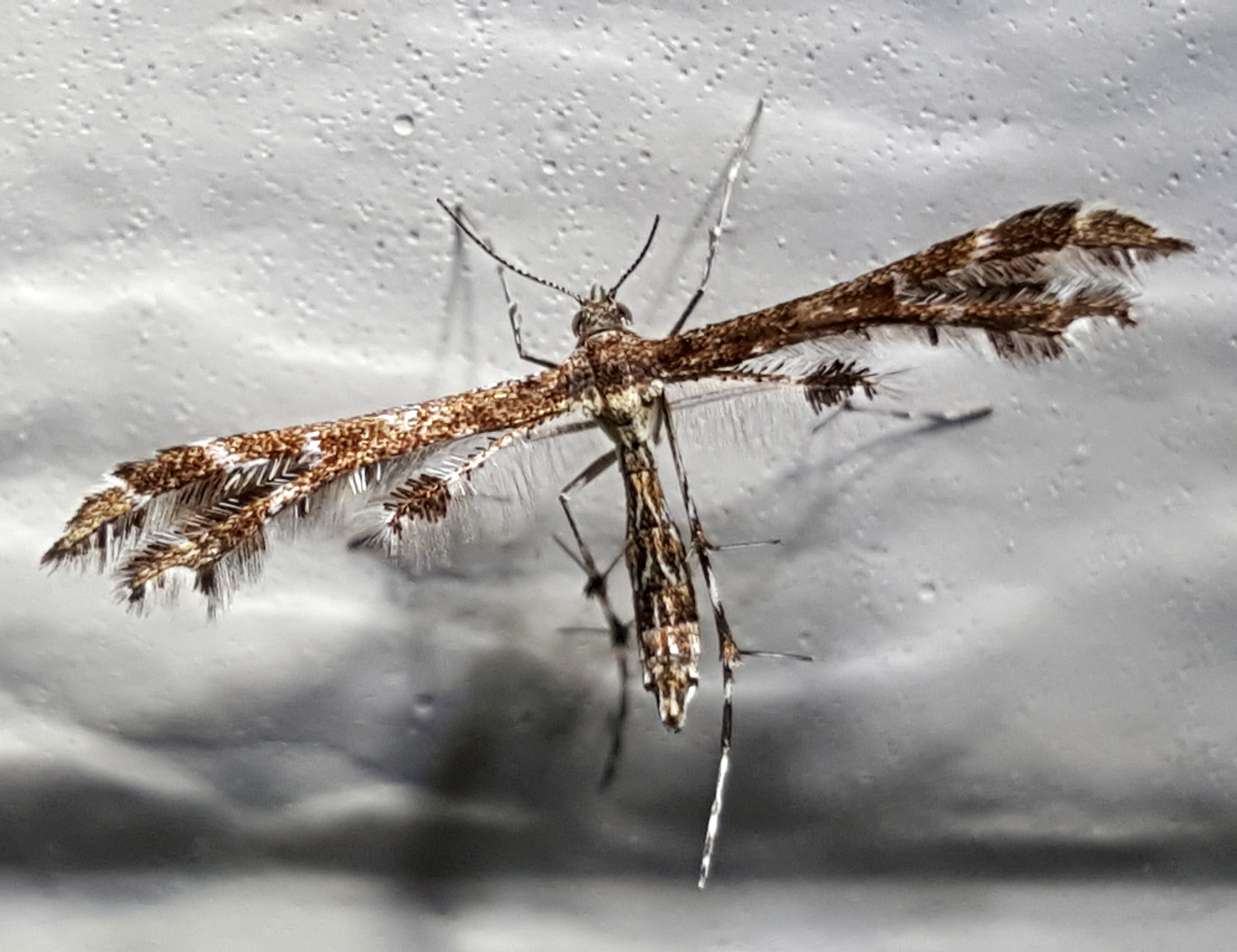

Scientific classification
- Kingdom: Animalia
- Phylum: Arthropoda
- Class: Insecta
- Order: Lepidoptera
- Family: Pterophoridae
- Genus: Capperia
- Species: C. raptor

Binomial name
- Capperia raptor (Meyrick, 1908)

Synonyms
- Oxyptilus raptor Meyrick, 1908

= Capperia raptor =

Species of plume moth

Capperia raptor is a species of moth in the family Pterophoridae. It is found in Canada and the US (including Colorado and Indiana).

== Description ==
The wingspan is about 19 mm. The abdomen is brown mixed with dark fuscous. The forewings are ferruginous-fuscous, irrorated (speckled) with dark fuscous. There is a small dark fuscous spot on the base of the cleft.
