= Capperia loranus =

Scientific classification
- Domain: Eukaryota
- Kingdom: Animalia
- Phylum: Arthropoda
- Class: Insecta
- Order: Lepidoptera
- Family: Pterophoridae
- Genus: Capperia
- Species: C. loranus

Binomial name
- Capperia loranus (Fuchs, 1895)

Synonyms
- Oxyptilus loranus Fuchs, 1895; Capperia lorana; Capperia sequanensis Gibeaux, 1990

Species of plume moth

Capperia loranus is a moth of the family Pterophoridae. It is found in Spain, France, Belgium, Germany, Italy, Austria, the Czech Republic and Slovakia.

The wingspan is 15–17 mm.

The larvae feed on cut-leaved germander (Teucrium botrys).
