= Capperia salanga =

Scientific classification
- Kingdom: Animalia
- Phylum: Arthropoda
- Class: Insecta
- Order: Lepidoptera
- Family: Pterophoridae
- Genus: Capperia
- Species: C. salanga

Binomial name
- Capperia salanga Arenberger, 1995

Species of plume moth

Capperia salanga is a moth of the family Pterophoridae. It is found in Afghanistan, Iran, Turkmenistan and Turkey.

The wingspan is 14–16 mm. The forewings and hindwings are light brown.
