= Capperia agadirensis =

Scientific classification
- Domain: Eukaryota
- Kingdom: Animalia
- Phylum: Arthropoda
- Class: Insecta
- Order: Lepidoptera
- Family: Pterophoridae
- Genus: Capperia
- Species: C. agadirensis

Binomial name
- Capperia agadirensis Arenberger, 2002

Species of plume moth

Capperia agadirensis is a moth of the family Pterophoridae which is endemic to Morocco.
