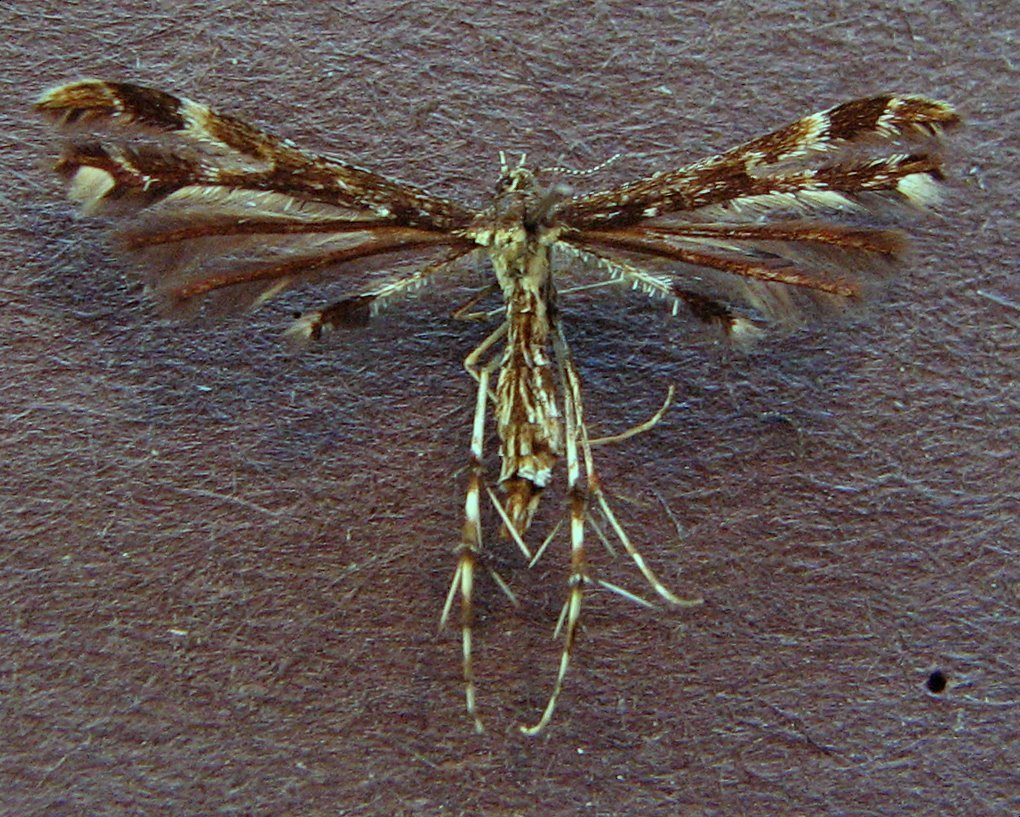

Scientific classification
- Domain: Eukaryota
- Kingdom: Animalia
- Phylum: Arthropoda
- Class: Insecta
- Order: Lepidoptera
- Family: Pterophoridae
- Genus: Capperia
- Species: C. ningoris

Binomial name
- Capperia ningoris (Walsingham, 1880)

Synonyms
- Oxyptilus ningoris; Oxyptilus bernardinus Grinnell, 1908; Capperia bernardinus (Grinnell, 1908)

= Capperia ningoris =

Species of plume moth

Capperia ningoris is a species of moth in the family Pterophoridae. It is found in North America, including California, Oregon and Alberta.

The wingspan is 18–20 mm. Adults are dark-brown with a grayish tint.

The larvae have been recorded feeding on Hieracium albiflorum. The young larvae were found webbing the heads and deforming the leaves of their host plant. They are green with a pale yellow head. Pupation takes place in a pale yellow pupa.
