= Capperia fusca =

Scientific classification
- Domain: Eukaryota
- Kingdom: Animalia
- Phylum: Arthropoda
- Class: Insecta
- Order: Lepidoptera
- Family: Pterophoridae
- Genus: Capperia
- Species: C. fusca

Binomial name
- Capperia fusca (O. Hofmann, 1898)

Synonyms
- Oxyptilus leonuri var. fusca Hofmann, 1898; Capperia fusca f. marrubii Adamczewski, 1951; Capperia marrubii Adamczewski, 1951

Species of plume moth

Capperia fusca is a moth of the family Pterophoridae. It is found in Spain, France, Belgium, Germany, Switzerland, Italy, Austria, Croatia, the Czech Republic, Poland, Slovakia, Hungary, Romania, Bulgaria, North Macedonia, Greece and southern Russia. It is also known from Turkey.

It is a montane species.

The larvae feed on Stachys alpina and Stachys cassia.
