= Capperia zelleri =

Scientific classification
- Kingdom: Animalia
- Phylum: Arthropoda
- Clade: Pancrustacea
- Class: Insecta
- Order: Lepidoptera
- Family: Pterophoridae
- Genus: Capperia
- Species: C. zelleri

Binomial name
- Capperia zelleri Adamczewski, 1951

Species of plume moth

Capperia zelleri is a moth of the family Pterophoridae found on Sicily.

The wingspan is about 14 mm.
