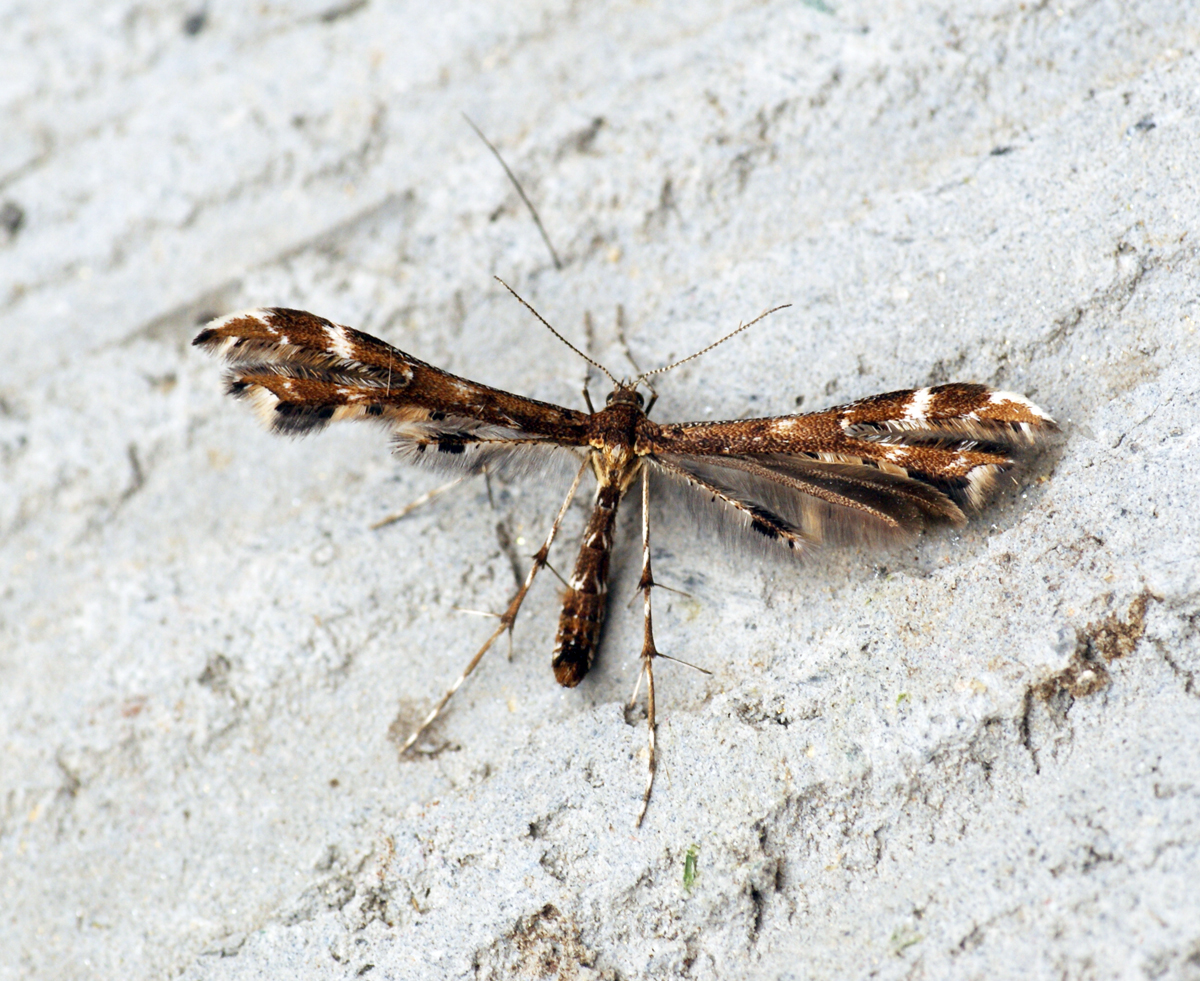
- Capperia britanniodactylus

Scientific classification
- Kingdom: Animalia
- Phylum: Arthropoda
- Class: Insecta
- Order: Lepidoptera
- Family: Pterophoridae
- Subfamily: Pterophorinae
- Tribe: Oxyptilini
- Genus: Capperia; Tutt, 1905

= Capperia =

Plume moth genus

Capperia is a genus of moths in the family Pterophoridae.

== Species ==
- Capperia agadirensis
- Capperia bonneaui
- Capperia britanniodactylus (Gregson, 1867)
- Capperia browni
- Capperia celeusi (Frey, 1886)
- Capperia evansi
- Capperia fletcheri
- Capperia fusca (O. Hofmann,1898)
- Capperia hellenica
- Capperia irkutica
- Capperia jozana
- Capperia loranus
- Capperia maratonica
- Capperia marginellus
- Capperia meyi
- Capperia ningoris
- Capperia polonica
- Capperia raptor
- Capperia salanga Arenberger, 1995
- Capperia taurica
- Capperia trichodactyla
- Capperia washbourni
- Capperia zelleri
