= Capperia jozana =

Scientific classification
- Kingdom: Animalia
- Phylum: Arthropoda
- Clade: Pancrustacea
- Class: Insecta
- Order: Lepidoptera
- Family: Pterophoridae
- Genus: Capperia
- Species: C. jozana

Binomial name
- Capperia jozana (Matsumura, 1931)

Synonyms
- Oxyptilia jozana Matsumura, 1931; Oxyptilus jozana

Species of plume moth

Capperia jozana is a moth of the family Pterophoridae. It is known from Hokkaido island Japan.

The length of the forewings is 7–8 mm.
