= Capperia taurica =

Scientific classification
- Kingdom: Animalia
- Phylum: Arthropoda
- Class: Insecta
- Order: Lepidoptera
- Family: Pterophoridae
- Genus: Capperia
- Species: C. taurica

Binomial name
- Capperia taurica Zagulajev, 1986

Species of plume moth

Capperia taurica is a moth of the family Pterophoridae. It is found in Ukraine and southern Russia. It has also been recorded from China.

The wingspan is 16–17 mm.
