= Capperia browni =

Scientific classification
- Kingdom: Animalia
- Phylum: Arthropoda
- Clade: Pancrustacea
- Class: Insecta
- Order: Lepidoptera
- Family: Pterophoridae
- Genus: Capperia
- Species: C. browni

Binomial name
- Capperia browni Brown & Powell, 2006

Species of plume moth

Capperia browni is a species of moth in the genus Capperia, known from Mexico. Moths in this species take flight in August, and have a wingspan of about 12.5 millimetres. The specific name refers to Dr. John Brown, who collected the species for examination.
