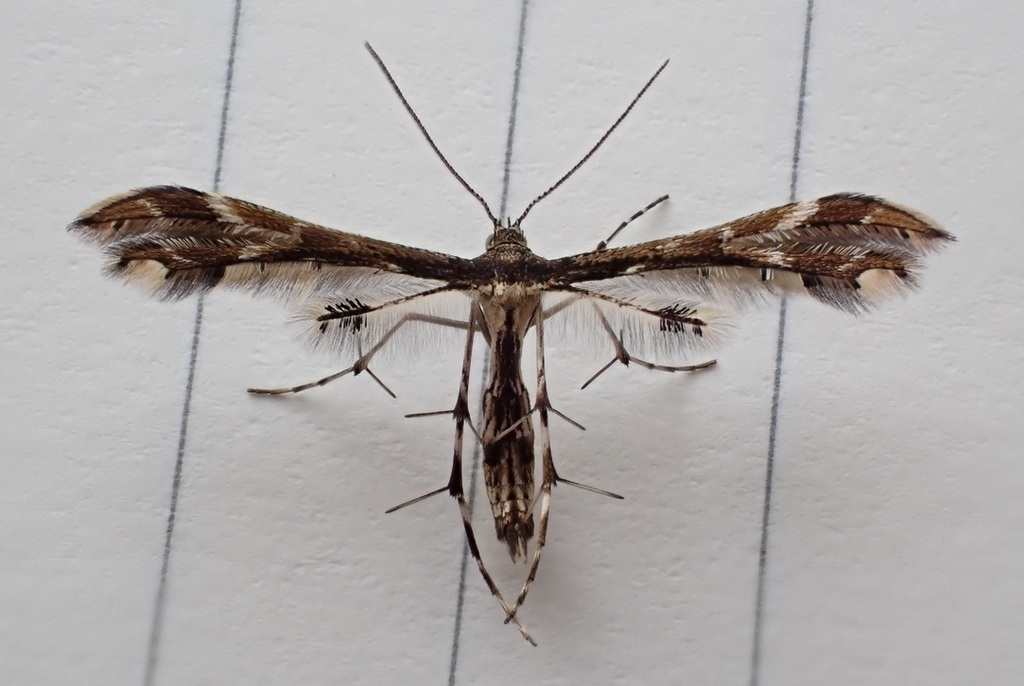

Scientific classification
- Domain: Eukaryota
- Kingdom: Animalia
- Phylum: Arthropoda
- Class: Insecta
- Order: Lepidoptera
- Family: Pterophoridae
- Genus: Capperia
- Species: C. evansi

Binomial name
- Capperia evansi (McDunnough, 1923)

Synonyms
- Pterophorus evansi McDunnough, 1923

= Capperia evansi =

Species of plume moth

Capperia evansi is a moth of the family Pterophoridae. It is found in Canada.

The wingspan is about 14 mm. Adults are on wing in the beginning of June and again from the middle of July to the beginning of August in two generations per year.

The larvae feed on Scutellaria species. They damage the main stem of the host plant and make it droop. The larvae are hidden amongst withered leaves.
