= Capperia polonica =

Scientific classification
- Domain: Eukaryota
- Kingdom: Animalia
- Phylum: Arthropoda
- Class: Insecta
- Order: Lepidoptera
- Family: Pterophoridae
- Genus: Capperia
- Species: C. polonica

Binomial name
- Capperia polonica Adamczewski, 1951

Species of plume moth

Capperia polonica is a moth of the family Pterophoridae. It is found in Spain, France, Sardinia, Corsica, Croatia and Greece. It has also been recorded from Asia Minor.

The wingspan is 14–18 mm.

The larvae feed on Teucrium flavum.
