= Capperia washbourni =

Scientific classification
- Domain: Eukaryota
- Kingdom: Animalia
- Phylum: Arthropoda
- Class: Insecta
- Order: Lepidoptera
- Family: Pterophoridae
- Genus: Capperia
- Species: C. washbourni

Binomial name
- Capperia washbourni Adamczewski, 1951

Species of plume moth

Capperia washbourni is a moth of the family Pterophoridae. It is found in Greece, Asia Minor, Syria and the Palestinian Territories.

The wingspan is about 18 mm for males and about 15 mm for females.
