= Capperia celeusi =

Scientific classification
- Domain: Eukaryota
- Kingdom: Animalia
- Phylum: Arthropoda
- Class: Insecta
- Order: Lepidoptera
- Family: Pterophoridae
- Genus: Capperia
- Species: C. celeusi

Binomial name
- Capperia celeusi (Frey, 1886)

Synonyms
- Oxyptilus celeusi Frey, 1886; Capperia belutschistanella Amsel, 1959; Oxyptilus intercisus Meyrick, 1930; Capperia intercisus (Meyrick, 1930); Capperia karakalensis Gibeaux, 1997

Species of plume moth

Capperia celeusi is a moth of the family Pterophoridae. It is known from most of Europe, Ukraine, Russia, Turkey, Lebanon, Turkmenistan and the United Arab Emirates.

The wingspan is 14–17 mm.

The larvae feed on wall germander (Teucrium chamaedrys) and probably Teucrium stocksianum.
