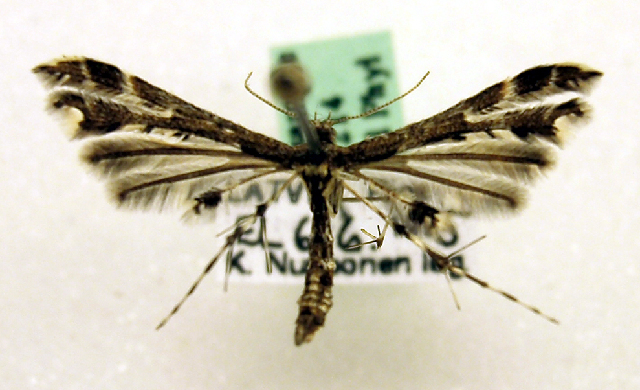

Conservation status
- Least Concern (IUCN 3.1)

Scientific classification
- Domain: Eukaryota
- Kingdom: Animalia
- Phylum: Arthropoda
- Class: Insecta
- Order: Lepidoptera
- Family: Pterophoridae
- Genus: Capperia
- Species: C. trichodactyla

Binomial name
- Capperia trichodactyla (Denis & Schiffermüller, 1775)

Synonyms
- Alucita trichodactyla Denis & Schiffermüller, 1775; Oxyptilus leonuri Stange, 1882; Oxyptilus affinis Müller-Rutz, 1934

= Capperia trichodactyla =

Species of plume moth

Capperia trichodactyla is a moth of the family Pterophoridae. It is found in central and southern Europe.

The wingspan is 15–20 mm (0.59–0.79 in).

The larvae feed on motherwort (Leonurus cardiaca).
