= Capperia irkutica =

Scientific classification
- Kingdom: Animalia
- Phylum: Arthropoda
- Class: Insecta
- Order: Lepidoptera
- Family: Pterophoridae
- Genus: Capperia
- Species: C. irkutica

Binomial name
- Capperia irkutica Arenberger, 1989

Species of plume moth

Capperia irkutica is a moth of the family Pterophoridae. It is found in Irkutsk Oblast, Russia.
