= Charles Stuart Gregson =

Charles Stuart Gregson (29 May 1817 - 31 January 1899) was an English entomological collector who worked as a ship painter. He was considered a very industrious collector of specimens and named several species of moth. Agrotis spinifera sometimes goes by the name of Gregson's Dart.

Gregson was born in Lancaster and worked in Liverpool as a ship painter. He was an avid collector of moths and discovered many species new to Britain and a few new to science that he described. He started writing around 1842 to local journals and was known for collecting from localities that he kept secret. Fearing that he was going blind, he sold off his collection of nearly 28,000 specimens to Sydney Webb in 1888. After recovering his eyesight, he began to collect again but this time focussed on beetles. He kept an African eagle at home and served as a secretary to the Northern Entomological Society and the East Lancashire Natural History Society and maintained meeting minutes which revealed his lack of an education. He was known to be argumentative and was sometimes regarded with doubt as Edwin Brown remarked in a letter to Charles Darwin.
