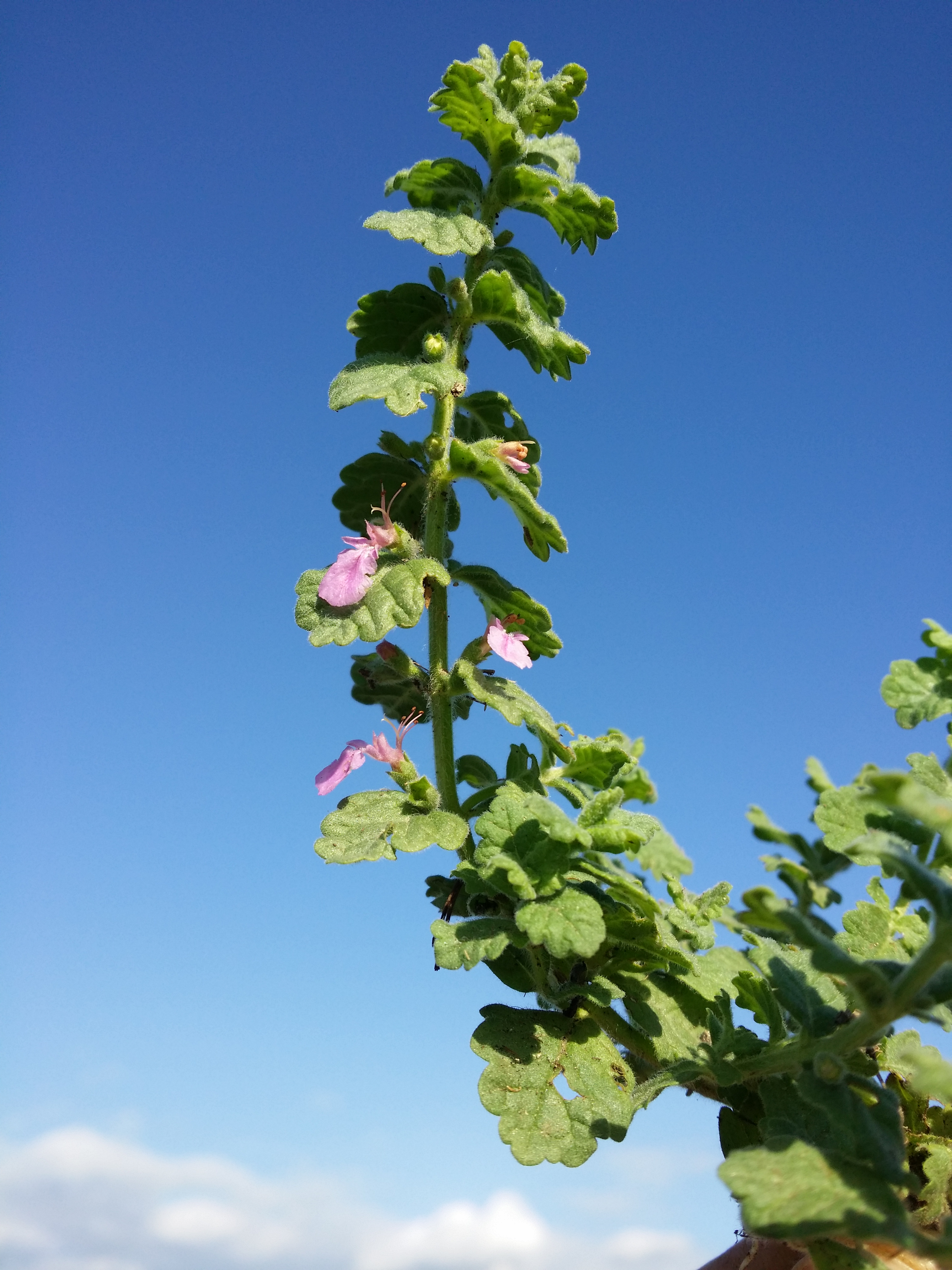

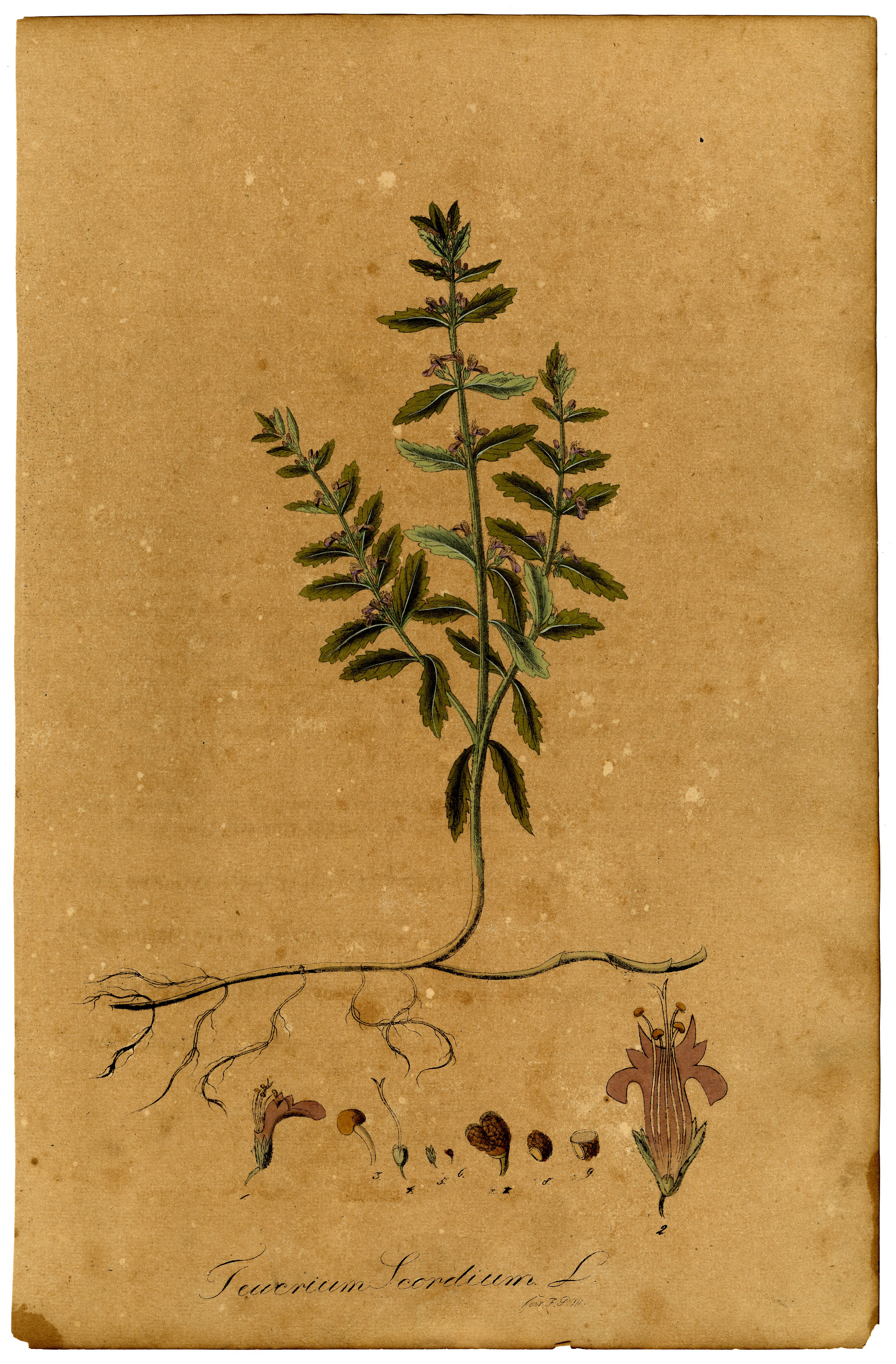
- Botanical illustration

Scientific classification
- Kingdom: Plantae
- Clade: Embryophytes
- Clade: Tracheophytes
- Clade: Spermatophytes
- Clade: Angiosperms
- Clade: Eudicots
- Clade: Asterids
- Order: Lamiales
- Family: Lamiaceae
- Genus: Teucrium
- Species: T. scordium

Binomial name
- Teucrium scordium L.

= Teucrium scordium =

Species of flowering plant

Teucrium scordium, known commonly as water germander, is a species of flowering plant belonging to the family Lamiaceae.

== Distribution ==
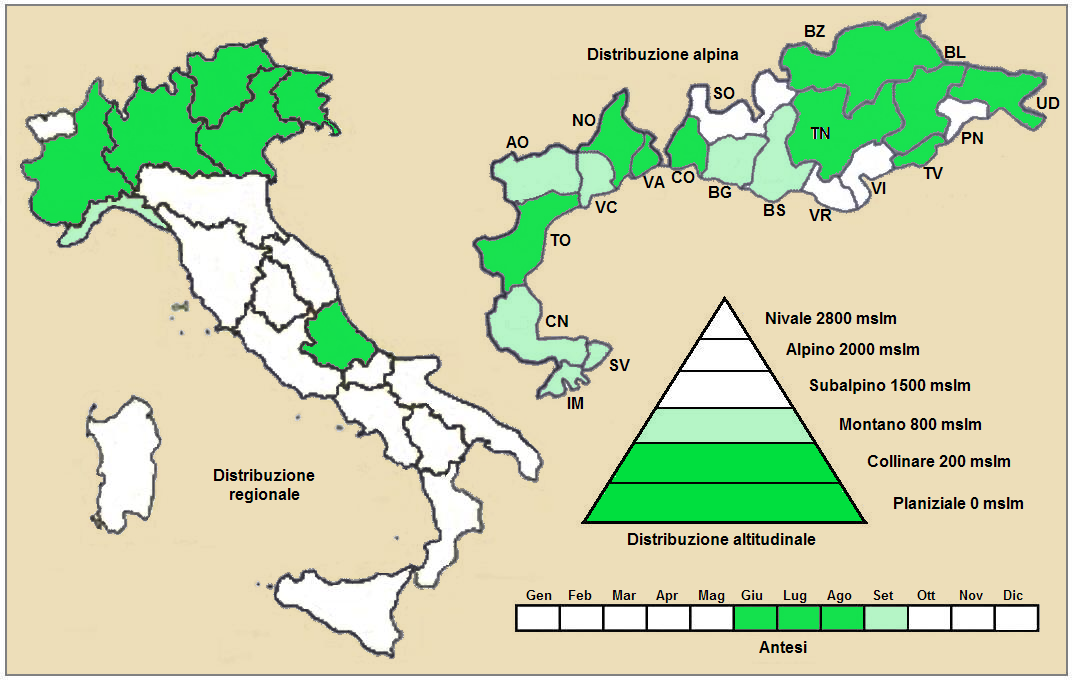
Italian distribution

Its native range is Europe to China.

== Gallery ==
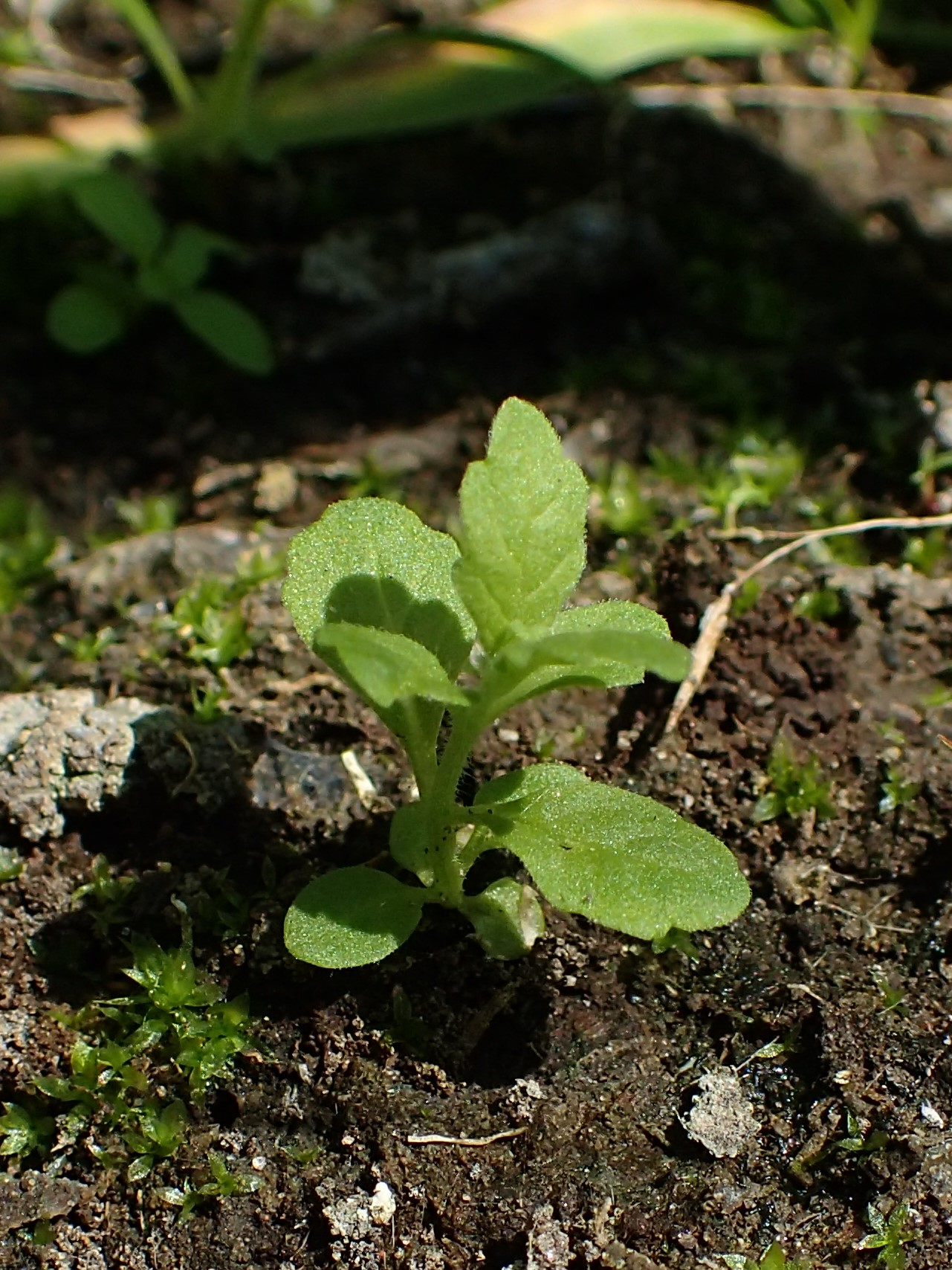
Seedling

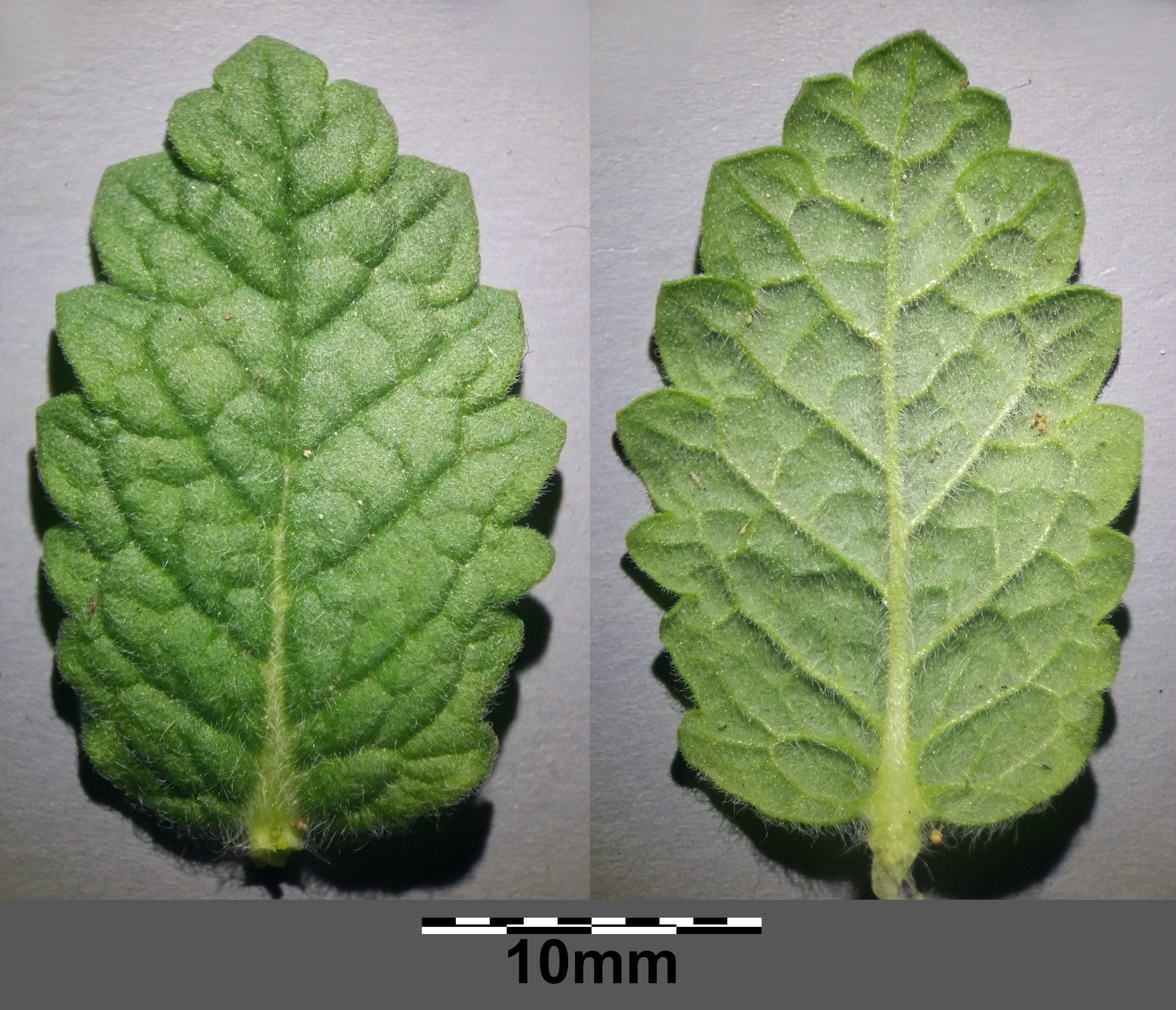
Leaf

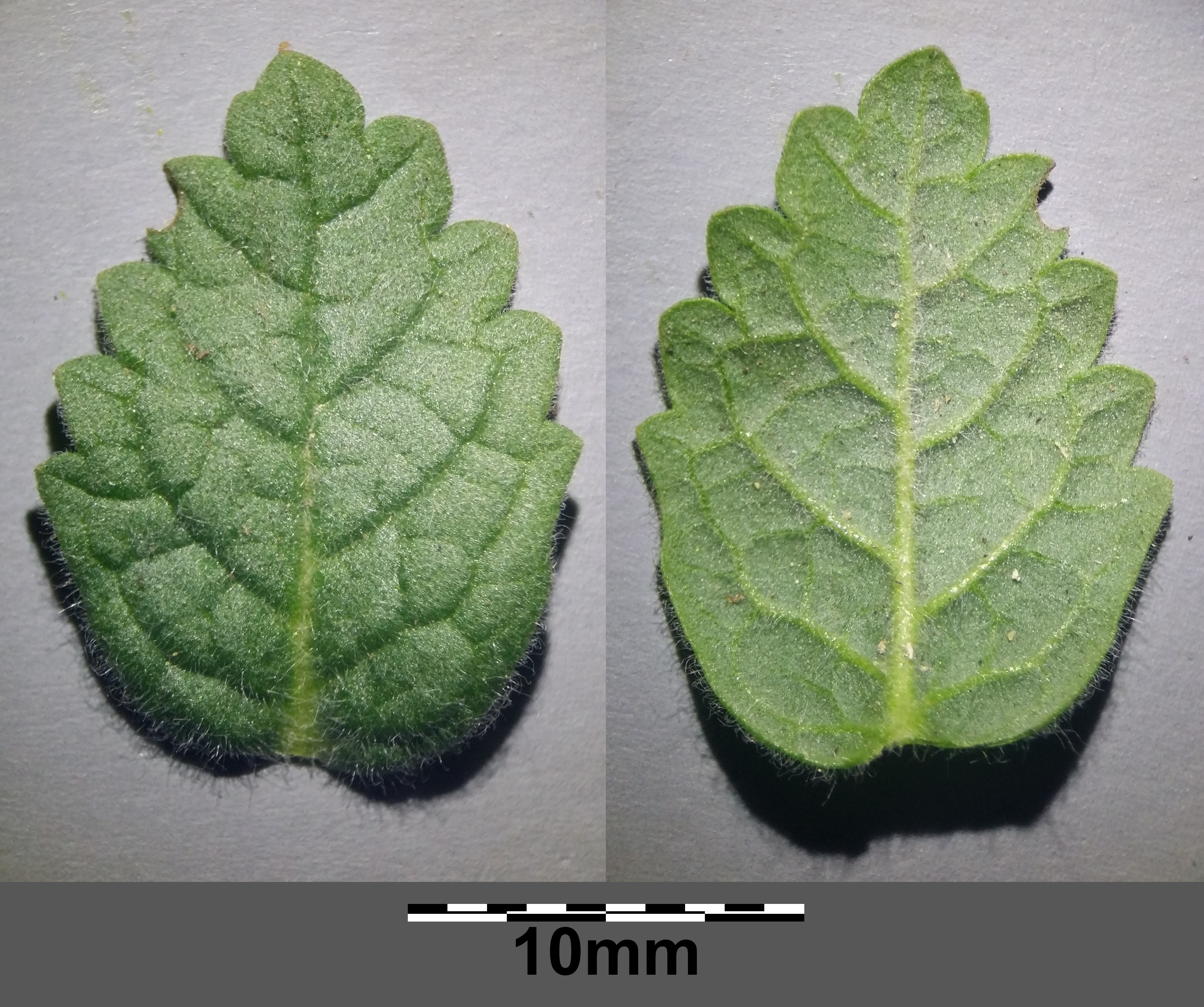
Bract

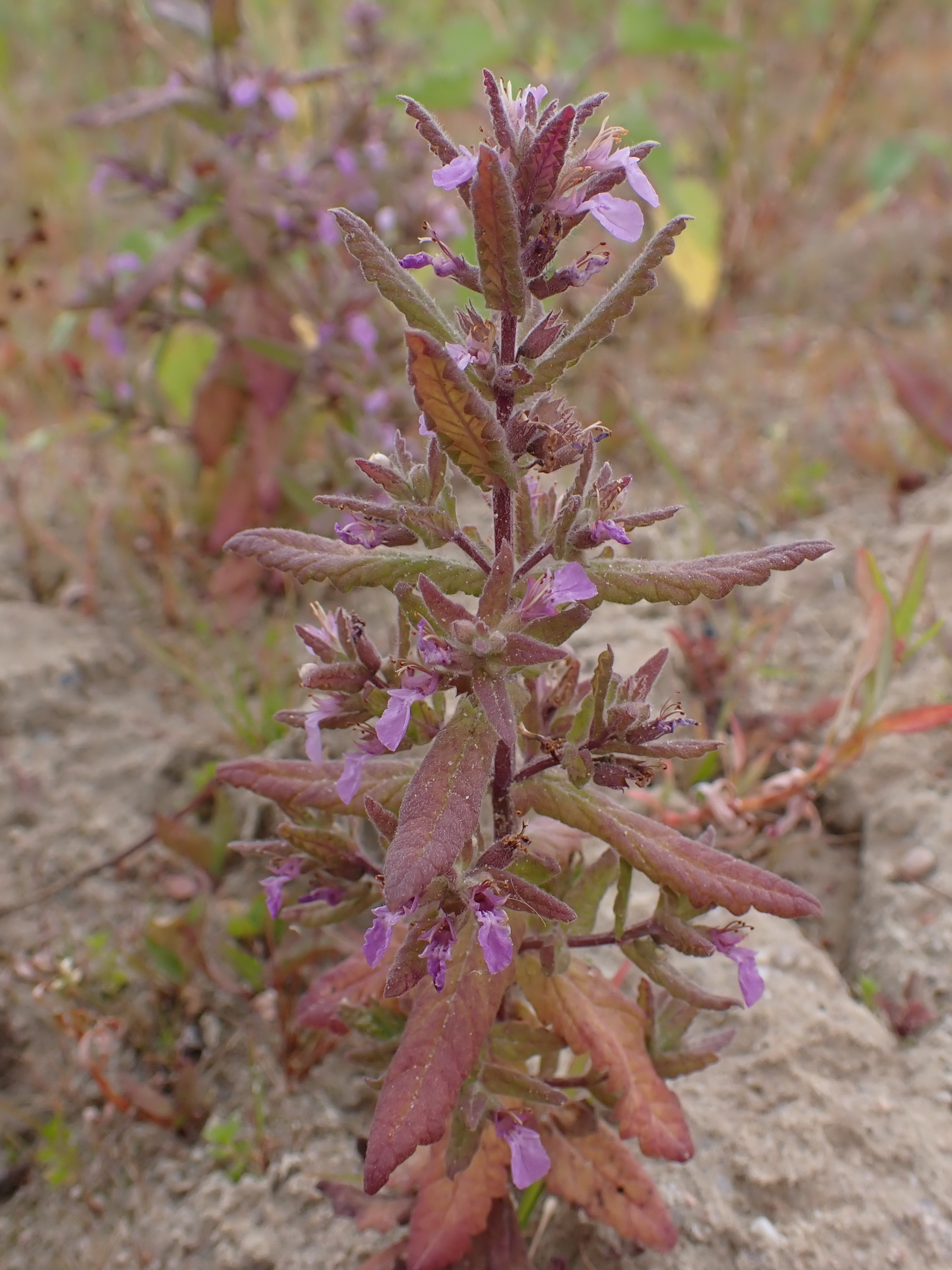
Exposed individual

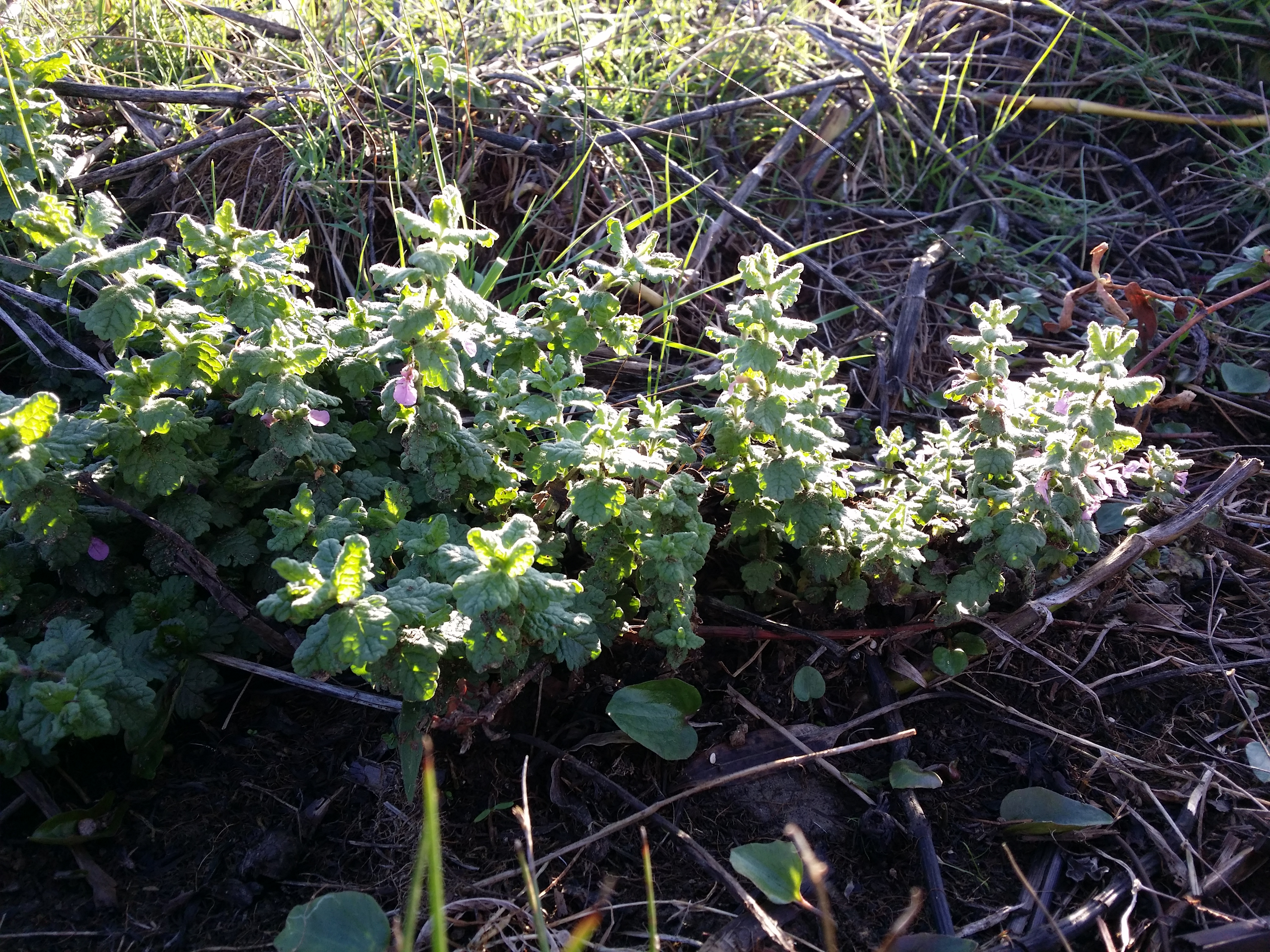
Flowering stalk

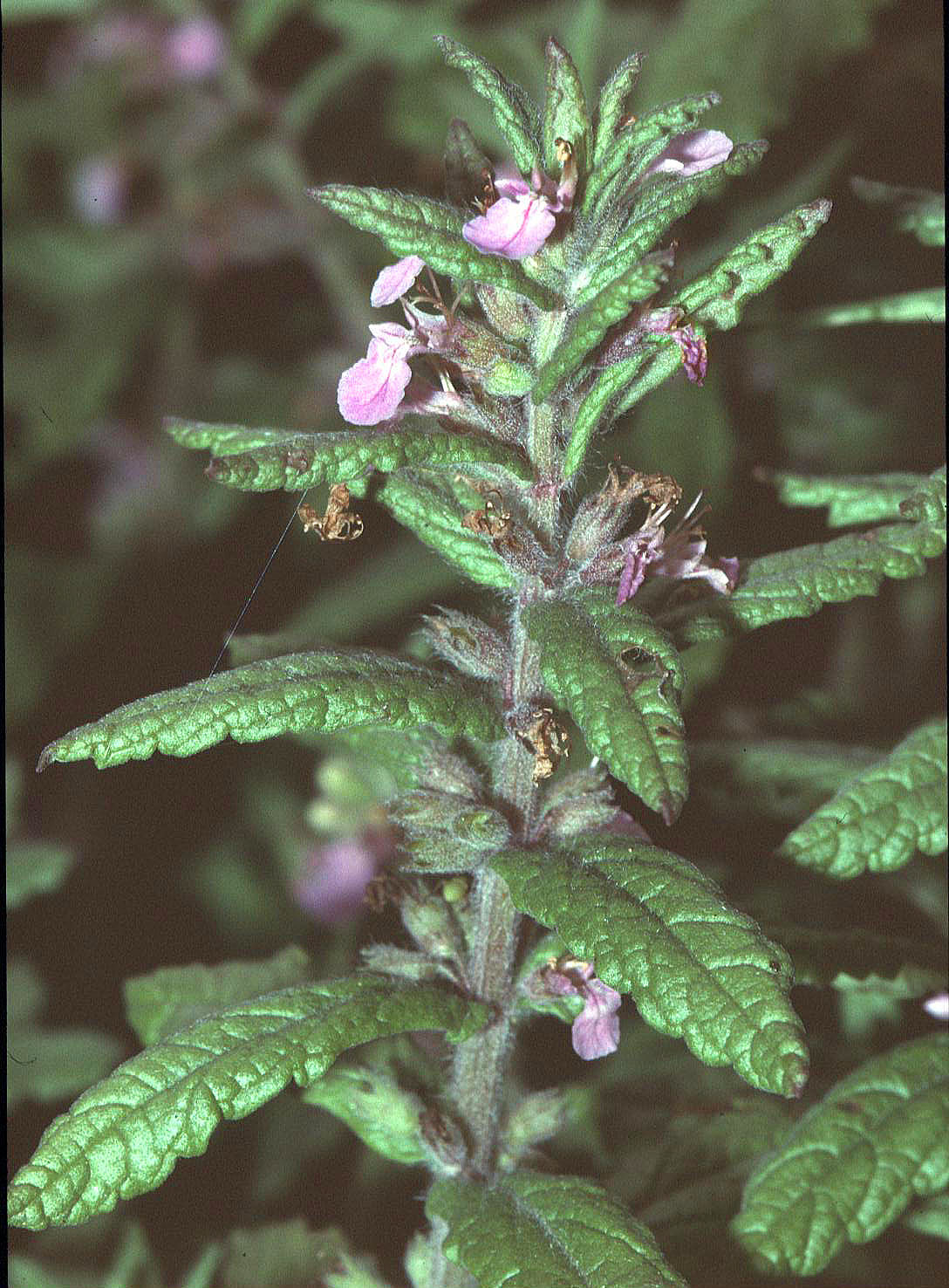
Flowering stalk

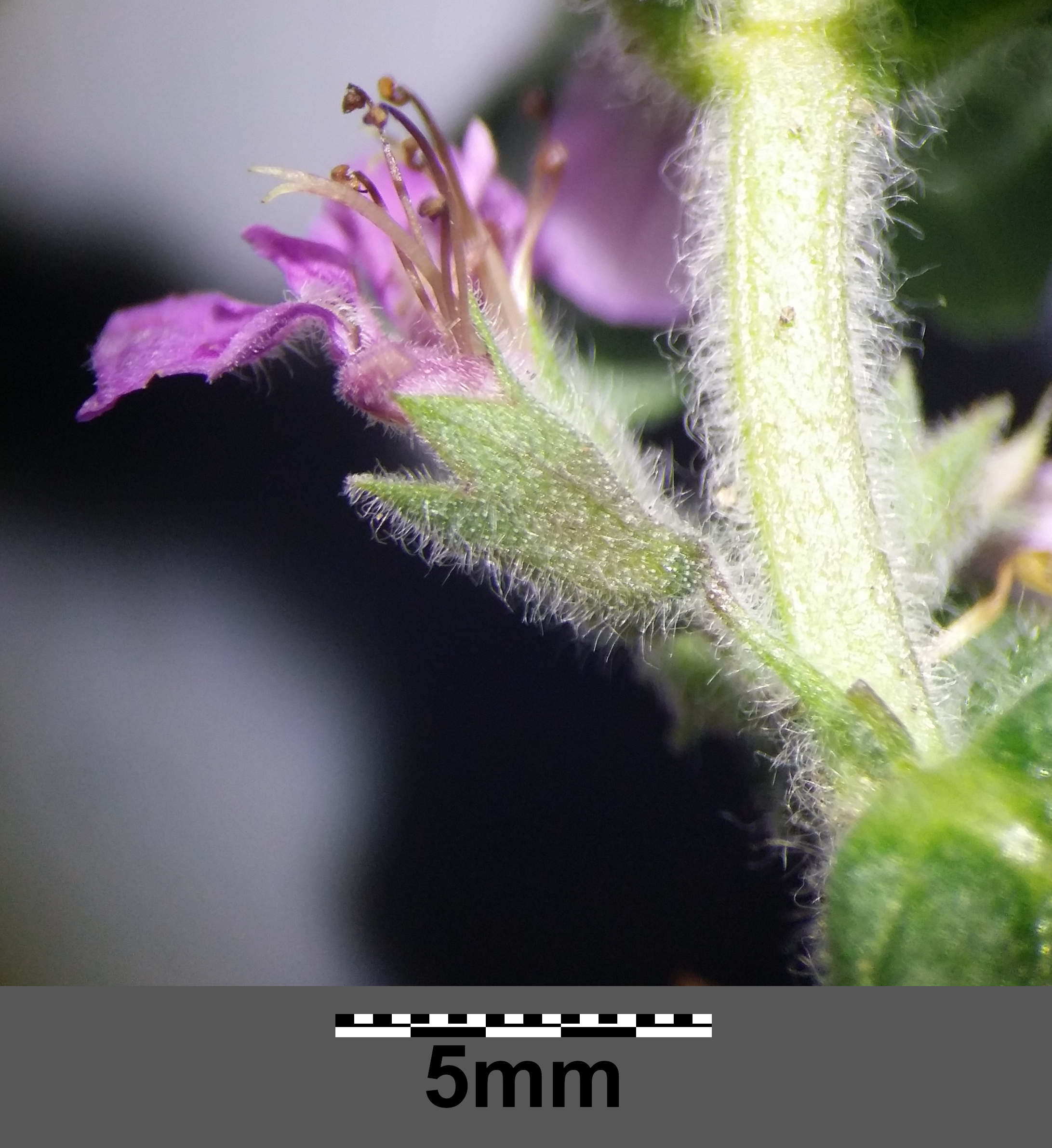
Flower
