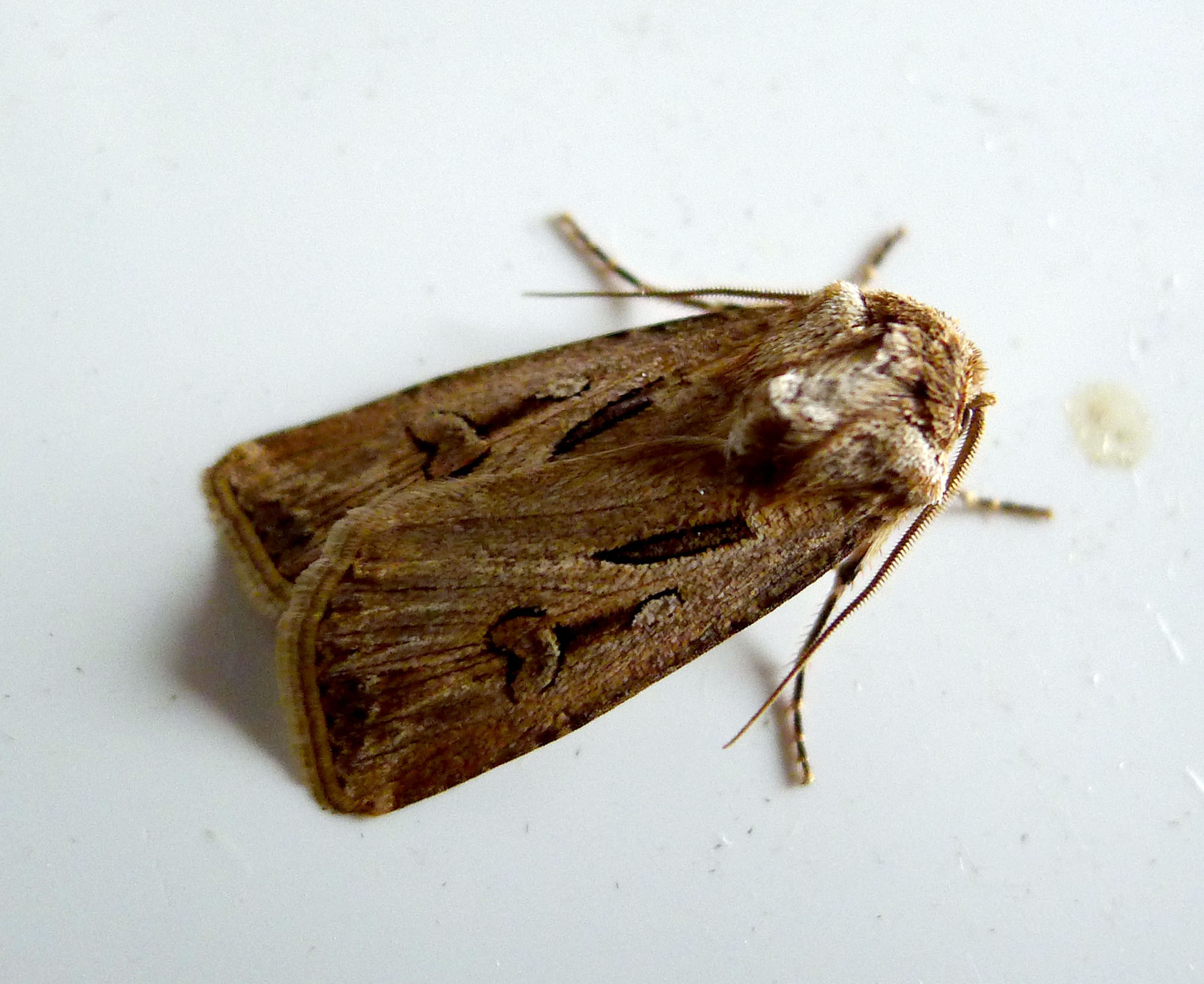

Scientific classification
- Kingdom: Animalia
- Phylum: Arthropoda
- Clade: Pancrustacea
- Class: Insecta
- Order: Lepidoptera
- Superfamily: Noctuoidea
- Family: Noctuidae
- Genus: Agrotis
- Species: A. spinifera

Binomial name
- Agrotis spinifera (Hübner, 1808)

Synonyms
- Agrotis biconica Kolar, 1844; Agrotis biconicus Kolar, 1844; Noctua spinifera Hübner, 1808; Agrotis spiculifera (Hübner, 1808); Euxoa spinifera

= Agrotis spinifera =

Gregson's dart

Species of moth

Agrotis spinifera, or Gregson's dart, is a species of moth in the family Noctuidae. The species was first described by Jacob Hübner in 1808 and is found in southern Europe, Arabia to southern Africa, Madagascar, Turkey, Iraq, Iran, Afghanistan, Pakistan, India to Myanmar and Sri Lanka.

== Description ==
The wingspan is 32–34 mm. It differs from Agrotis segetum in having almost quite obsolete sub-basal antemedial and postmedial lines of forewings. Submarginal line strongly dentate with dark streaks on it. Orbicular elongate with a dark streak runs from it to the reniform. Claviform is very elongate and filled in with black.
