= August Fuchs =

German entomologist

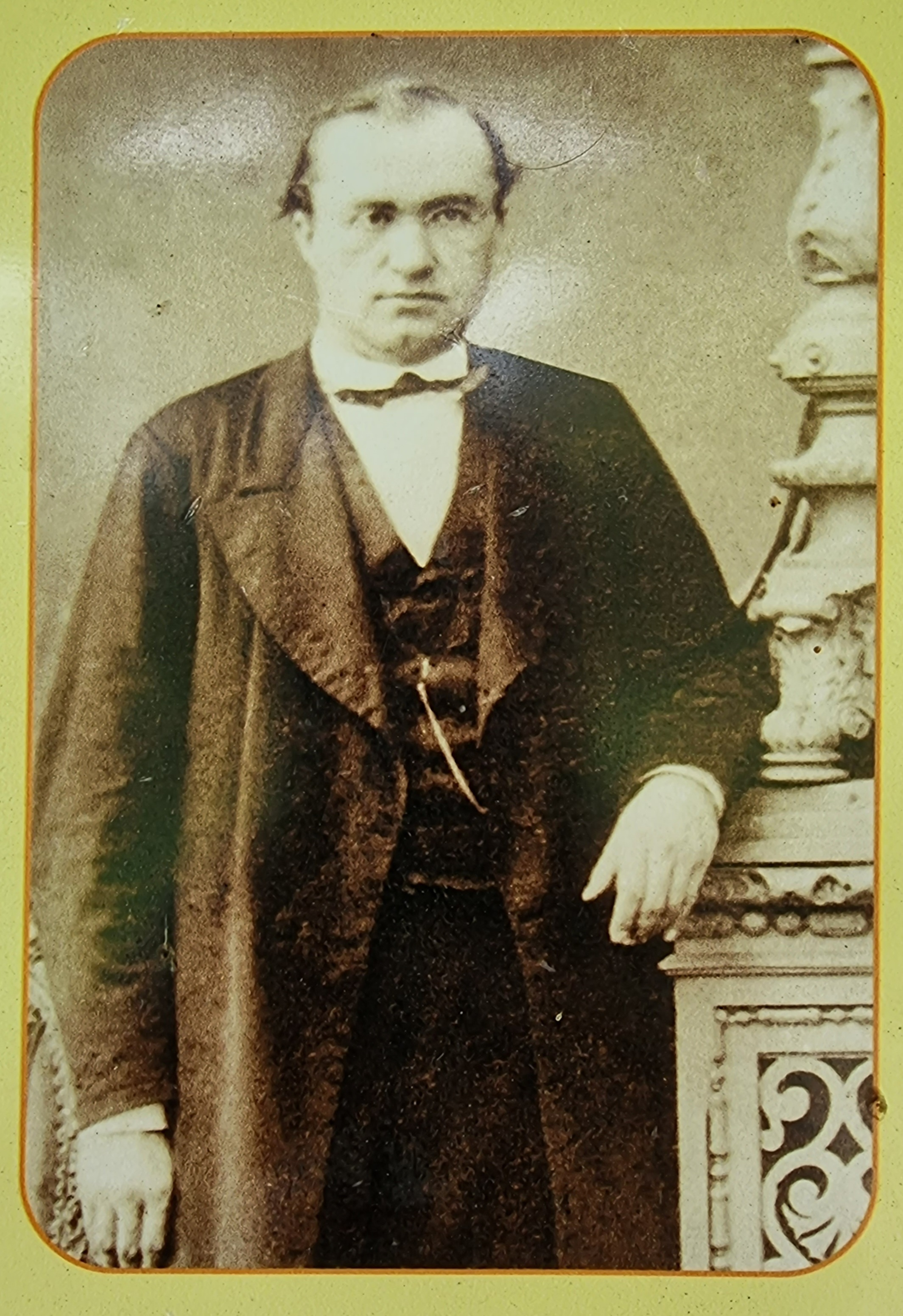
- Born: 1839
- Died: 1904 (aged 64–65)
- Citizenship: Germany
- Scientific career
- Fields: Entomology

August Fuchs (1839, Grävenwiesbach – 1904, Bornich) was a German entomologist who specialised in Lepidoptera. He wrote Kleinschmetterlinge der Loreley-Gegend Stettin ent. Ztg. 56 (1-6) : 21-52 (1895) in which he first described Capperia loranus and Über die neuesten Lepidopterologischen Forschungen in der Loreley-Gegend Jahrbücher des Nassauischen Vereins für Naturkunde 52: 159 - 173 (1899). His collection of Palearctic lepidoptera is in Museum Wiesbaden
