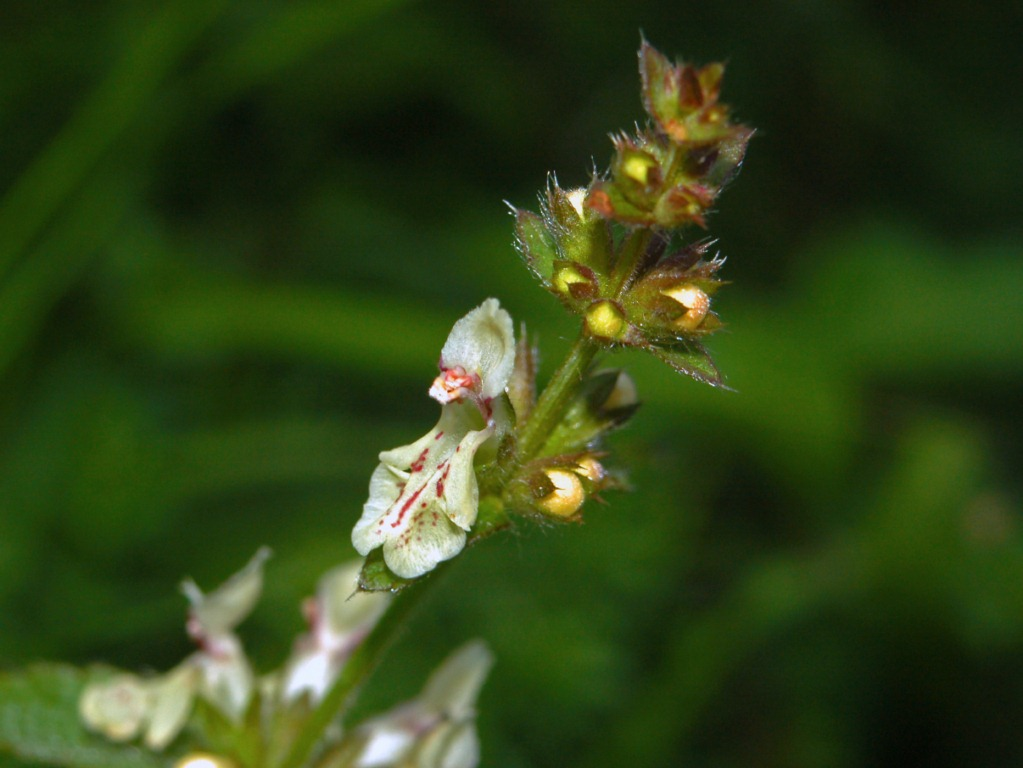
- Inflorescence of Stachys recta

Scientific classification
- Kingdom: Plantae
- Clade: Tracheophytes
- Clade: Angiosperms
- Clade: Eudicots
- Clade: Asterids
- Order: Lamiales
- Family: Lamiaceae
- Genus: Stachys
- Species: S. recta

Binomial name
- Stachys recta L.

Synonyms
- Betonica recta (L.) Baill.; Ortostachys recta (L.) Fourr., Prasium stachys E.H.L.Krause

= Stachys recta =

Species of flowering plant

Stachys recta, commonly known as stiff hedgenettle or perennial yellow-woundwort, is herbaceous perennial plant of the family Lamiaceae.

== Etymology ==
The generic epithet is derived from the Greek word σταχυς (stachys), meaning "an ear of grain", and refers to the fact that the inflorescence is often a spike. The specific epithet comes from the Latin recta, meaning "straight", also refers to the shape of the inflorescence.

== Description ==
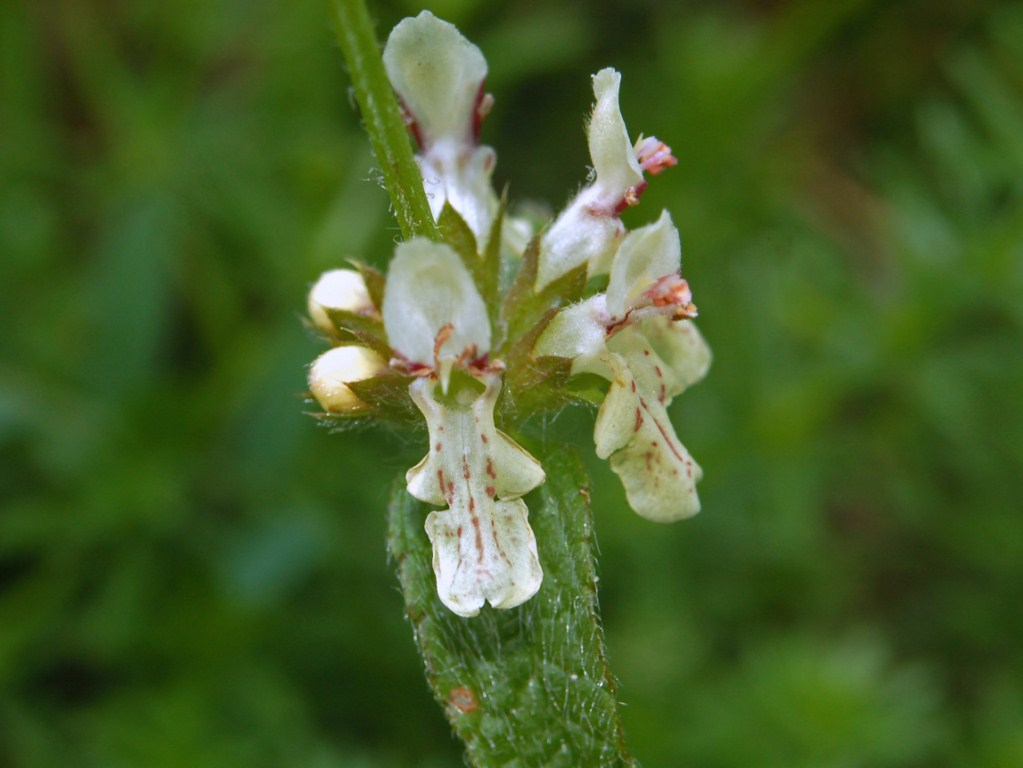
Close-up on flowers of S. recta subsp. recta

The biological form of S. recta is hemicryptophyte scapose, as its overwintering buds are situated just below the soil surface and the floral axis is more or less erect with a few leaves.

The plant reaches on average 20–40 centimetres (7.9–15.7 in) in height. It has thick, woody roots. The stems are strong, simple or branched, with slightly rough glandular hairs. The leaves are ovate-spatulate to oblong-lanceolate, with toothed edges and a long petiole. The length of the leaves is 3–5 centimetres (1.2–2.0 in) and the width 0.5 to 2 cm. 5–20 millimetres (0.20–0.79 in).

The flowers are gathered in a dense terminal spike and are usually yellowish-white, stained by purple or brown spots. The calyx is 5–10 centimetres (2.0–3.9 in) long. The flowering period extends from July through October. The flowers are hermaphrodite and pollinated by insects. The fruit are achenes about 2 mm long, rounded, chestnut-brown and smooth or very finely punctured. This plant is strictly related to S. officinalis, and has similar properties and characteristics.

== Distribution ==
This plant is a sub-Mediterranean floral element and it is widespread from Europe to the Caucasus and Asia Minor.

== Habitat ==
Stachys recta grows in lawns, in semi-dry and dry grasslands and in rocky hillsides. It prefers calcareous and moderately dry soil, at an altitude of 0–2,100 metres (0–6,890 ft) above sea level.

== Gallery ==
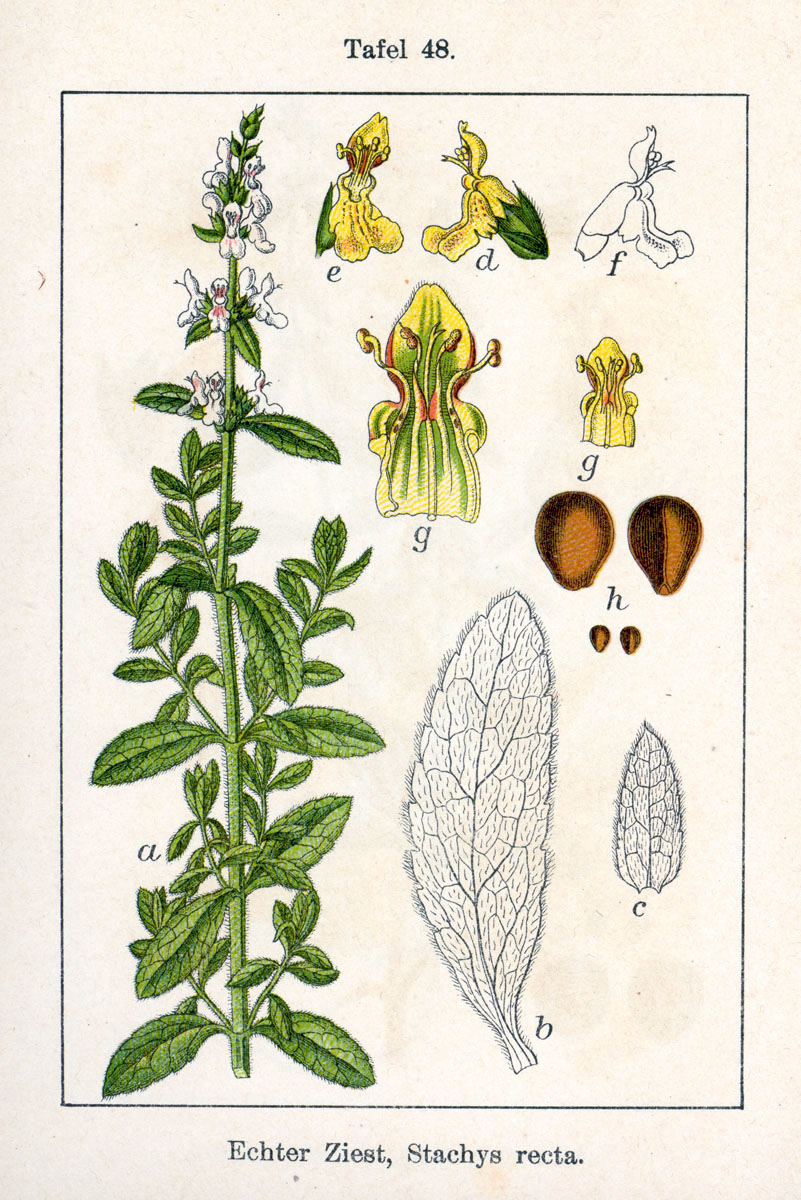
Figure of S. recta from Deutschlands Flora in Abbildungen, 1796.

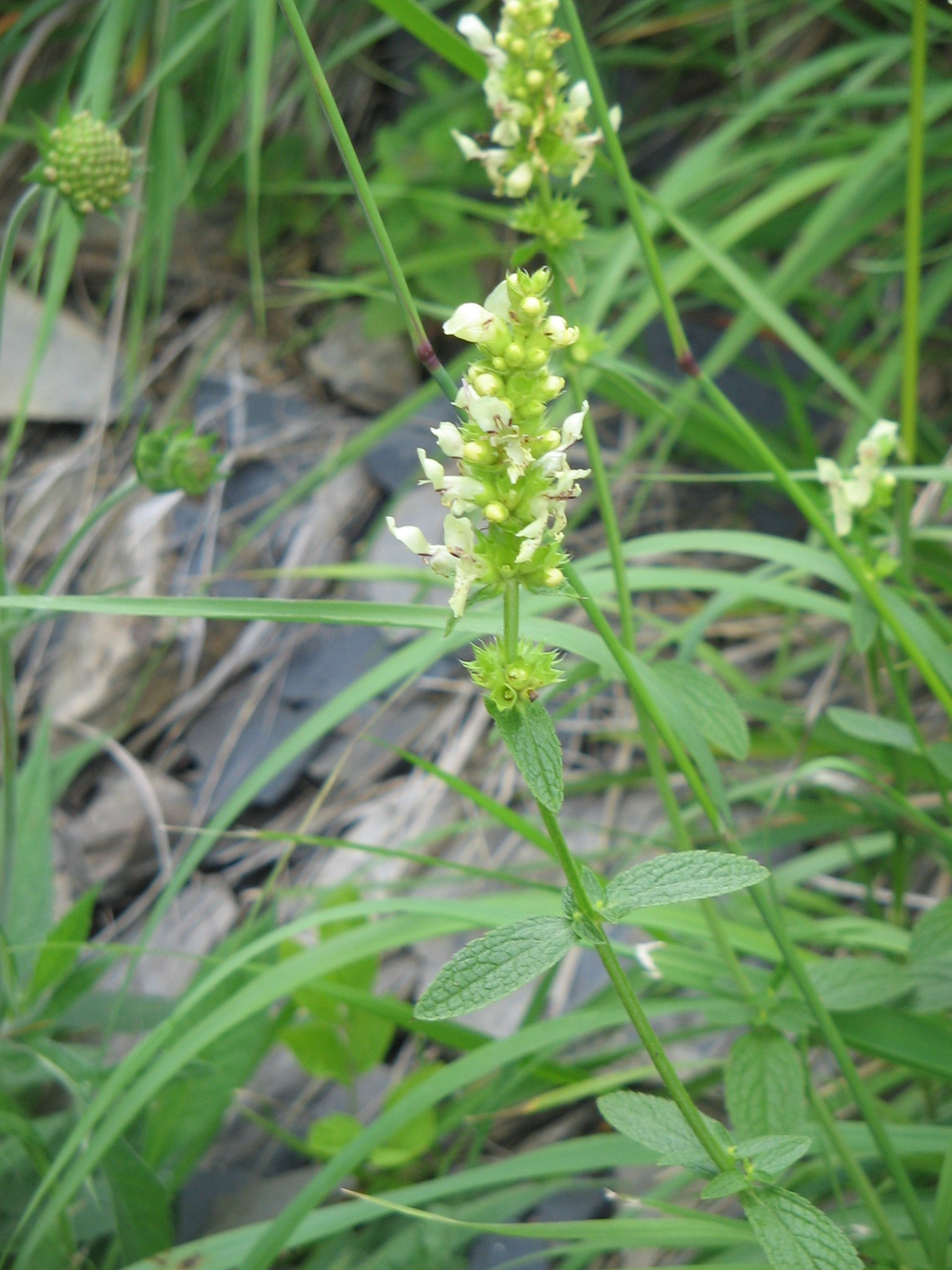
Plant of S. recta.

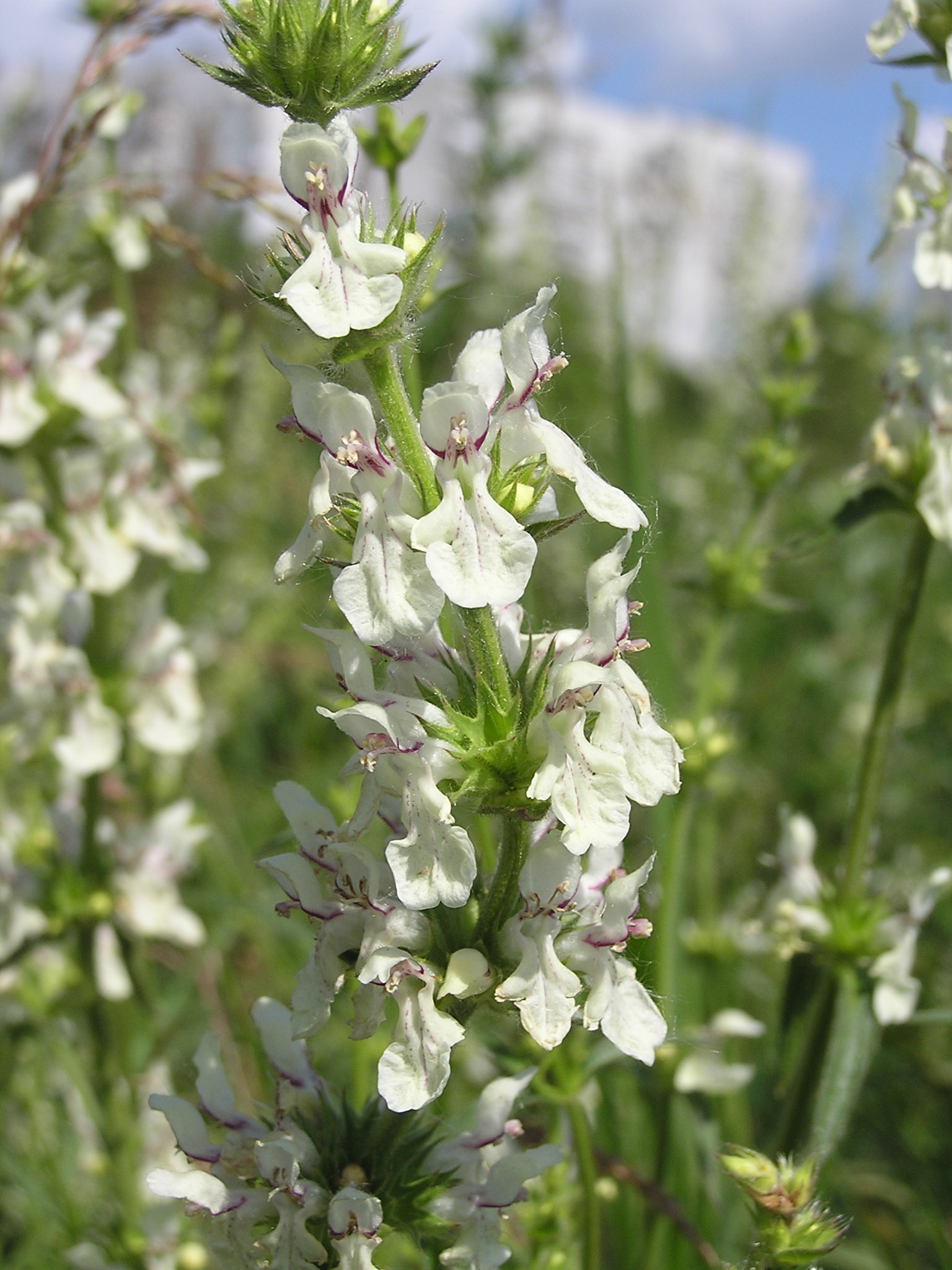
Flowers of S. recta.

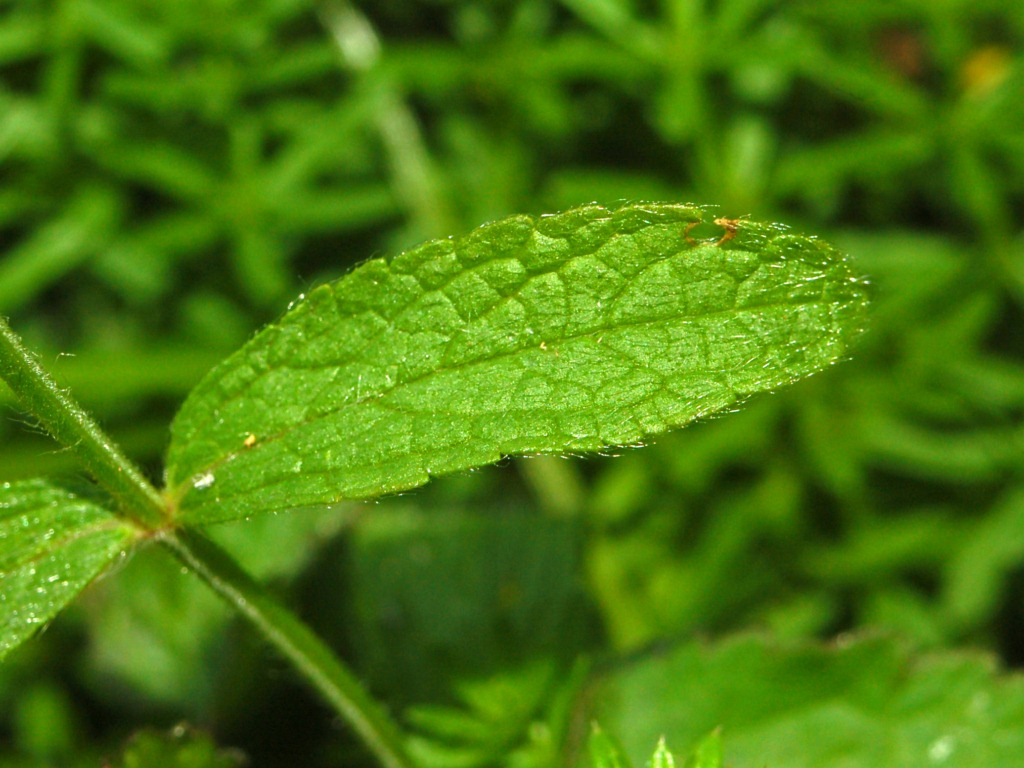
Leaf of S. recta

== Subspecies ==
- Stachys recta L. subsp. labiosa (Bertol.) Briq.
- Stachys recta L. subsp. recta.
- Stachys recta L. subsp. subcrenata (Vis.) Briq.
- Stachys recta L. subsp. tenoreana Bornm.
