= S. grandis =

S. grandis may refer to:

- Schiffermuelleria grandis, a moth species in the genus Schiffermuelleria found in France
- Stypandra grandis, a rhizomatous perennial plant species in the genus Stypandra
- Synaphea grandis, a flowering plant species in the genus Synaphea endemic to Western Australia

== Synonyms ==
- Silybura grandis, a synonym for Uropeltis smithi, a snake species found in India

== See also ==
- Grandis (disambiguation)
