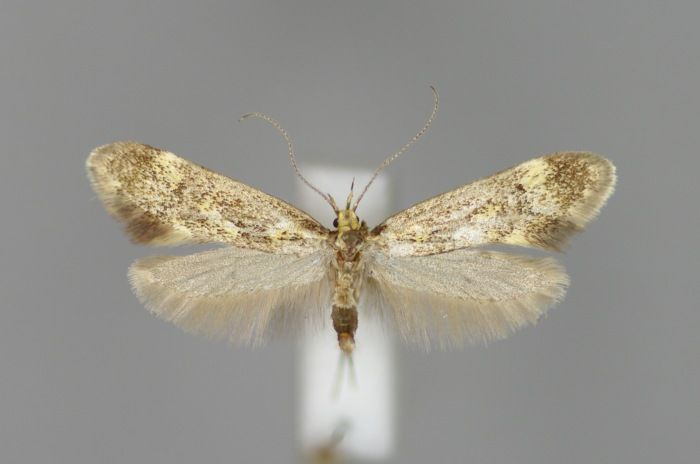

Scientific classification
- Kingdom: Animalia
- Phylum: Arthropoda
- Clade: Pancrustacea
- Class: Insecta
- Order: Lepidoptera
- Family: Oecophoridae
- Subfamily: Oecophorinae
- Tribe: Oecophorini
- Genus: Denisia; Hübner, 1825

Type species
- Phalaena stipella Linnaeus, 1758

Synonyms
- Blepharocera Chambers, 1877 (non Agassiz, 1846: preoccupied); Borkhausenia (auct. non Hübner, [1825]: misidentified); Chambersia Riley, 1891

= Denisia =

Genus of moths

Denisia is a genus of the concealer moth family (Oecophoridae). Among these, it belongs to subfamily Oecophorinae. It was originally established as a subgenus of Borkhausenia.

== Selected species ==
Species of Denisia include:

- Denisia albimaculea
- Denisia aragonella (Chrétien, 1903)
- Denisia augustella (Hübner, 1796)
- Denisia caucasiella Lvovsky, 2007
- Denisia coeruleopicta (Christoph, 1888)
- Denisia fiduciella (Rebel, 1935)
- Denisia fuscicapitella Huemer, 2001
- Denisia graslinella (Staudinger, 1871)
- Denisia haydenella (Chambers, 1877)
- Denisia luctuosella (Duponchel, 1840)
- Denisia luticiliella (Erschoff, 1877)
- Denisia muellerrutzi (Amsel, 1939)
- Denisia nubilosella (Herrich-Schäffer, 1854)
- Denisia obscurella (Brandt, 1937) (formerly in Buvatina)
- Denisia pyrenaica Leraut, 1989
- Denisia ragonotella (Constant, 1885)
- Denisia rhaetica (Frey, 1856)
- Denisia similella
- Denisia stipella (Linnaeus, 1758)
- Denisia stroemella (Fabricius, 1779) (formerly in Buvatina)
- Denisia subaquilea (Stainton, 1849)
- Denisia yukonella Lvovsky, 2007
