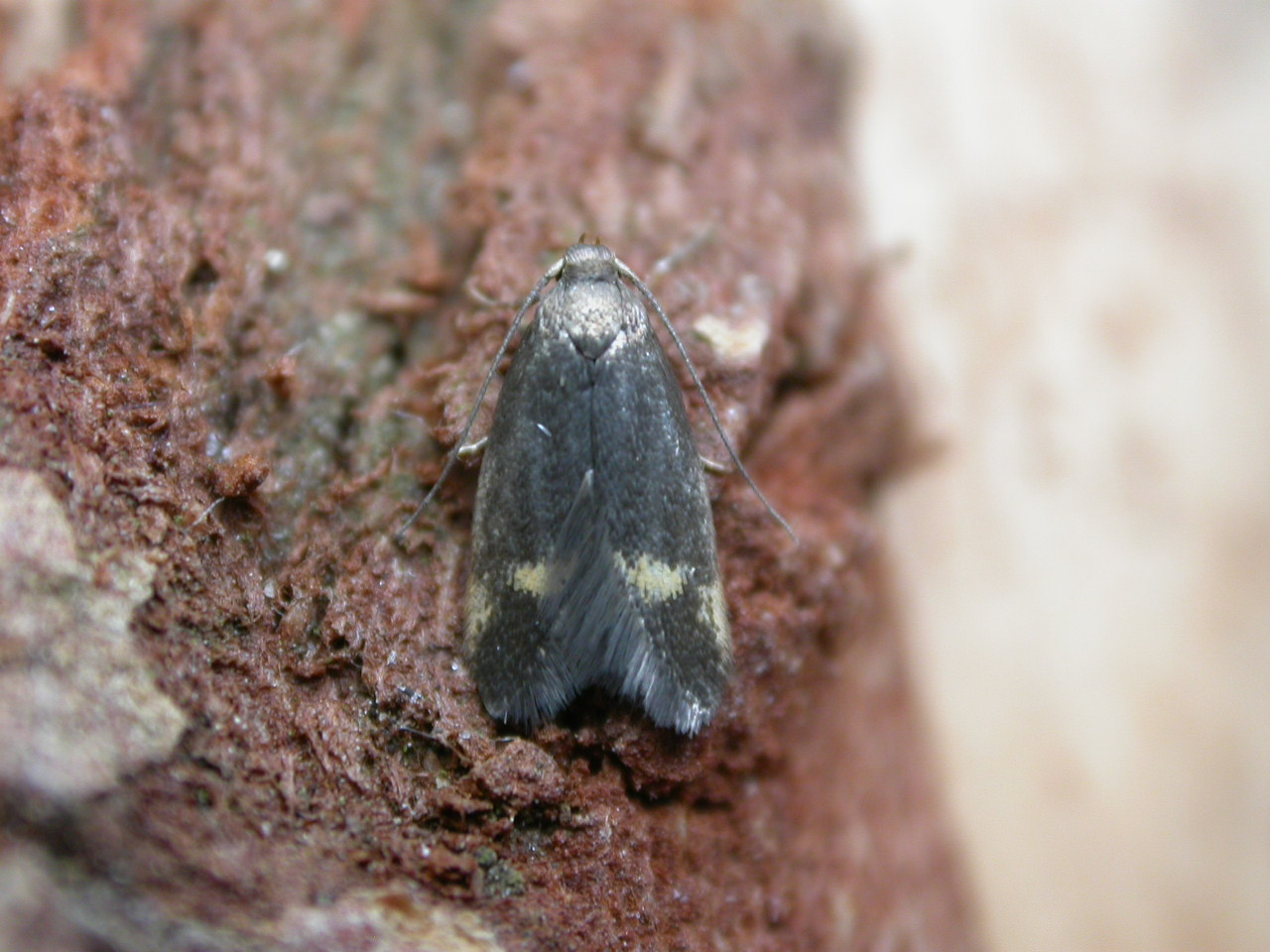
- Adult B. minutella, Hellerup, Denmark

Scientific classification
- Kingdom: Animalia
- Phylum: Arthropoda
- Clade: Pancrustacea
- Class: Insecta
- Order: Lepidoptera
- Family: Oecophoridae
- Subfamily: Oecophorinae
- Genus: Borkhausenia; Hübner, [1825]

Type species
- Phalaena minutella Linnaeus, 1758

Synonyms
- Amaurosetia Stephens, 1835

= Borkhausenia =

Genus of moths

Borkhausenia is a genus of the concealer moth family (Oecophoridae) described by Jacob Hübner in 1825. Among these, it belongs to subfamily Oecophorinae, wherein it is probably closely related to Hofmannophila (brown house moth). In the past, several other Oecophoridae (e.g. Schiffermuelleria) have been included in Borkhausenia, as well as a few even more distant members of the superfamily Gelechioidea. Metalampra was originally described as a subgenus of Borkhausenia. Telechrysis has also been included here as a subgenus by some, while other authors have considered it a separate genus in the Oecophorinae or – if these are also considered distinct – the Amphisbatinae.

== Species ==
In alphabetical order:

- Borkhausenia albipectinata Turner, 1933 (Queensland, Australia)
- Borkhausenia asparta Meyrick, 1906 (New South Wales, West Australia)
- Borkhausenia aurivitella Zerny, 1935 (Morocco)
- Borkhausenia bedeella Lucas, 1950 (Tunisia)
- Borkhausenia bryotrophoides (Zeller, 1877) (Colombia)
- Borkhausenia catochopis Meyrick, 1920 (Queensland, Australia)
- Borkhausenia centrosticha Turner, 1933 (Victoria, Australia)
- Borkhausenia cnecocrana Turner, 1933 (New South Wales, Australia)
- Borkhausenia commixta Meyrick, 1928 (Peru)
- Borkhausenia confarreatella (Zeller, 1877) (Colombia)
- Borkhausenia crimnodes Meyrick, 1912 (Argentina)
- Borkhausenia diaxesta Meyrick, 1922 (Queensland, Australia)
- Borkhausenia dolosella (Walker, 1863) (New South Wales & Victoria, Australia)
- Borkhausenia einsleri Amsel, 1935 (Palestine)
- Borkhausenia eurrhoa (Meyrick, 1886) (Australia including Tasmania)
- Borkhausenia falklandensis Bradley, 1965 (Falkland Islands)
- Borkhausenia fuscescens (Haworth, 1828) (northeast and central Europe)
- Borkhausenia gelechiella (Wocke, 1889) (Sicily) (tentatively placed here)
- Borkhausenia gredoensis Rebel, 1937 (Spain)
- Borkhausenia gypsomicta Turner, 1933 (Queensland, Australia)
- Borkhausenia gypsopleura Turner, 1916 (West Australia)
- Borkhausenia hypochalca (Meyrick, 1886) (Australia including Tasmania)
- Borkhausenia incolorella (Constant, 1890) (southern France)
- Borkhausenia lagara (Meyrick, 1886) (Queensland & New South Wales, Australia)
- Borkhausenia leptophylla Turner, 1933 (Queensland, Australia)
- Borkhausenia liacta Meyrick, 1920 (Queensland, Australia)
- Borkhausenia longipalpis Meyrick, 1931 (Argentina)
- Borkhausenia luridicomella (Herrich-Schäffer, 1856) (Europe)
- Borkhausenia lymphatica (Meyrick, 1886) (Australia including Tasmania)
- Borkhausenia macroptera Turner, 1916 (New South Wales, Australia)
- Borkhausenia megaloplaca (Lower, 1900) (New South Wales, Australia)
- Borkhausenia minnetta (Butler, 1883) (Chile)
- Borkhausenia minutella (Linnaeus, 1758) (Europe)
- Borkhausenia misella Turner, 1933 (Queensland, Australia)
- Borkhausenia nefrax Hodges, 1974 (US states of Arizona, New Mexico, California, Colorado)
- Borkhausenia nigripuncta Turner, 1933 (Australia including Tasmania)
- Borkhausenia nubifera (Meyrick, 1886) (New South Wales & Queensland, Australia)
- Borkhausenia nyctora Meyrick, 1915 (New South Wales, Australia)
- Borkhausenia oenopa (Meyrick, 1886) (South Australia)
- Borkhausenia praesul Meyrick, 1931 (Argentina)
- Borkhausenia predotai Hartig, 1936 (southwestern Europe)
- Borkhausenia reprobata Meyrick, 1920 (Queensland, Australia)
- Borkhausenia sakaiella Matsumura, 1931 (Japan)
- Borkhausenia sensilis Meyrick, 1928 (Peru)
- Borkhausenia sordida (Staudinger, 1880) (Asia Minor)
- Borkhausenia sphaleropis Meyrick, 1902 (Victoria, Australia)
- Borkhausenia splendidella Amsel, 1935 (Palestine)
- Borkhausenia subarctica Strand, 1919 (Norway)
- Borkhausenia syrmeutis Meyrick, 1931 (Argentina)
- Borkhausenia taractis Meyrick, 1915 (New South Wales, Australia)
- Borkhausenia thetias (Meyrick, 1886) (New South Wales, Australia)
- Borkhausenia thorencella (Millière, 1875) (southern France)
- Borkhausenia trigutta (Christoph, 1888) (Armenia)
- Borkhausenia tyropis Meyrick, 1935 (Formosa)
- Borkhausenia venturellii Constantini, 1923 (Italian Apennines) (tentatively placed here)
- Borkhausenia zophodes (Meyrick, 1886) (New South Wales, Australia)

== Selected former species ==
- Borkhausenia intumescens Meyrick, 1921 (southern Africa)
