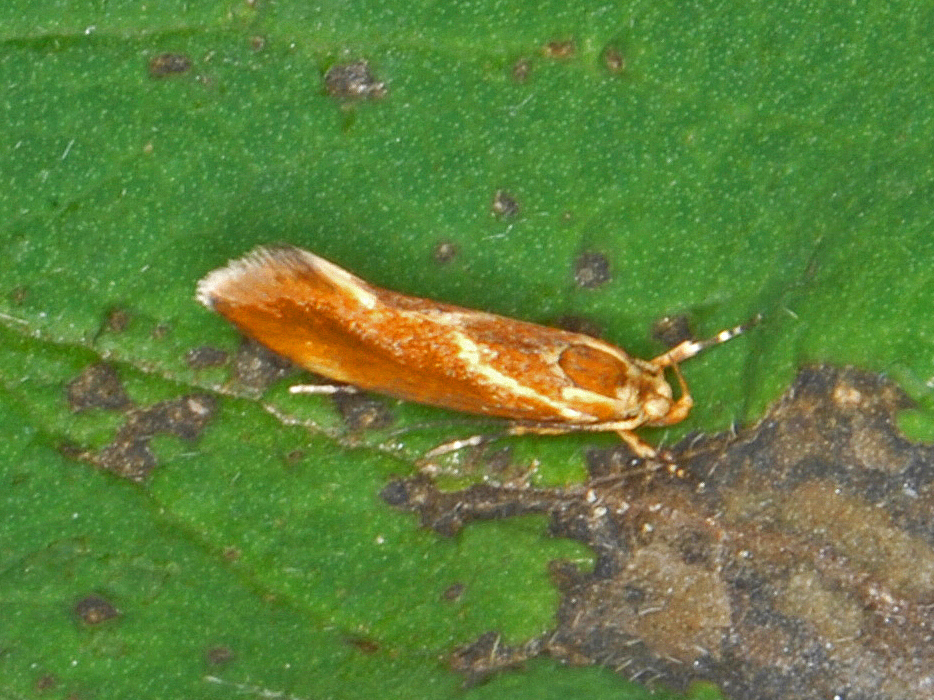

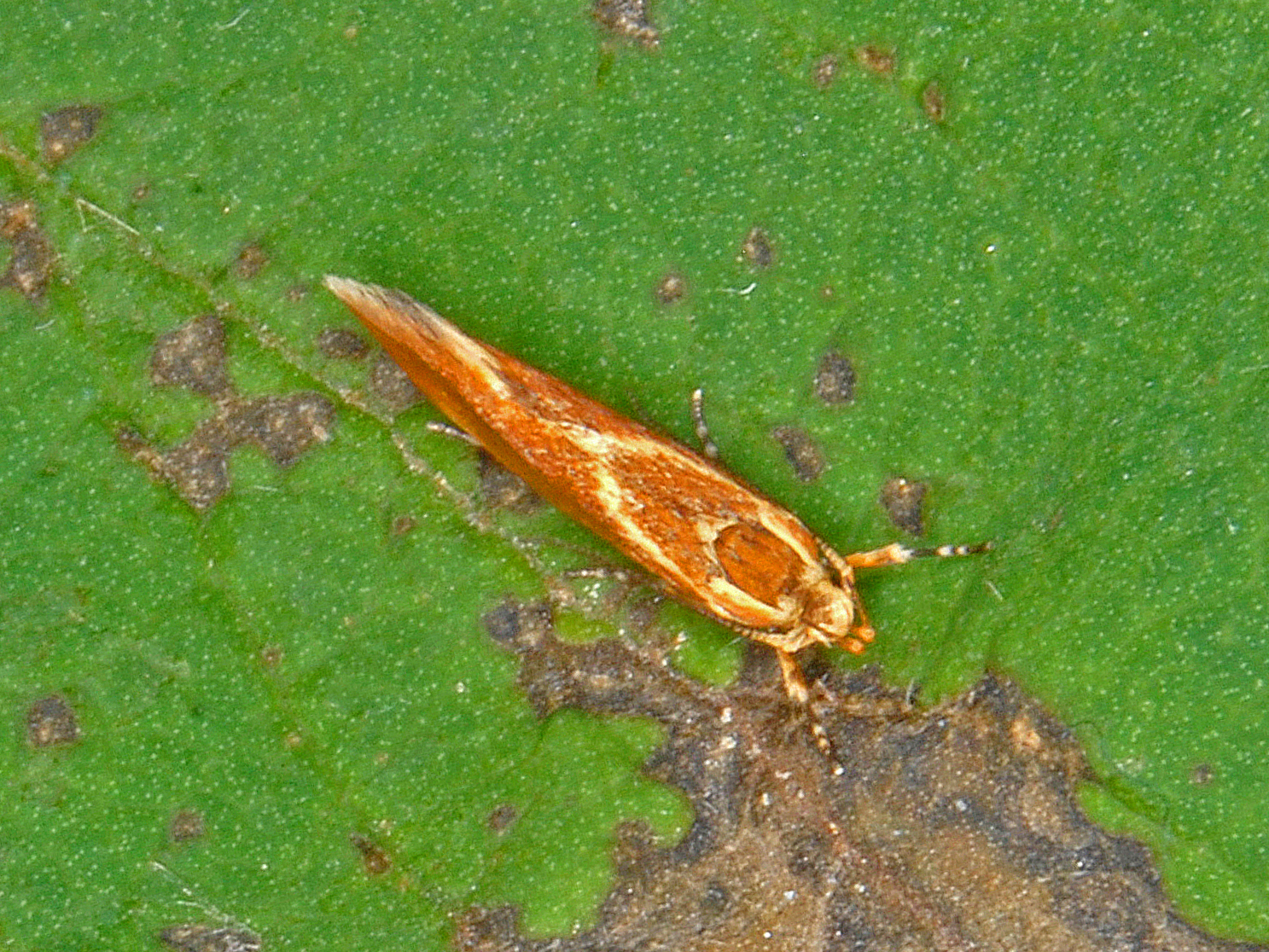
- Dorsal view

Scientific classification
- Kingdom: Animalia
- Phylum: Arthropoda
- Clade: Pancrustacea
- Class: Insecta
- Order: Lepidoptera
- Family: Oecophoridae
- Genus: Metalampra
- Species: M. italica

Binomial name
- Metalampra italica Baldizzone, 1977

= Metalampra italica =

Species of moth

Metalampra italica is a moth of the family Oecophoridae that was until recently considered endemic to Italy, from which it was originally described in 1977 by Giorgio Baldizzone, but that is now also known to occur in other European countries.

== Distribution ==
Although Fauna Europaea mentioned the species only from Italy as recent as 2013, it is clear that the species has been present further north much earlier.

In 2003, the species was discovered in Devon, after which the species has also been encountered in multiple other counties in the south of England and Wales. The species has also recently been recorded in Croatia, Germany, France, the Netherlands—where it was first caught in 1985, but misidentified as Metalampra cinnamomea — Switzerland and Belgium and appears to be spreading its range.

Specimen of M. italica are sometimes mislabelled as the more widespread species Metalampra cinnamomea, from which it differs in ground colour of the forewing. It is not clear whether M. italica has recently spread to Central Europe or if its presence there had merely so far remained unnoticed, at least in part due to misidentification of specimens as M. cinnamomea. Multiple occurrences of such misidentification in collections have been confirmed.

== Habitat ==
This species occurs in forest environments, preferably in deciduous forest.

== Appearance ==
The wingspan of Metalampra italica can reach 10–14 mm. These moths have bright reddish brown forewings with contrasting pale yellow longitudinal stripes on the sides and on the thorax. Antennae are dark brown with light rings. Hindwings are greyish.

The species appears somewhat similar to Metalampra cinnamomea, but fresh specimens can be distinguished by the ground colour of the forewing. Both species have a shade of brown as ground colour, but that of M. italica is a more red brown, whereas M. cinnamomea has a greyish brown. The ground colour of M. italica is also lighter than that of M. cinnamomea. As a result, the yellow markings on the forewings appear more pronounced on M. cinnamomea. The species can also be distinguished by their genitalia.

== Behaviour and host plants ==
The larvae feed in decaying wood, usually Quercus spp., beneath the bark and near several species of fungus, where they weave a loose web. It is unclear whether the larvae's food source is the wood, bark, fungi or a mixture thereof. Larvae are found from autumn to May, as well as in July. Adults occur from late May to July, and again in August. They fly both day and night and comes to light.
