= Denisia albimaculea =

Scientific classification
- Kingdom: Animalia
- Phylum: Arthropoda
- Clade: Pancrustacea
- Class: Insecta
- Order: Lepidoptera
- Family: Oecophoridae
- Genus: Denisia
- Species: D. albimaculea

Binomial name
- Denisia albimaculea (Haworth, 1828)

Species of moth

Denisia albimaculea is a moth of the family Oecophoridae. It is found in Europe.

The wingspan is 9–12 mm. The moth flies from May to June depending on the location.

The larvae live under and feed on dead bark, decayed wood and amongst other plant material from conifers such as Larix and deciduous trees such as Ulmus and Aesculus.
