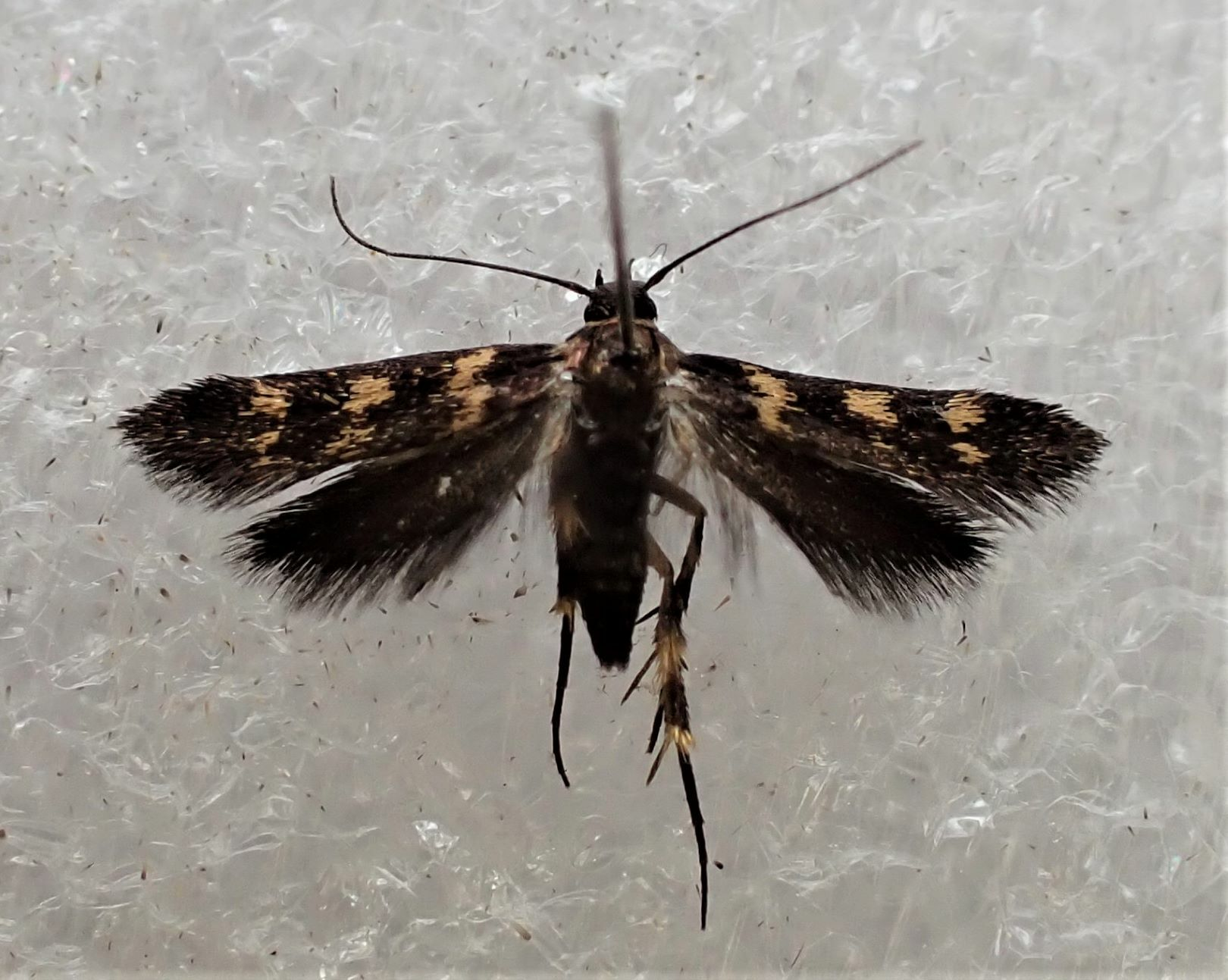

Conservation status
- Nationally Critical (NZ TCS)

Scientific classification
- Kingdom: Animalia
- Phylum: Arthropoda
- Class: Insecta
- Order: Lepidoptera
- Family: Oecophoridae
- Subfamily: Oecophorinae
- Genus: Schiffermuelleria
- Species: S. orthophanes

Binomial name
- Schiffermuelleria orthophanes (Meyrick, 1905)

Synonyms
- Compsistis orthophanes Meyrick, 1905

= Schiffermuelleria orthophanes =

Species of moth

Schiffermuelleria orthophanes is a moth of the family Oecophoridae. It is endemic to New Zealand. It is classified as critically endangered by the Department of Conservation.

== Taxonomy ==
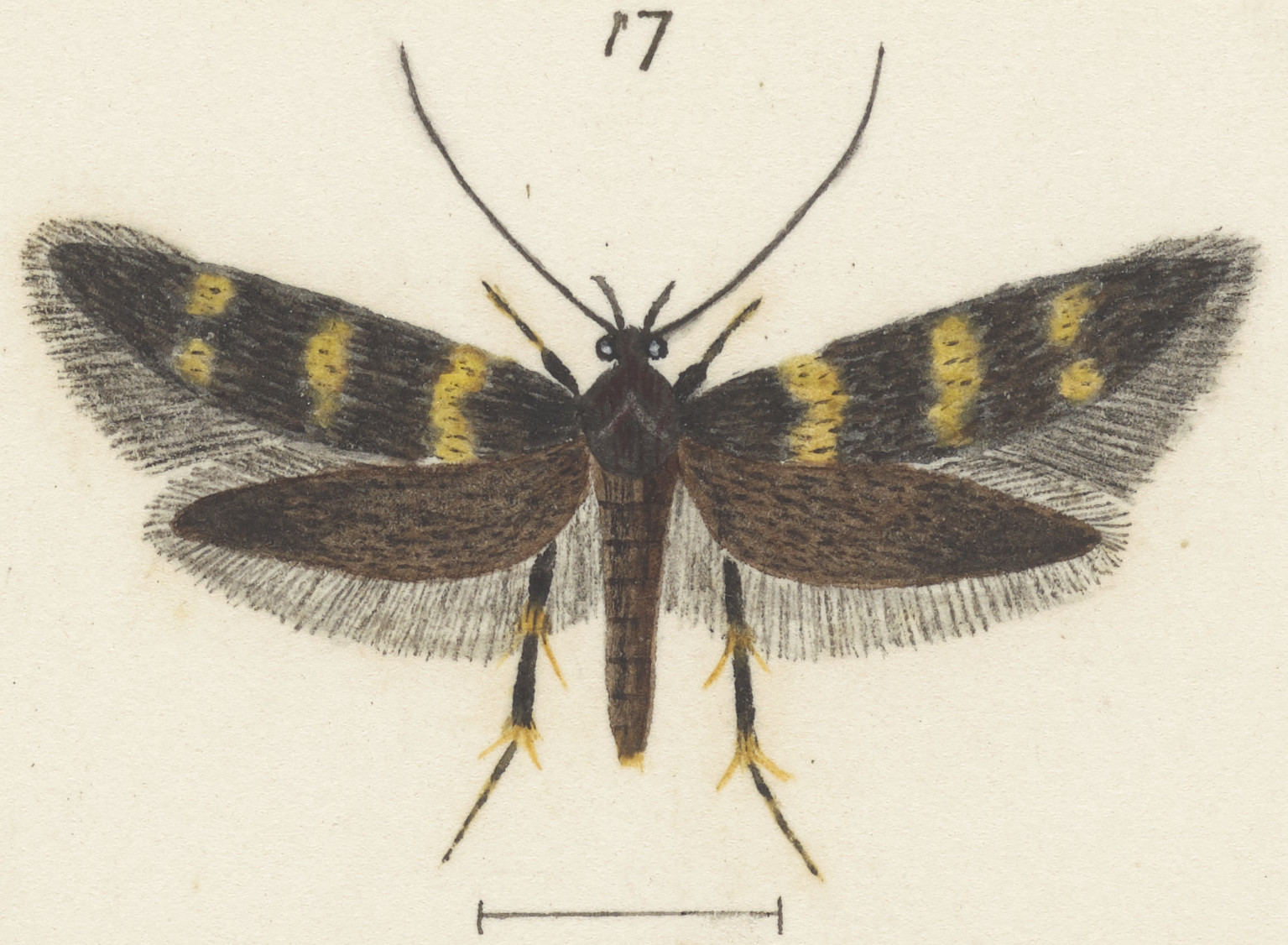
Illustration of male

In 1905 Edward Meyrick described this species and named it Compsistis orthophanes. He used specimens he collected in Nelson and Auckland in December and January. The type specimen is held at the Natural History Museum, London. Meyrick subsequently placed it within the European genus Schiffermuelleria with George Vernon Hudson discussing the species under this name in 1928. This endemic New Zealand species likely belongs to a separate genus. Robert J. B. Hoare has proposed a Hierodoris group to include this species but further work is needed to determine the correct genus in which to place this moth. As such the species is currently also known as Schiffermuelleria (s.l.) orthophanes.

== Description ==
Meyrick described the species as follows:

9-10 mm. Head, antennae, and thorax dark bronzy-fuscous. Palpi rather dark fuscous, internally whitish-ochreous, terminal joint as long as second. Abdomen dark fuscous, apex whitish-ochreous. Fore-wings elongate, narrow, costa gently arched, apex round-pointed, termen very obliquely rounded; fuscous, slightly purplish-tinged, irrorated with dark fuscous and blackish; a straight rather narrow fascia at 1/4, a small spot in middle of disc, and opposite subcostal and subdorsal spots at 3/4 pale ochreous-yellow, irregular-edged : cilia fuscous, mixed with dark fuscous towards base. Hind-wings dark fuscous; cilia fuscous, with dark fuscous basal shade.

== Distribution ==
This species is endemic to New Zealand. It has been collected in Auckland, Waimarino, Wellington, North Brother Island, Stephens Island, Nelson, and Southland.

== Biology and habitat ==
Little is known of the biology of this species. It has been hypothesised that larvae may subsist on litter or twigs. The adult moths appear from September to March. Hudson noted that, although previously regarded as rare, in the years surrounding 1928 the species had become more common. Earlier records indicate the species inhabited modified and suburban localities.

== Conservation status ==
In 2017 this moth was classified under the New Zealand Threat Classification system as being Nationally Critical and data poor.
