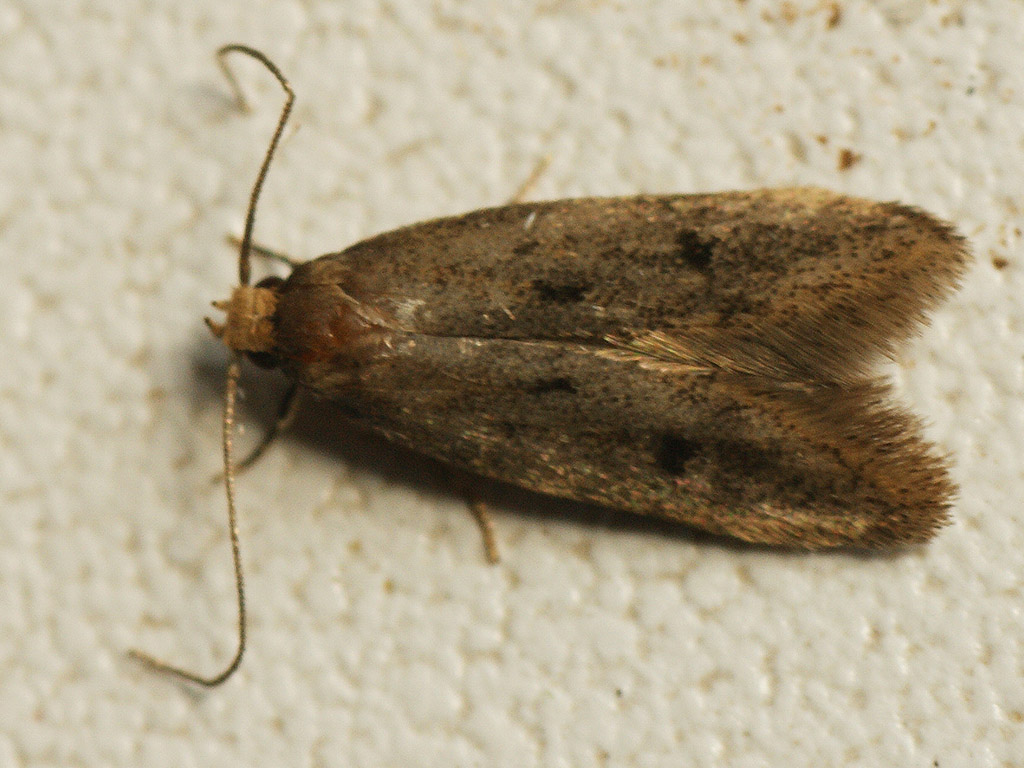

Scientific classification
- Kingdom: Animalia
- Phylum: Arthropoda
- Class: Insecta
- Order: Lepidoptera
- Family: Oecophoridae
- Genus: Borkhausenia
- Species: B. luridicomella

Binomial name
- Borkhausenia luridicomella (Herrich-Schäffer, 1856)

Synonyms
- Lampros luridicomella Herrich-Schäffer, 1856

= Borkhausenia luridicomella =

Species of moth

Borkhausenia luridicomella is a moth of the family Oecophoridae. It was described by Gottlieb August Wilhelm Herrich-Schäffer in 1856. It is found from Scandinavia south to Italy and Romania and from the Benelux, Germany and Switzerland east to Russia.

The wingspan is 9–13 mm. Adults are on wing from May to August.

The larvae probably live under the bark of fallen wood of deciduous and evergreen trees. It has also been found in bird nests.
