= Borkhausenia crimnodes =

Scientific classification
- Kingdom: Animalia
- Phylum: Arthropoda
- Class: Insecta
- Order: Lepidoptera
- Family: Oecophoridae
- Genus: Borkhausenia
- Species: B. crimnodes

Binomial name
- Borkhausenia crimnodes Meyrick, 1912

Synonyms
- Borkhausenia intumescens Meyrick, 1921

Species of moth

Borkhausenia crimnodes is a species of moth from the family Oecophoridae. The scientific name of this species was published for the first time in 1912 by Edward Meyrick. It is found in the Southern Hemisphere, where it has been recorded from Argentina, South Africa and Portugal.

The wingspan is 11–12 mm. The forewings are whitish-ochreous, suffusedly irrorated with fuscous. The basal third is suffused with dark fuscous, except for a small clear whitish-ochreous spot in the middle of the base. There are more or less clear whitish-ochreous blotches on the costa at two-fifths and two-thirds, the space between these suffused with dark fuscous. The discal stigmata are represented by round blotches of dark fuscous suffusion, with a similar blotch more or less developed between these, separated by pale spaces. There is more or less dark fuscous suffusion towards the median area of the dorsum and the apical fourth of the wing is dark fuscous, extending to the tornus. The hindwings are light grey.

The larval host plant is unknown, but is likely to be some sort of dry plant matter or debris, perhaps affected by mould or other fungi.
