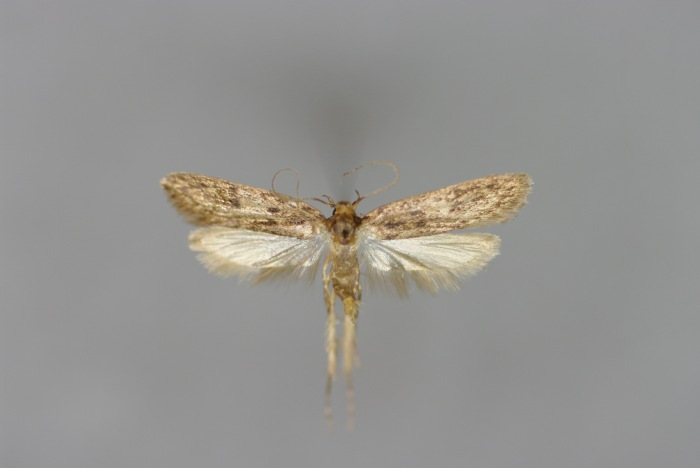
- Male
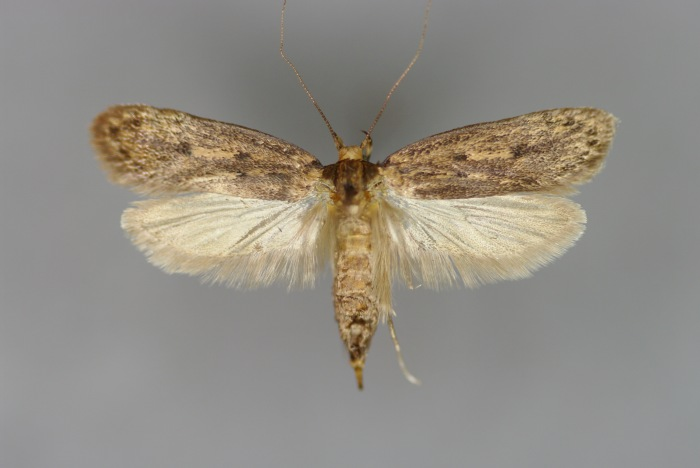
- Female

Scientific classification
- Kingdom: Animalia
- Phylum: Arthropoda
- Clade: Pancrustacea
- Class: Insecta
- Order: Lepidoptera
- Family: Oecophoridae
- Genus: Hofmannophila; Spuler, 1910
- Species: H. pseudospretella

Binomial name
- Hofmannophila pseudospretella (Stainton, 1849)

= Hofmannophila =

Brown house moth

Genus of moth

Hofmannophila is a genus of moths in the concealer moth family Oecophoridae. It is monotypic, with the single species Hofmannophila pseudospretella, the brown house moth, which appears to be closely related to species of the genus Borkhausenia.

== Description ==
=== Egg ===
The egg is elliptical with parallel longitudinal grooves joined by fine transverse lines. The colour ranges from shining white to yellow.

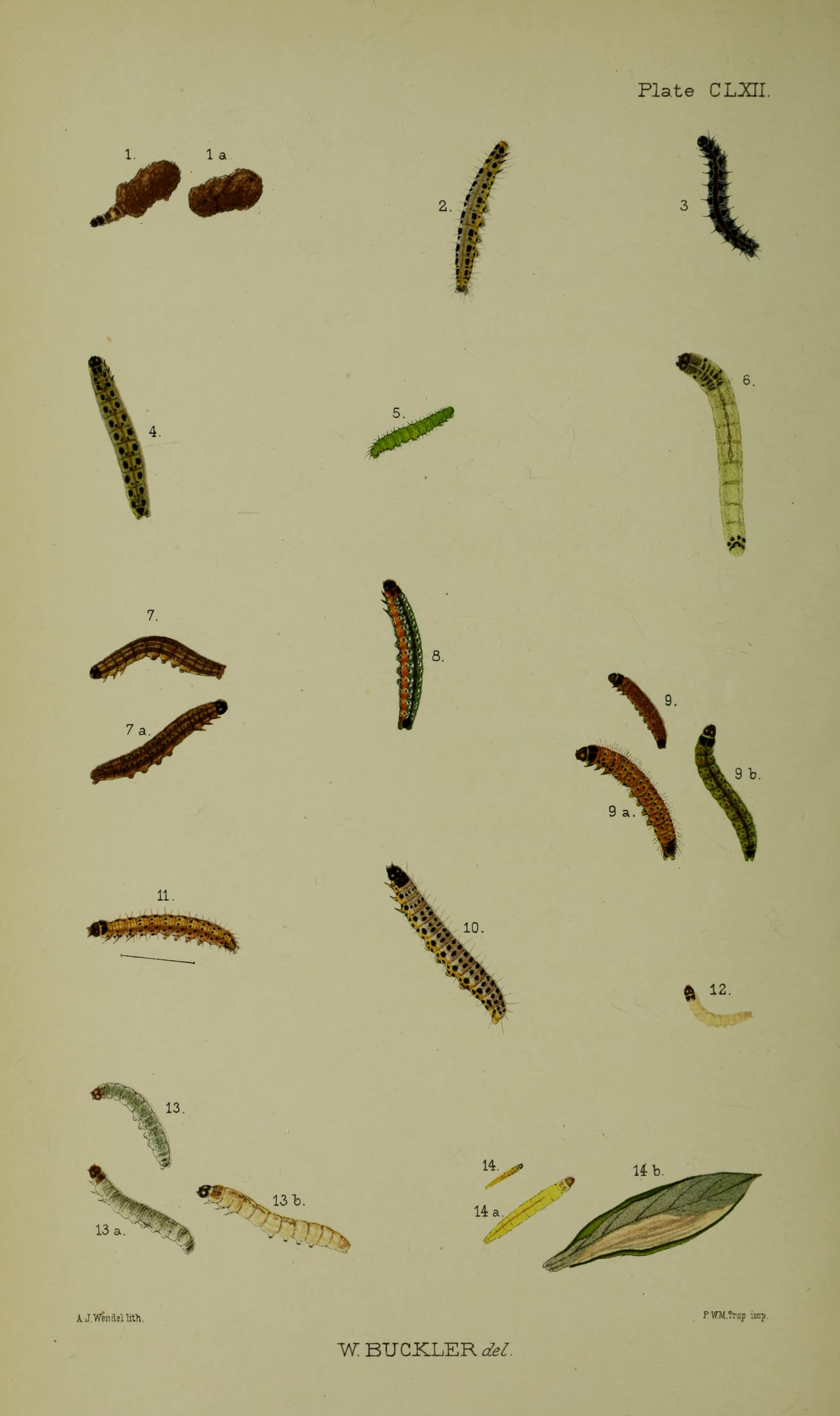
Figs. 13, 13a, 13b larvae in various stages of growth

=== Larvae ===
Larvae have a brown head with a translucent dull white body and pale yellowish-brown legs. Because of the translucency of the body, it may change colour depending on gut content, in turn dependent on the colour of the fabrics ingested.

=== Pupa ===
The pupa is yellowish brown and composed of strongly hooked setae on terminal abdominal body segments.

=== Adults ===
Mature individuals have pale ochre forewings interspersed with blackish brown patches. Each wing has a prominent discal spot and smaller blackish brown cellular spots. The hindwing is brownish grey, while the head, thorax, and abdomen dark grey-brown. Antennae are simple and threadlike. Wing span is 15 – 26 mm.

== Distribution and habitat ==
This species was introduced from Asia to Europe and other continents in the 1840s. It is now found almost worldwide and is especially common in Britain. This is a synanthropic species that lives in private houses and commercial buildings. Smaller numbers of individuals also occur outside human settings, with larvae being found in birds’ nests, feeding on droppings and detritus.

== Reproduction and life history ==
Usually up to 260 ova are laid by a female during one life cycle, either singly or in batches. Large females have been reported to lay 400 – 500 ova. Under favourable conditions, eggs hatch 10 – 20 days after being laid.

Larvae are active June – April, during which they spin silken tubes with the food they eat, leaving behind deposits of frass and silk. They require relatively high humidity for successful development to maturity, and the duration of their pupal stage is shortened by a higher ambient temperature. Although they can enter diapause under unfavourable conditions, they are killed by severe frost. Before pupation, larvae leave their natal feeding site and may travel for 2 – 3 days before finding a new suitable place to pupate.

Adults are active May – September, although they can be found all year round in heated buildings. They are especially attracted to light and can fly all year round. The mite species Cheyletus eruditus appears to be a significant predator of this moth.

== Pest status ==
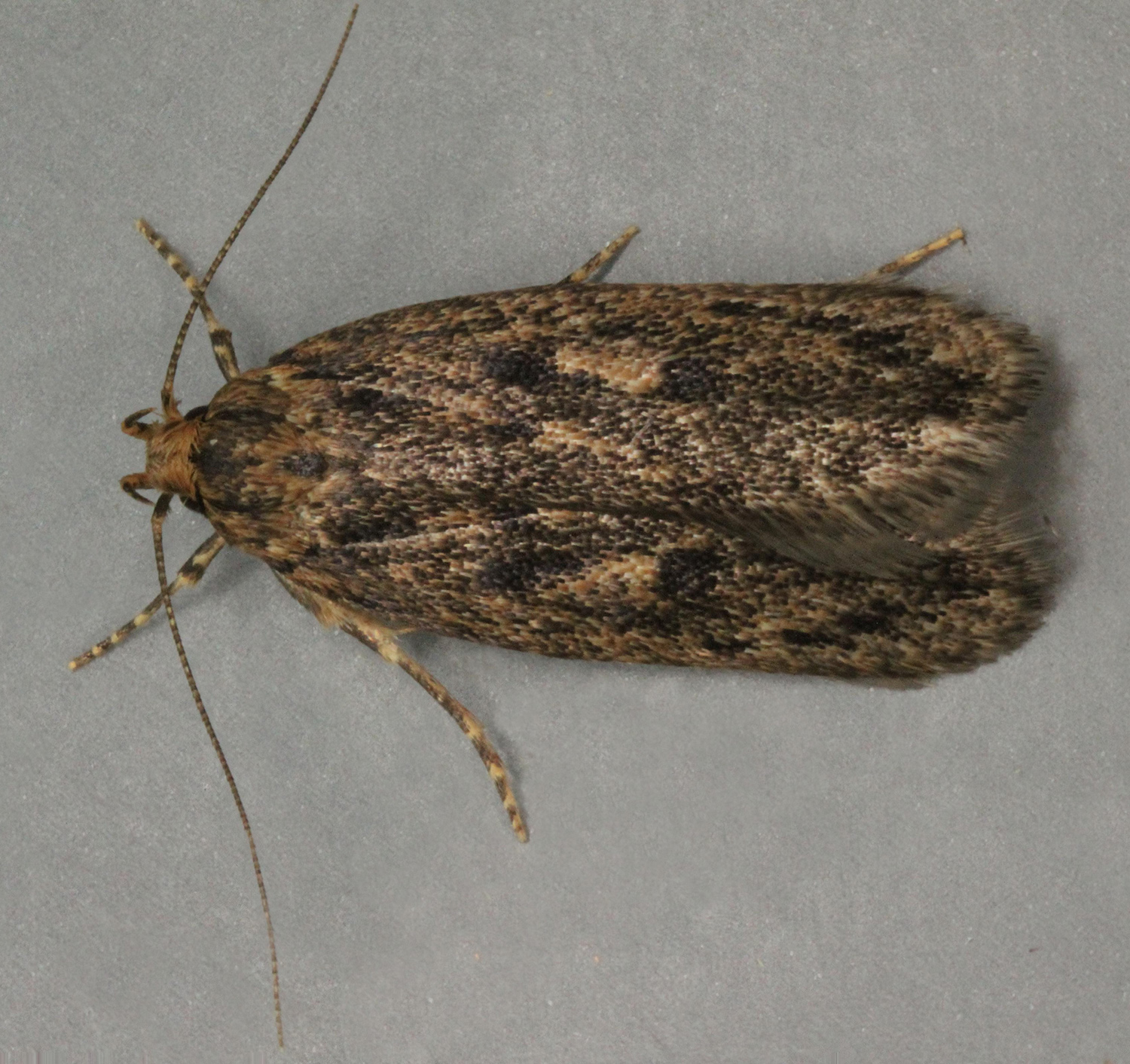

The brown house moth is considered a serious pest in domestic and commercial settings because of the larvae's destructive feeding habits. Larvae feed on various manmade foodstuffs and household materials. These include stored cereals, dried fruit, seeds, clothes and furniture fabric, fur, and wood floor inlays. Other commodities reportedly eaten include book bindings, wine bottle corks and leather. Their destructive power is probably largely attributable to their unusual ability to degrade keratin, which is mediated by lactic acid bacteria present in their midgut. Larvae also bite through synthetic carpet fibres to construct their pupation cells, and since they rarely ingest the fibres, they are little affected by conventional moth-proofing agents. Moreover, this species is reported to be a more serious pest in Britain than elsewhere in the world.
