= Denisia augustella =

Scientific classification
- Kingdom: Animalia
- Phylum: Arthropoda
- Clade: Pancrustacea
- Class: Insecta
- Order: Lepidoptera
- Family: Oecophoridae
- Genus: Denisia
- Species: D. augustella

Binomial name
- Denisia augustella (Hübner, 1796)

Species of moth

Denisia augustella is a species of moth belonging to the family Oecophoridae.

It is native to Europe.
