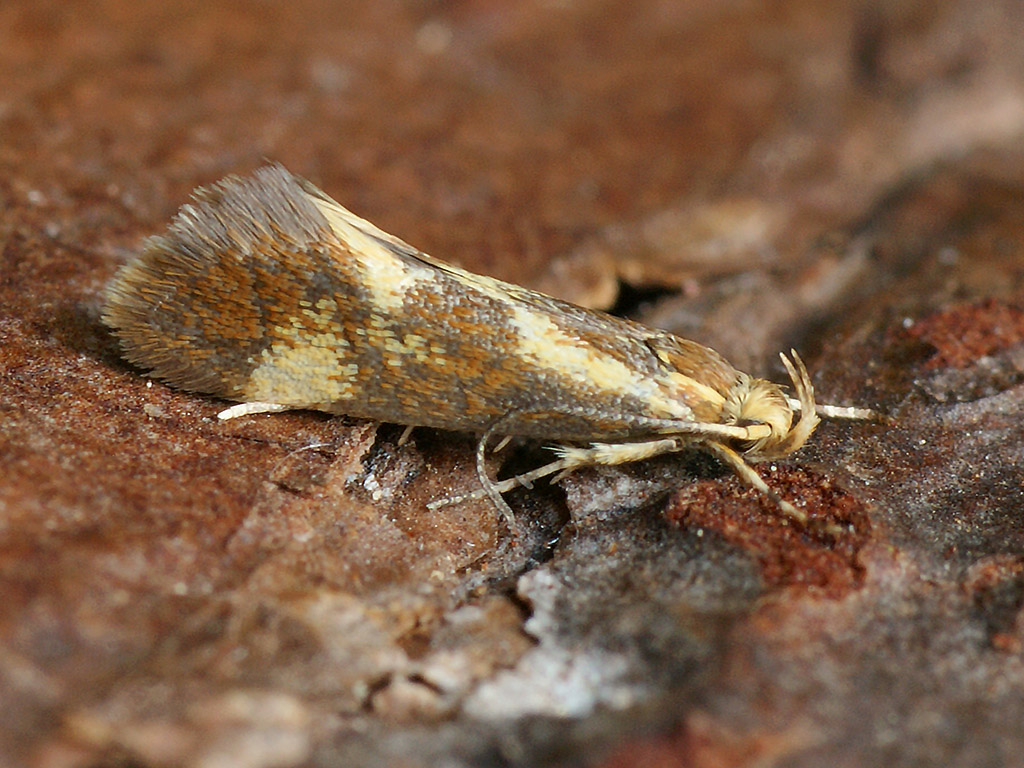
- Metalampra cinnamomea

Scientific classification
- Kingdom: Animalia
- Phylum: Arthropoda
- Clade: Pancrustacea
- Class: Insecta
- Order: Lepidoptera
- Family: Oecophoridae
- Tribe: Oecophorini
- Genus: Metalampra; Toll, 1956

Type species
- Oecophora cinnamomea Zeller, 1839

= Metalampra =

Genus of moths

Metalampra is a genus of the concealer moth family (Oecophoridae). Among these, it belongs to subfamily Oecophorinae. It was originally established as a subgenus of Borkhausenia.

Species of Metalampra include:

- Metalampra cinnamomea (Zeller, 1839)
- Metalampra italica
- Metalampra diminutella (Rebel, 1931)
