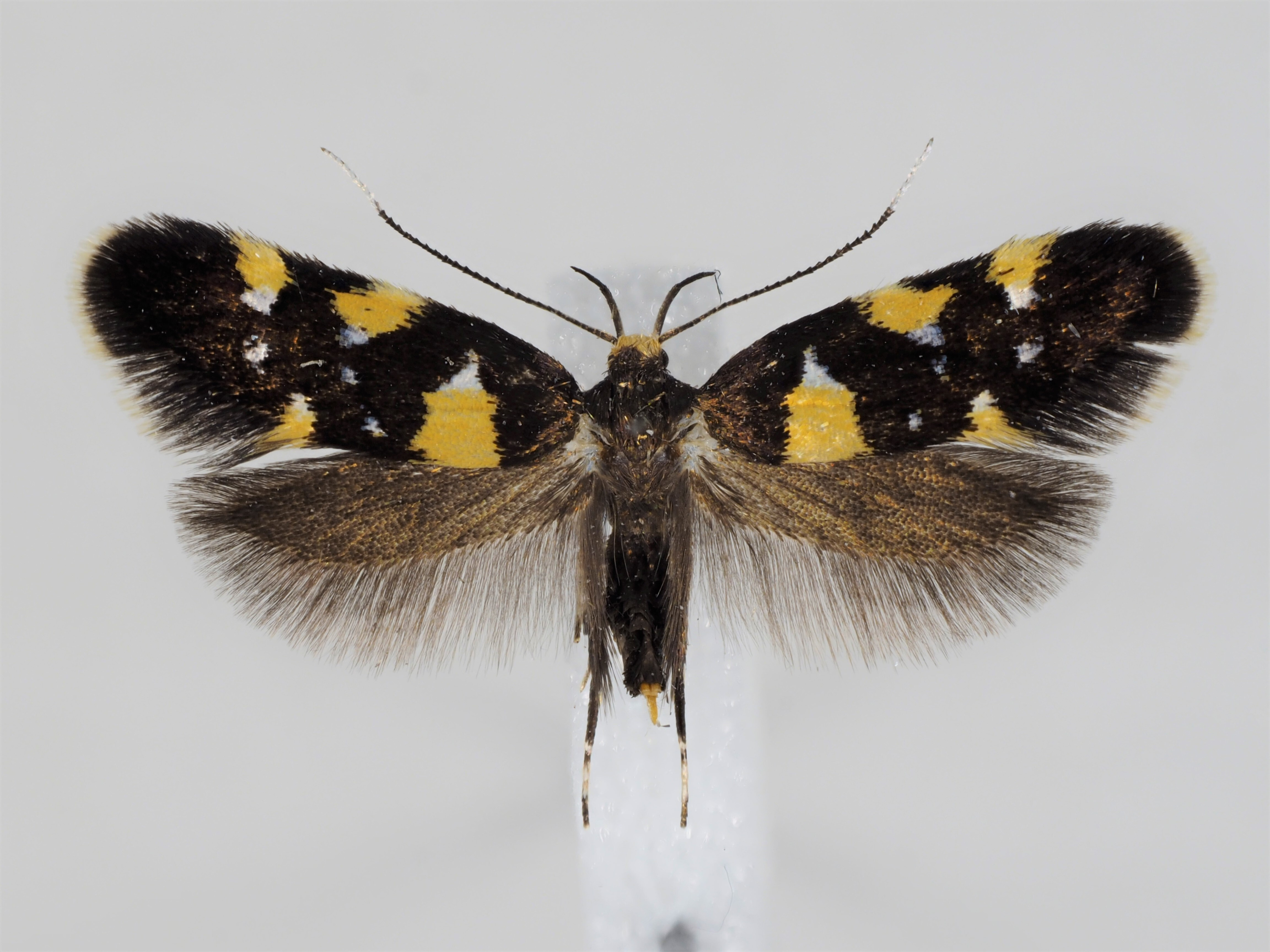

Scientific classification
- Domain: Eukaryota
- Kingdom: Animalia
- Phylum: Arthropoda
- Class: Insecta
- Order: Lepidoptera
- Family: Oecophoridae
- Genus: Denisia
- Species: D. stroemella

Binomial name
- Denisia stroemella (Fabricius, 1779)

Synonyms
- Tinea stroemella Fabricius, 1779; Buvatina stroemella; Borkhausenia stroemella

= Denisia stroemella =

Species of moth

Denisia stroemella is a moth of the family Oecophoridae. It was described by Johan Christian Fabricius in 1779. It is found in northern and central Europe.

The wingspan is 8–15 mm. Adults are on wing from June to August.
