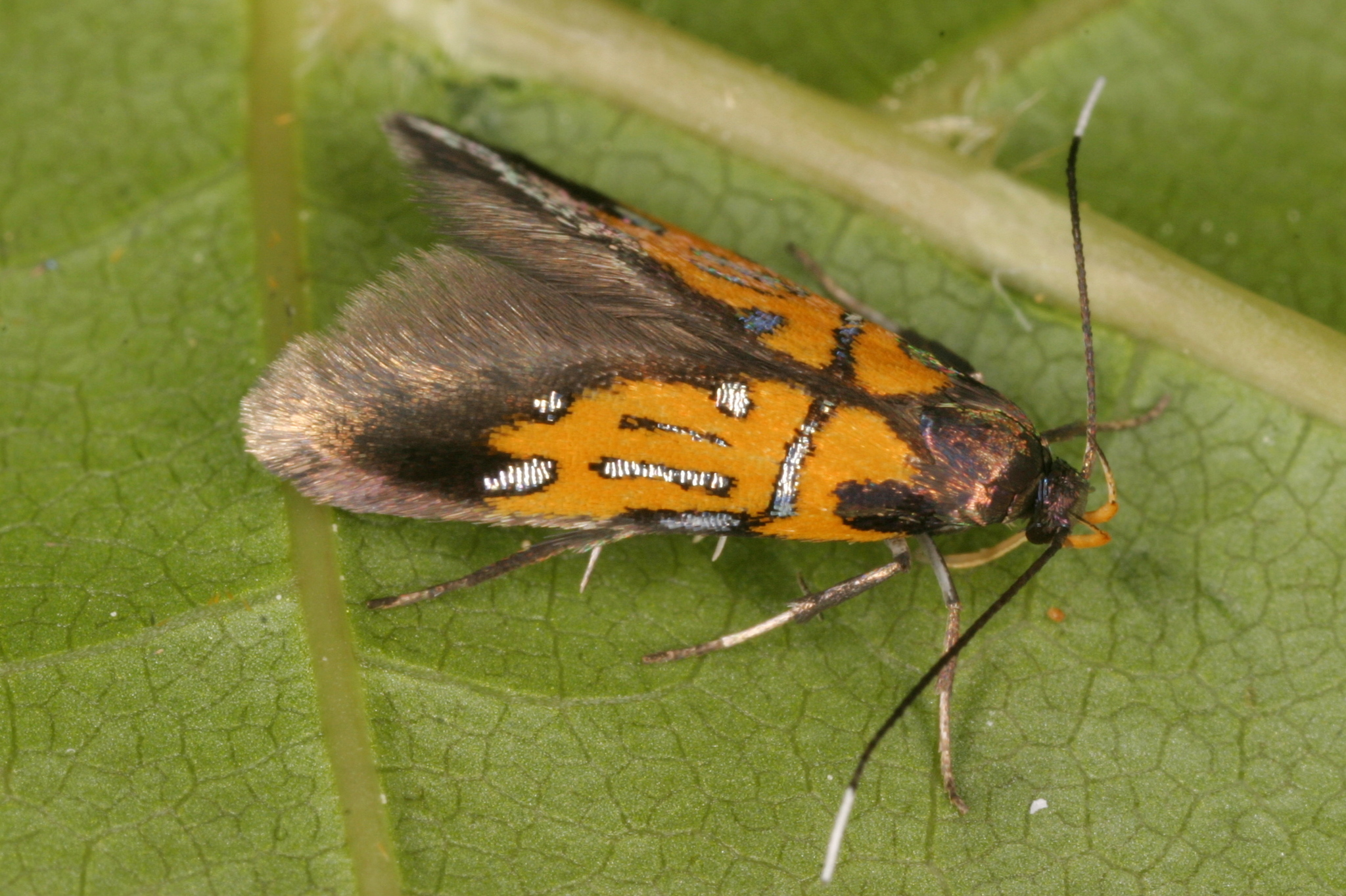
- Schiffermuelleria schaefferella, Germany

Scientific classification
- Kingdom: Animalia
- Phylum: Arthropoda
- Class: Insecta
- Order: Lepidoptera
- Family: Oecophoridae
- Genus: Schiffermuelleria
- Species: S. schaefferella

Binomial name
- Schiffermuelleria schaefferella (Linnaeus, 1758)

Synonyms
- Phalaena schaefferella Linnaeus, 1758

= Schiffermuelleria schaefferella =

Species of moths

Schiffermuelleria schaefferella is a species of concealer moth in the family Oecophoridae. It is found in Europe and western Asia.

The caterpillars of this moth develop in rotting wood, on which they feed.
