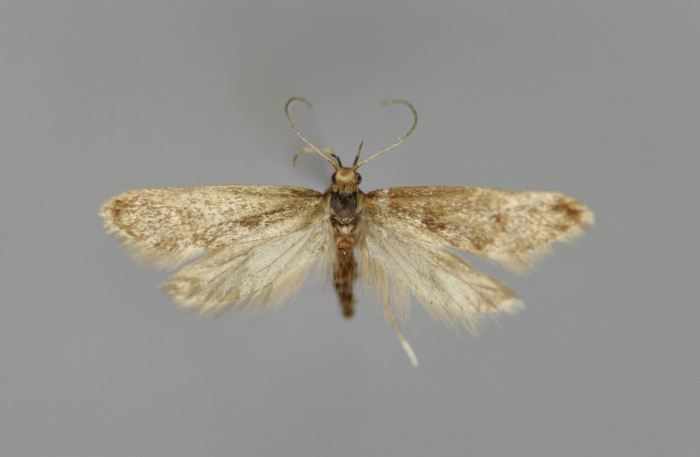
- Male

Scientific classification
- Kingdom: Animalia
- Phylum: Arthropoda
- Class: Insecta
- Order: Lepidoptera
- Family: Oecophoridae
- Genus: Denisia
- Species: D. nubilosella

Binomial name
- Denisia nubilosella (Herrich-Schäffer, 1854)

Synonyms
- Lampros nubilosella Herrich-Schäffer, 1854

= Denisia nubilosella =

Species of moth

Denisia nubilosella is a moth of the family Oecophoridae. It is found in France, Italy, Switzerland, Austria, the Czech Republic, Slovakia, Poland and Romania.

The wingspan is 17 mm.
