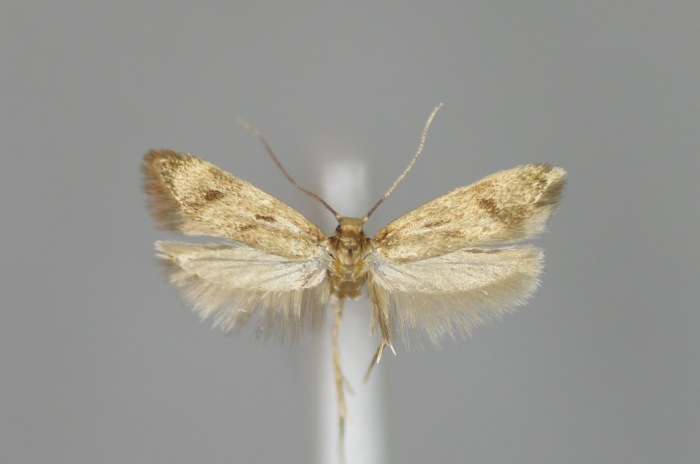

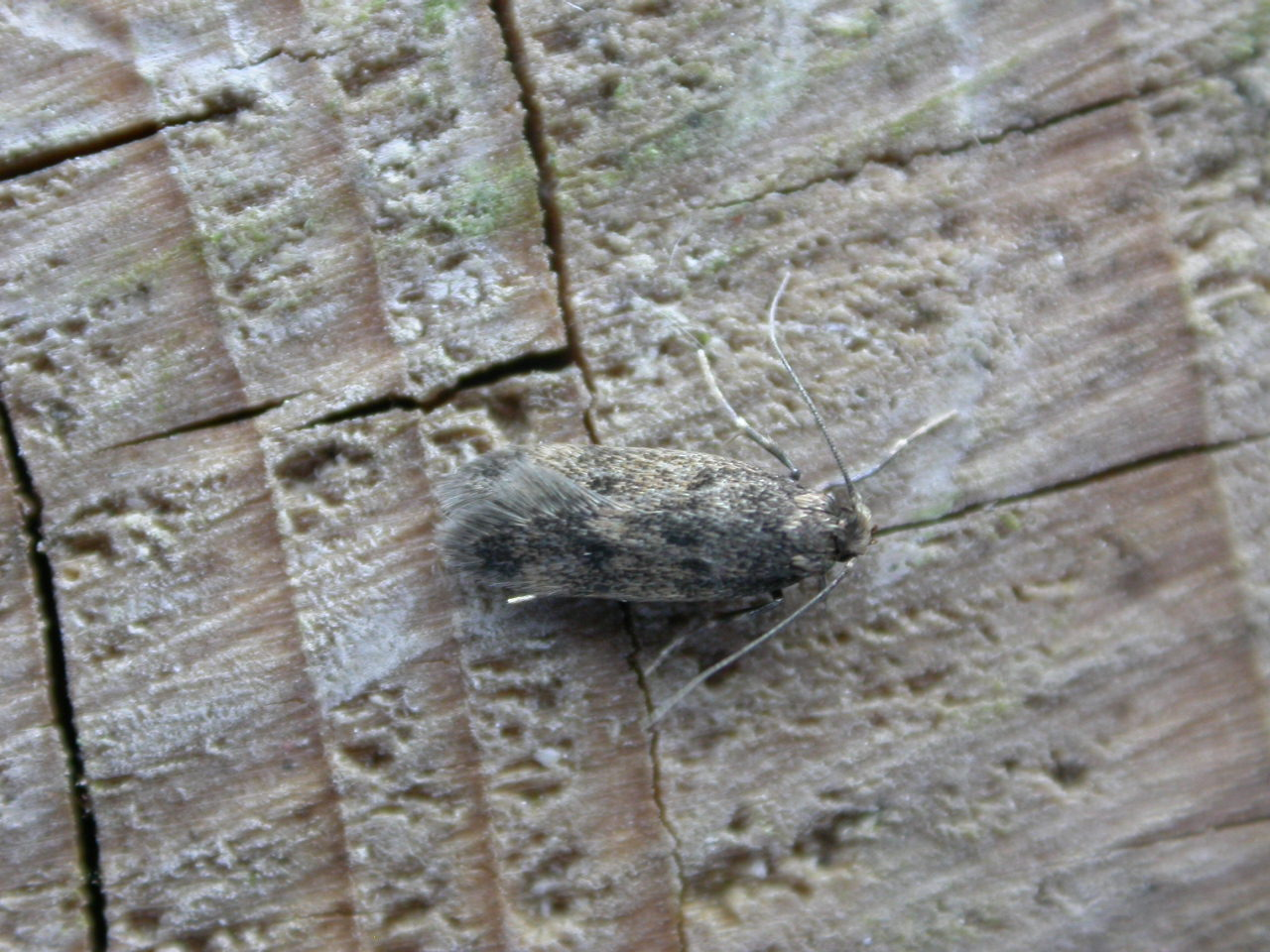

Scientific classification
- Kingdom: Animalia
- Phylum: Arthropoda
- Clade: Pancrustacea
- Class: Insecta
- Order: Lepidoptera
- Family: Oecophoridae
- Genus: Borkhausenia
- Species: B. fuscescens

Binomial name
- Borkhausenia fuscescens (Haworth, 1828)

= Borkhausenia fuscescens =

Species of moth

Borkhausenia fuscescens, commonly known as the Small Dingy Tubic is a moth of the family Oecophoridae. It is found in Europe.

The wingspan is 7–12 mm. The head is rather dark fuscous, face whitish-fuscous. Forewings light fuscous, coarsely irrorated with dark fuscous; stigmata large, dark fuscous, first discal before plical. Hindwings are grey. The moth flies from July to August depending on the location.

The larvae feed on a wide range of dried plant matter such as dead leaves and birds' nests.
