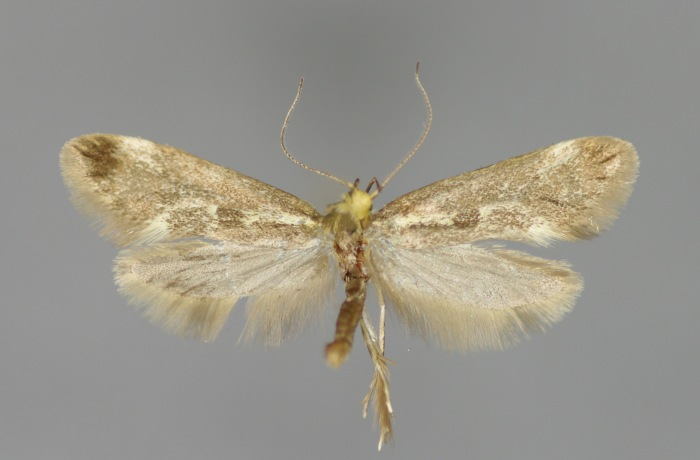
- Male

Scientific classification
- Kingdom: Animalia
- Phylum: Arthropoda
- Class: Insecta
- Order: Lepidoptera
- Family: Oecophoridae
- Genus: Denisia
- Species: D. stipella

Binomial name
- Denisia stipella (Linnaeus, 1758)

Synonyms
- Phalaena stipella Linnaeus, 1758; Lampros westermannella Zetterstedt, 1839

= Denisia stipella =

Species of moth

Denisia stipella is a moth of the family Oecophoridae. It is found in almost all of continental Europe, except the Iberian Peninsula and the southern part of the Balkan Peninsula.

The wingspan is 14–19 mm. Adults are on wing from the end of May to August.

The larvae live under dead bark, in decayed wood and amongst other plant material from conifers such as Abies alba, Picea and Pinus species.
