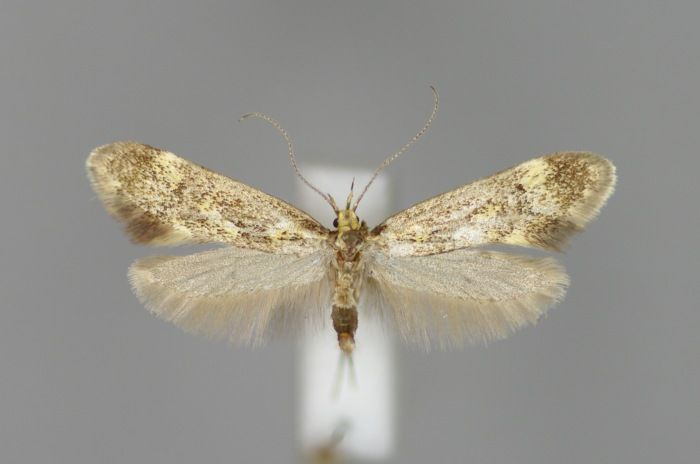

Scientific classification
- Kingdom: Animalia
- Phylum: Arthropoda
- Clade: Pancrustacea
- Class: Insecta
- Order: Lepidoptera
- Family: Oecophoridae
- Genus: Denisia
- Species: D. similella

Binomial name
- Denisia similella (Hübner, 1796)

= Denisia similella =

Species of moth

Denisia similella is a moth of the family Oecophoridae. It is found in Europe.

The wingspan is about 15 mm. The head is ochreous-yellowish, with fuscous central stripe. Forewings dark fuscous; a spot near base, connected with base by a streak, a spot about middle on or near dorsum, a small spot beyond and above this, often connected with it, a spot on costa at 3/4, and sometimes a tornal dot pale yellow. Hindwings under 1, grey.

The moth flies from June to July depending on the location.

The larvae feed on fungus under dead wood or bark.
