= Denisia luticiliella =

Scientific classification
- Domain: Eukaryota
- Kingdom: Animalia
- Phylum: Arthropoda
- Class: Insecta
- Order: Lepidoptera
- Family: Oecophoridae
- Genus: Denisia
- Species: D. luticiliella

Binomial name
- Denisia luticiliella (Erschoff, 1877)

Species of moth

Denisia luticiliella is a species of moth, belonging to the genus Denisia.

It is native to Eastern Europe.
