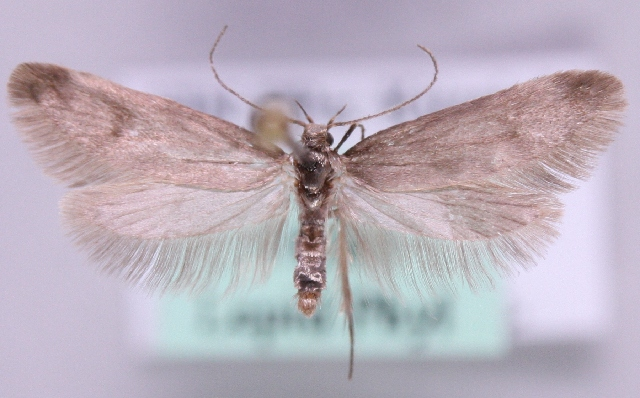

Scientific classification
- Kingdom: Animalia
- Phylum: Arthropoda
- Clade: Pancrustacea
- Class: Insecta
- Order: Lepidoptera
- Family: Oecophoridae
- Genus: Denisia
- Species: D. obscurella

Binomial name
- Denisia obscurella (Brandt, 1937)

Synonyms
- Borkhausenia obscurella Brandt, 1937; Buvatina obscurella

= Denisia obscurella =

Species of moth

Denisia obscurella is a moth of the family Oecophoridae. It was described by Wilhelm Brandt in 1937. It is found in Scandinavia and northern Russia.

Its wingspan is 12–18 millimetres (0.47–0.71 in). Adults are on wing from May to July.
