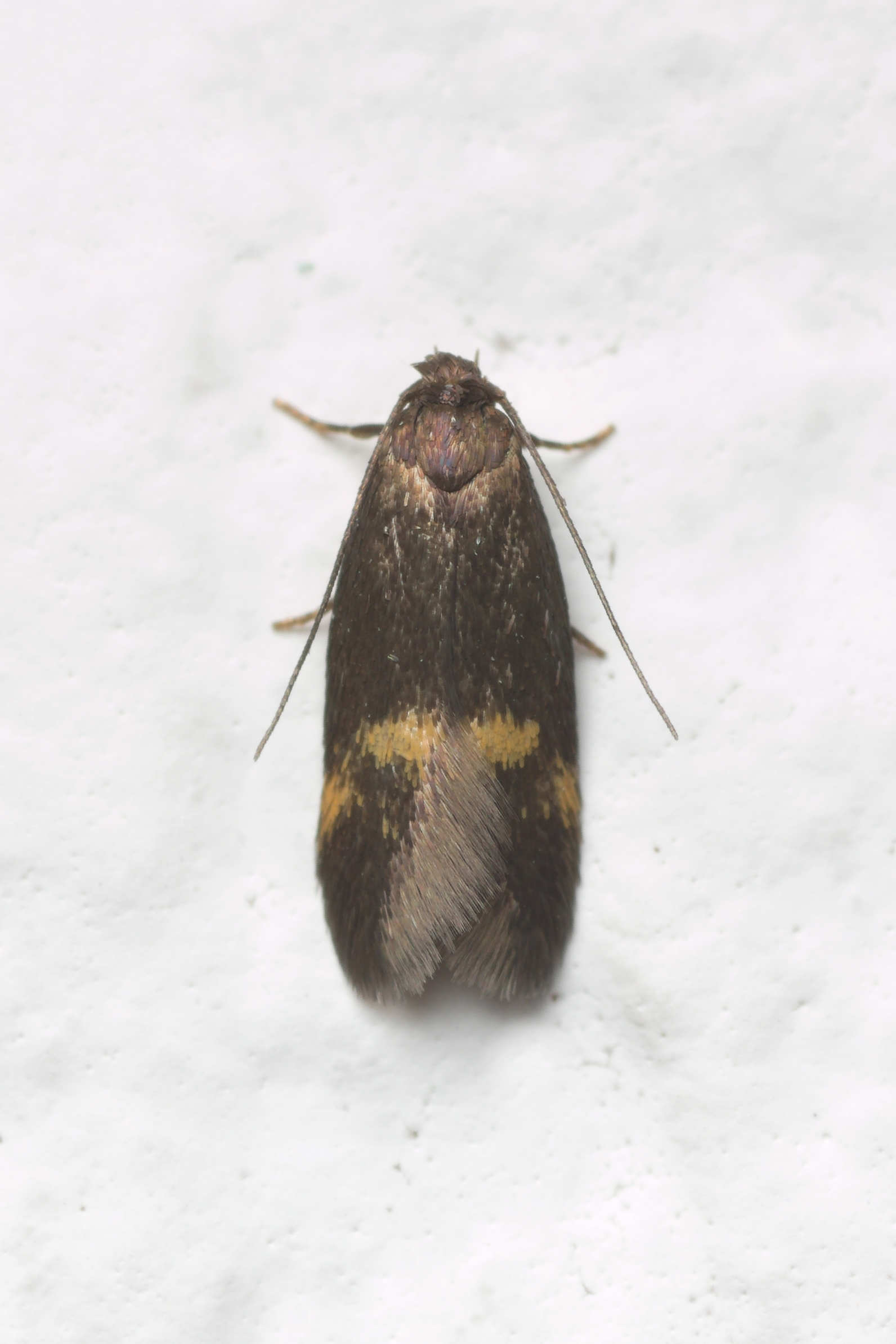
- Adult B. minutella (Poland)
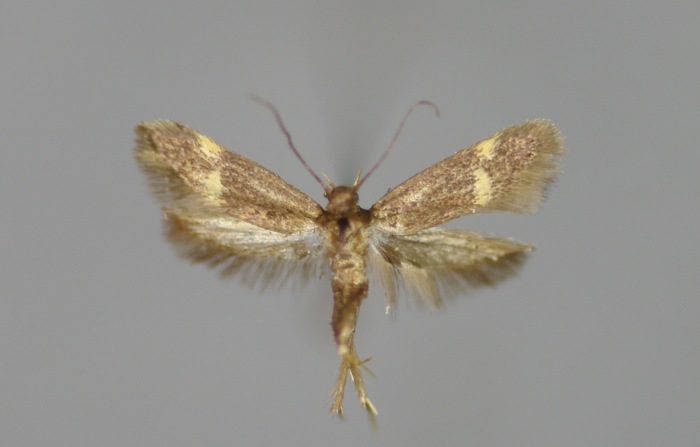

Scientific classification
- Kingdom: Animalia
- Phylum: Arthropoda
- Clade: Pancrustacea
- Class: Insecta
- Order: Lepidoptera
- Family: Oecophoridae
- Genus: Borkhausenia
- Species: B. minutella

Binomial name
- Borkhausenia minutella (Linnaeus, 1758)

Synonyms
- Phalaena minutella Linnaeus, 1758

= Borkhausenia minutella =

Species of moth

Borkhausenia minutella is a species of moth. Within its superfamily, it is placed within the subfamily Oecophorinae of the "concealer moth" family, Oecophoridae.

It is found in Europe, where it is most commonly found in rural landscapes. It is to some extent synanthropic, being regularly found around traditional farms. But apparently, this species is not able to tolerate industrial agriculture well: it has been declining across its range during the 20th century, and it is nowadays rare in the United Kingdom, where it used to be common in past times, having not been seen from about 1966 until found again in Kent in 2017.

This is a small moth, with a wingspan of 10–14 millimetres (0.39–0.55 in). Its overall coloration is a dark and somewhat metallic slate grey, with two large pale yellow markings on each forewing.Meyrick describes it - Forewings dark fuscous; a transverse ochreous-yellow tornal spot, and a smaller one on costa beyond it. Hindwings grey. Larva whitish; head pale brown; plate of 2 pale 3 yellow- brown.

The adults fly from May to June depending on the location. The caterpillars feed on seeds and other dry plantstuffs such as dried fruit; they have also been recorded in chicken (Gallus gallus) nests.

== See also ==
- List of extinct animals of Britain
