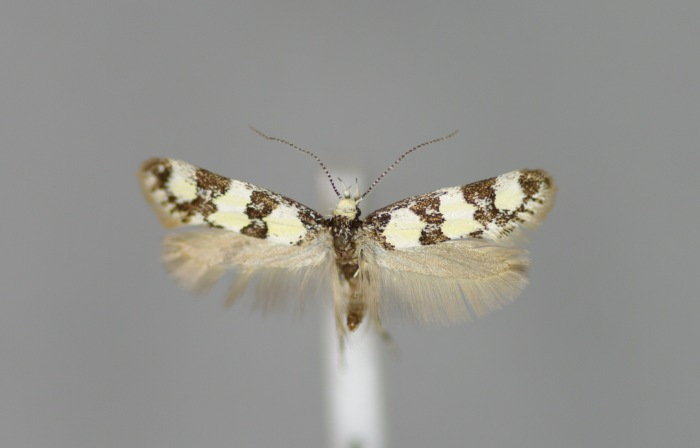
- Male
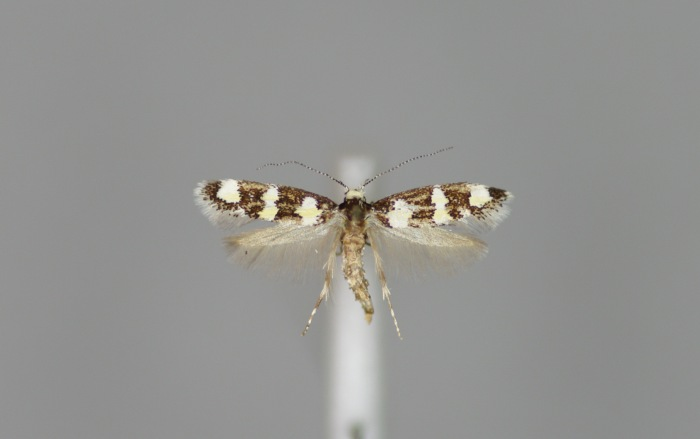
- Female

Scientific classification
- Domain: Eukaryota
- Kingdom: Animalia
- Phylum: Arthropoda
- Class: Insecta
- Order: Lepidoptera
- Family: Oecophoridae
- Genus: Denisia
- Species: D. muellerrutzi

Binomial name
- Denisia muellerrutzi (Amsel, 1939)

Synonyms
- Borkhausenia muellerrutzi Amsel, 1939

= Denisia muellerrutzi =

Species of moth

Denisia muellerrutzi is a moth of the family Oecophoridae. It is found on Corsica and Sardinia.
