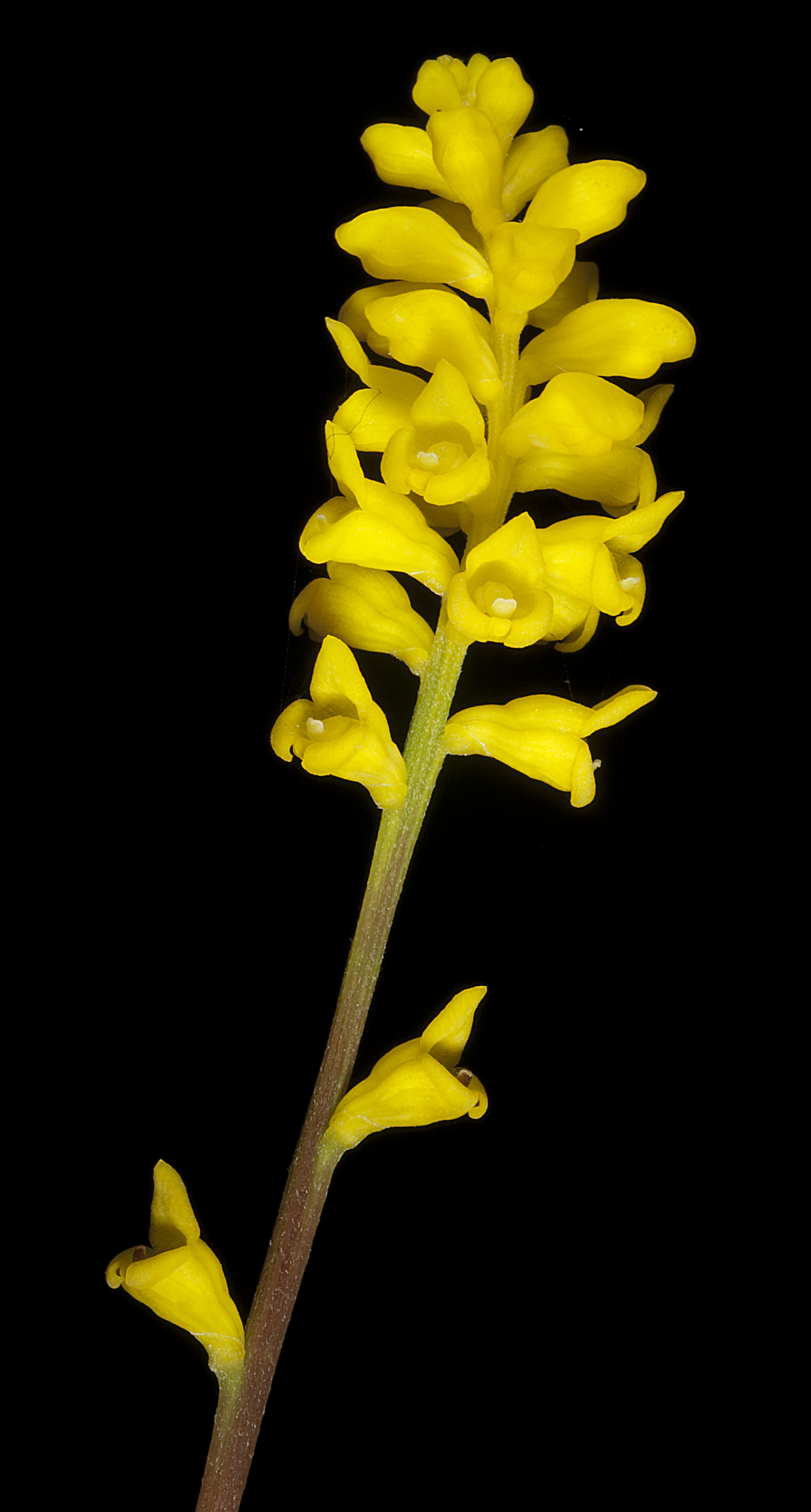

Conservation status
- Priority Four — Rare Taxa (DEC)

Scientific classification
- Kingdom: Plantae
- Clade: Tracheophytes
- Clade: Angiosperms
- Clade: Eudicots
- Order: Proteales
- Family: Proteaceae
- Genus: Synaphea
- Species: S. grandis

Binomial name
- Synaphea grandis A.S.George

= Synaphea grandis =

Species of Australian shrub in the family Proteaceae

Synaphea grandis is a species of flowering plant in the family Proteaceae and is endemic to the south-west of Western Australia. It is a tufted shrub with stems covered with soft hairs, pinnatipartite leaves with one or two pinnatipartite lobes, spikes of more or less crowded yellow flowers and oval fruit.

== Description ==
Synaphea grandis is a tufted shrub that typically grows up to 30 cm (12 in) high and has stems that are covered with soft hairs at first. The leaves are pinnatipartite, 70–130 mm (2.8–5.1 in) long and 80–200 mm (3.1–7.9 in) wide, on a mostly glabrous petiole 50–250 mm (2.0–9.8 in) long. The lowest one or two lobes of the leaves are also pinnatipartite, the end lobes lance-shaped to triangular 3–8 mm (0.12–0.31 in) wide. The flowers are yellow and borne in more or less crowded spikes up to 90 mm (3.5 in) long on a peduncle up to 1 m (3 ft 3 in) long. There are spreading, egg-shaped bracts 1.5 mm (0.059 in) long at the base of the peduncles. The perianth is curved, opens widely, the upper tepal 5.5–7 mm (0.22–0.28 in) long and 2.5 mm (0.098 in) wide, the lower tepal 5 mm (0.20 in) long. The stigma is more or less oblong, curved at the tip, 1.5–2.0 mm (0.059–0.079 in) long and 1.1–1.2 mm (0.043–0.047 in) wide. Flowering occurs in October and November and the fruit is oval and covered with soft hairs.

== Taxonomy ==
Synaphea grandis was first formally described in 1995 by Alex George in the Flora of Australia from specimens he collected 1 mi (1.6 km) east of the Muchea turnoff from the Great Northern Highway on the Chittering road in 1971. The specific epithet (grandis) means 'great', 'large' or 'tall'.

== Distribution and habitat ==
This species of Synaphea grows on hills in Eucalyptus wandoo woodland in the Muchea-Bindoon area north of Perth in the Avon Wheatbelt, Jarrah Forest and Swan Coastal Plain bioregions of south-western Western Australia.

== Conservation status ==
Synaphea grandis is listed as "Priority Four" by the Government of Western Australia Department of Biodiversity, Conservation and Attractions, meaning that is rare or near threatened.
