= Schiffermuelleria grandis =

Scientific classification
- Kingdom: Animalia
- Phylum: Arthropoda
- Class: Insecta
- Order: Lepidoptera
- Family: Oecophoridae
- Genus: Schiffermuelleria
- Species: S. grandis

Binomial name
- Schiffermuelleria grandis Desvignes, 1842

Synonyms
- Pancalia grandis Desvignes, 1842; Schiffermuellerina grandis (Desvignes, 1842)

Species of moth

Schiffermuelleria grandis is a species of moth belonging to the family Oecophoridae.

It is native to Central and Western Europe.

The wingspan is about 15 mm. The moth flies from May to June depending on the location.

The larvae feed on bark and decayed wood.
