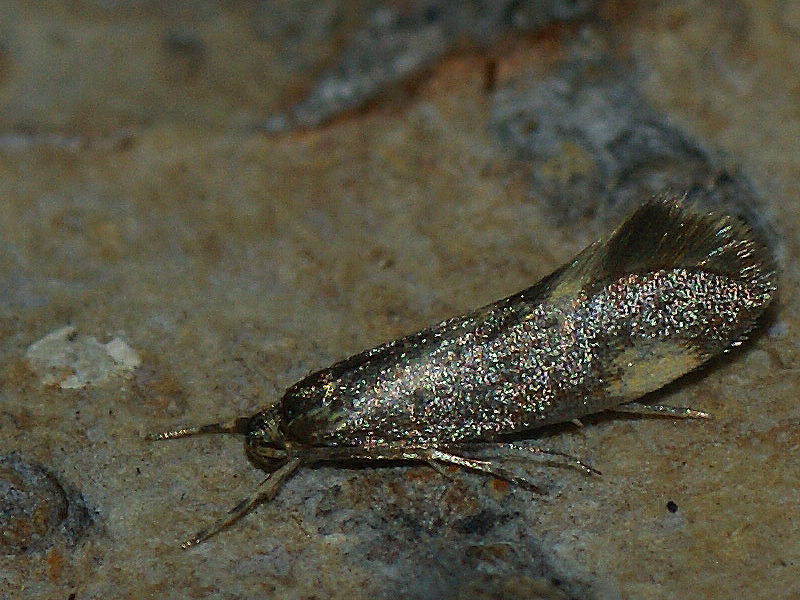

Scientific classification
- Kingdom: Animalia
- Phylum: Arthropoda
- Clade: Pancrustacea
- Class: Insecta
- Order: Lepidoptera
- Family: Oecophoridae
- Genus: Metalampra
- Species: M. cinnamomea

Binomial name
- Metalampra cinnamomea (Zeller, 1839)

Synonyms
- Oecophora cinnamomea Zeller, 1839

= Metalampra cinnamomea =

Species of moth

Metalampra cinnamomea is a moth of the family Oecophoridae. It was described by Philipp Christoph Zeller in 1839. It is found in most of Europe, except the Iberian Peninsula, most of the Balkan Peninsula, Ireland and Great Britain.

The wingspan is 10–14 mm. Adults have been recorded on wing from May to October in one generation per year.

The larvae feed on Abies alba, Alnus, Betula, Pinus, Quercus species. They live in decayed wood, under dead bark and in rotten plant material from their host conifers and deciduous trees.
