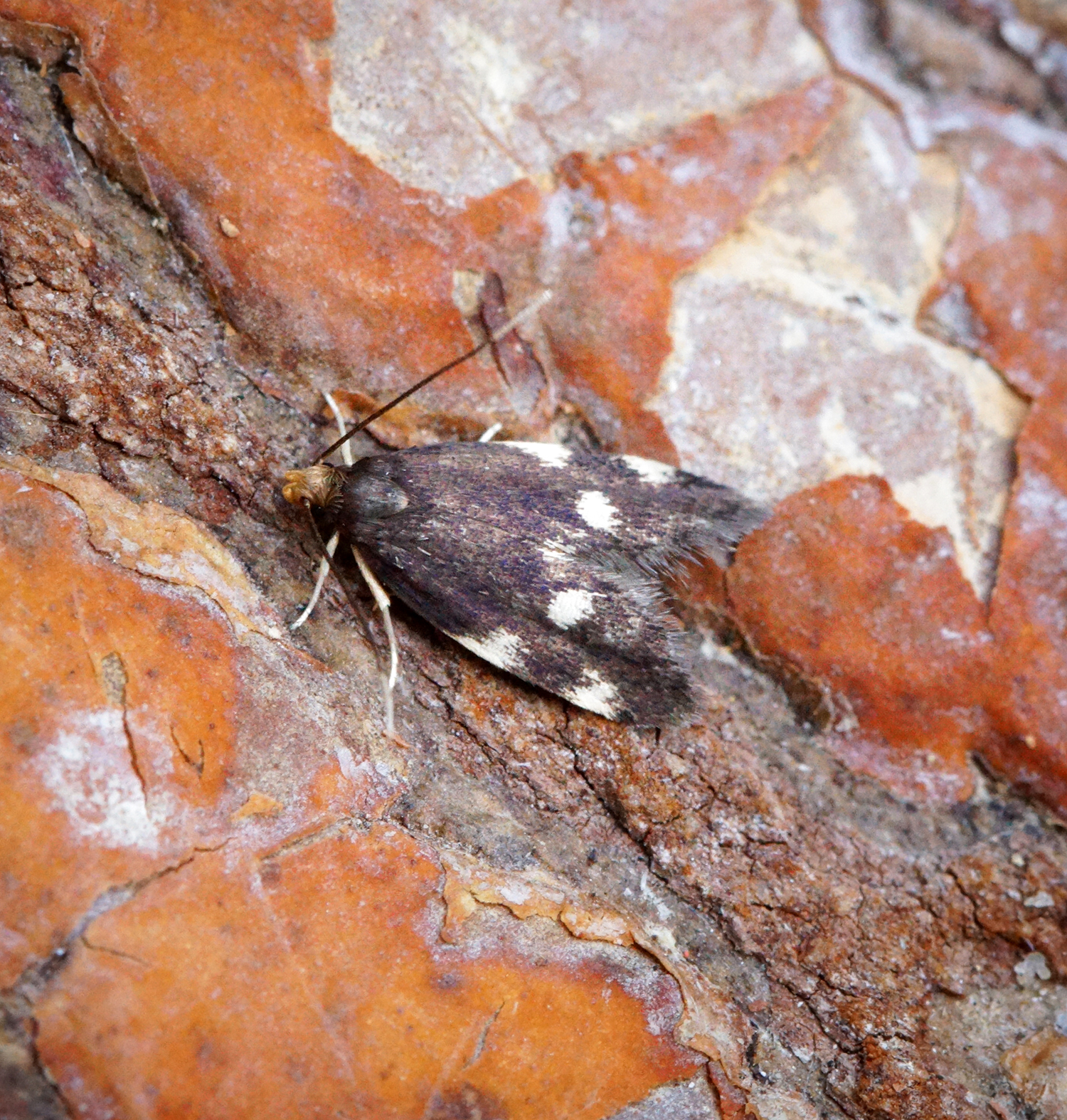
- Schiffermuelleria tripuncta

Scientific classification
- Kingdom: Animalia
- Phylum: Arthropoda
- Class: Insecta
- Order: Lepidoptera
- Family: Oecophoridae
- Genus: Schiffermuelleria
- Species: S. tripuncta

Binomial name
- Schiffermuelleria tripuncta (Haworth, 1829)

Synonyms
- Telechrysis tripuncta (Haworth, 1829); Recurvaria tripuncta Haworth, 1829

= Schiffermuelleria tripuncta =

Genus of moths

Schiffermuelleria tripuncta is a species of concealer moth in the family Oecophoridae. It is found in much of Europe. The species was formerly a member of the genus Telechrysis and is sometimes called Telechrysis tripuncta.

The wingspan of this moth is 10–14 mm. Adults have three pale, evenly spaced spots on each forewing. They are on wing in May and June.

The larvae are thought to feed in dead or rotting wood.
