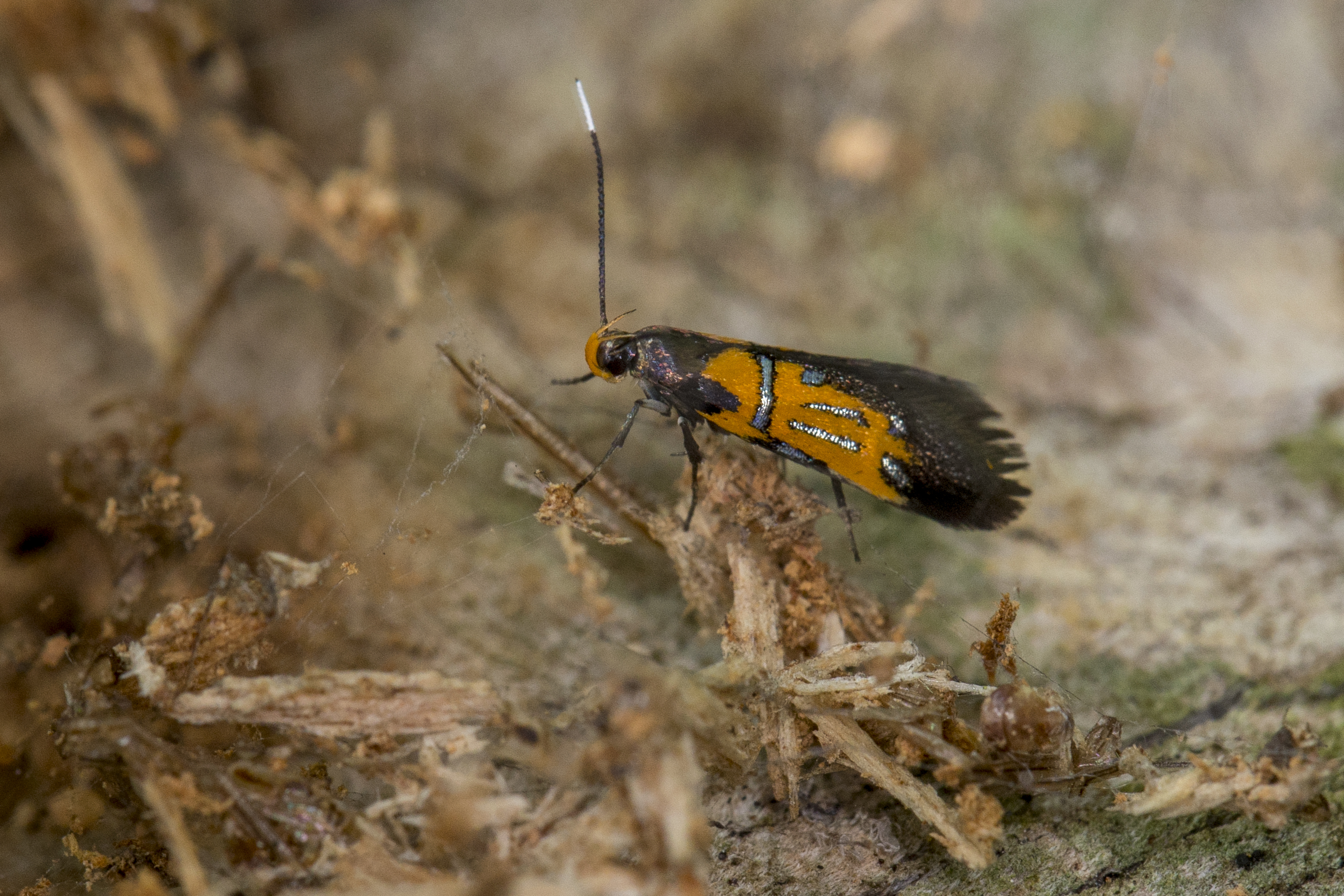
- Schiffermuelleria grandis

Scientific classification
- Kingdom: Animalia
- Phylum: Arthropoda
- Class: Insecta
- Order: Lepidoptera
- Family: Oecophoridae
- Subfamily: Oecophorinae
- Genus: Schiffermuelleria; Hübner, 1826

Synonyms
- Acompsia Meyrick, 1895; Chrysia Millière, 1854; Disqueia Spuler, 1910; Disquela Spuler, 1910; Schiffermuellerina Leraut

= Schiffermuelleria =

Genus of moths

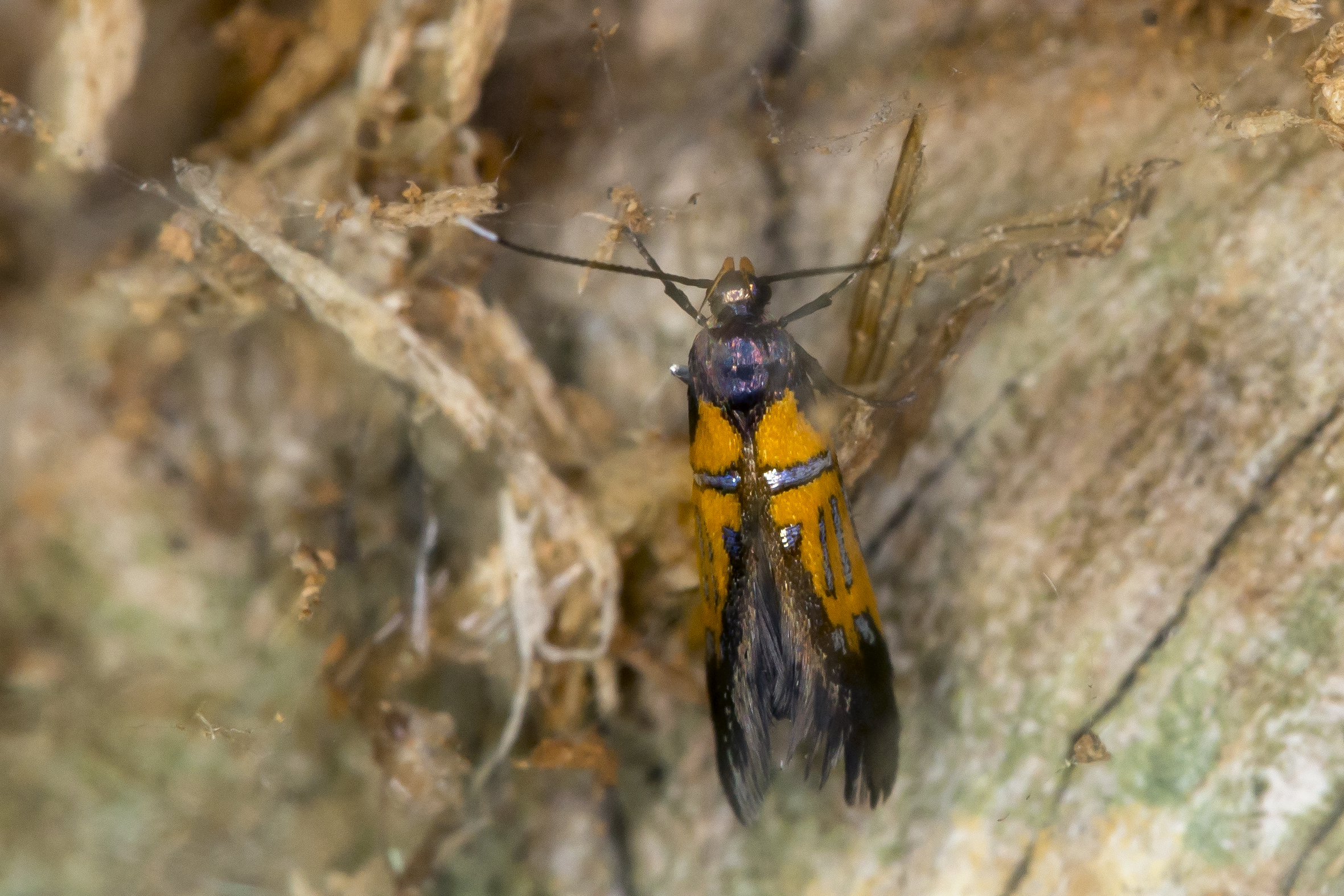
Schiffermuelleria schaefferella

Schiffermuelleria is a genus of concealer moths in the family Oecophoridae. There are about 30 described species in Schiffermuelleria, found in Europe, Africa, Asia, and New Zealand.

== Species ==
These 30 species belong to the genus Schiffermuelleria:

- Schiffermuelleria albocinctella (Chrétien, 1915)
- Schiffermuelleria albomaculella (Caradja, 1920)
- Schiffermuelleria amasiella (Herrich-Schäffer, 1855)
- Schiffermuelleria antidectis (Meyrick, 1914)
- Schiffermuelleria argentidisca (Dognin, 1905)
- Schiffermuelleria bisinuella (Erschoff, 1874)
- Schiffermuelleria bruandella (Ragonot, 1889)
- Schiffermuelleria conchylidella (Snellen, 1884)
- Schiffermuelleria einsleri (Amsel, 1933)
- Schiffermuelleria grandis Desvignes, 1842
- Schiffermuelleria haasi (Rebel, 1902)
- Schiffermuelleria heptalitha Meyrick, 1931
- Schiffermuelleria jantharica Skalski, 1977
- Schiffermuelleria leucochrysella (Millière, 1854)
- Schiffermuelleria obolaea Meyrick, 1910
- Schiffermuelleria orthophanes Meyrick, 1905
- Schiffermuelleria osthelderi (Rebel, 1935)
- Schiffermuelleria pictipennis (Wollaston, 1879)
- Schiffermuelleria quadrimaculella (Chambers, 1875)
- Schiffermuelleria reducta (Walsingham, 1901)
- Schiffermuelleria rostrigera Meyrick, 1919
- Schiffermuelleria sardiophanes Meyrick, 1937
- Schiffermuelleria schaefferella (Linnaeus, 1758)
- Schiffermuelleria splendidella Amsel, 1935
- Schiffermuelleria splendidula (Wollaston, 1879)
- Schiffermuelleria taboga (Busck, 1914)
- Schiffermuelleria tetractis Meyrick, 1936
- Schiffermuelleria tripuncta (Haworth, 1829)
- Schiffermuelleria venturellii (Costantini, 1923)
- Schiffermuelleria zelleri (Christoph, 1882)

Some sources recognize two subgenera, Schiffermuelleria (Schiffermuelleria) Hübner, 1825 and Schiffermuelleria (Schiffermuellerina) Leraut, 1989.
