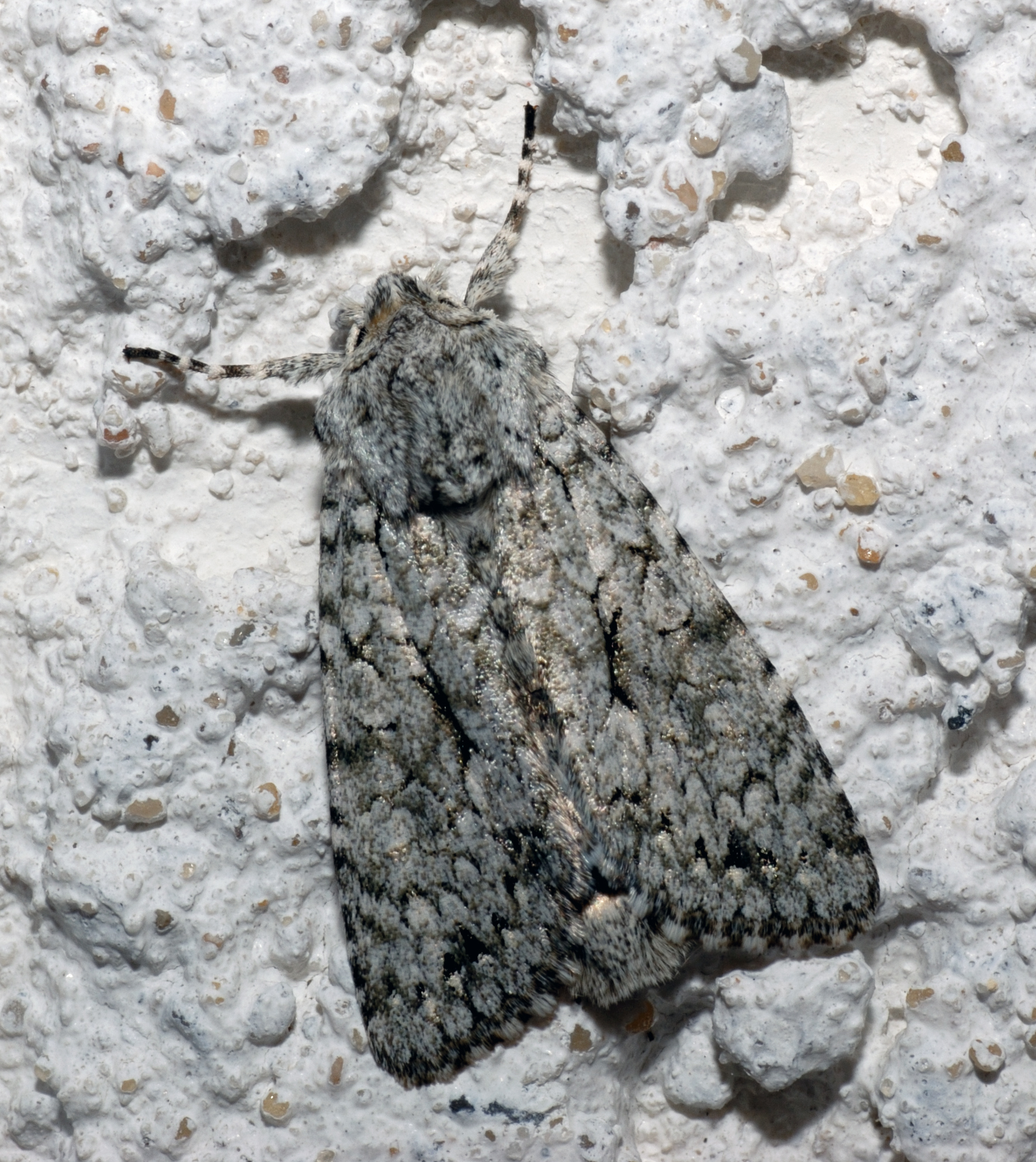
- Antitype chi

Scientific classification
- Kingdom: Animalia
- Phylum: Arthropoda
- Clade: Pancrustacea
- Class: Insecta
- Order: Lepidoptera
- Superfamily: Noctuoidea
- Family: Noctuidae
- Subfamily: Cuculliinae
- Genus: Antitype; Hübner, [1821]

= Antitype (moth) =

Genus of moths

Antitype is a genus of moths of the family Noctuidae. The genus was erected by Jacob Hübner in 1821.

The scientific name is derived from the Greek antitupos (something that returns). Hübner probably referred to similarities with a genus which was described earlier, probably Polymixis.

== Species ==
- Antitype africana Berio, 1939
- Antitype armena (Eversmann, 1856)
- Antitype chi (Linnaeus, 1758) – grey chi
- Antitype chionodes Boursin, 1968
- Antitype jonis (Lederer, 1865)
- Antitype suda (Geyer, [1832])

Antitype kalchbergi is now known as Brachygalea kalchbergi (Staudinger, 1897).
