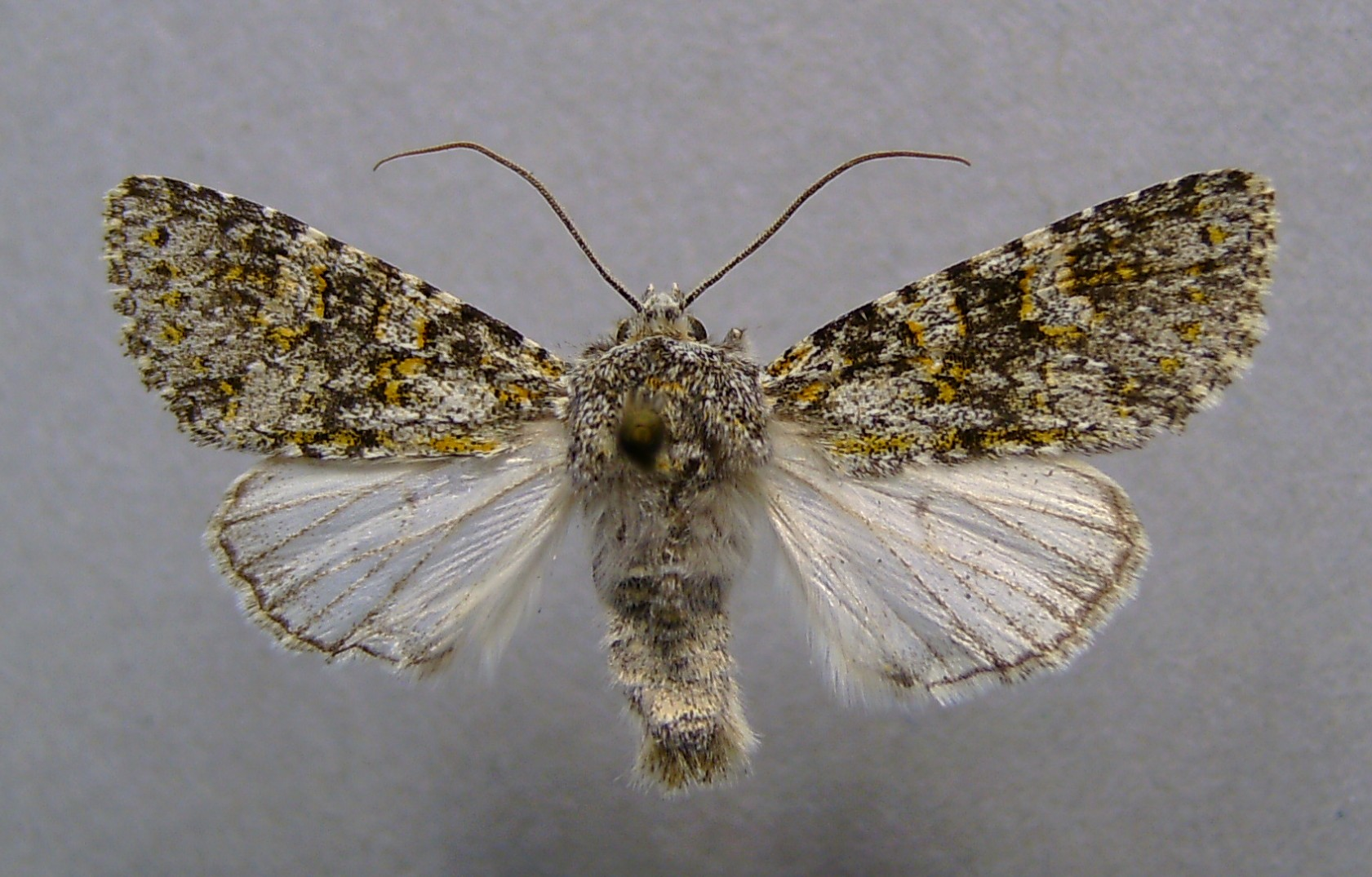

Scientific classification
- Kingdom: Animalia
- Phylum: Arthropoda
- Clade: Pancrustacea
- Class: Insecta
- Order: Lepidoptera
- Superfamily: Noctuoidea
- Family: Noctuidae
- Genus: Polymixis
- Species: P. xanthomista

Binomial name
- Polymixis xanthomista (Hübner, 1819)

Synonyms
- List: Noctua xanthomista Hübner, [1819]; Polia nigrocincta Treitschke, 1825; Polia nigrocincta var. nivescens Staudinger, 1861; Polia xanthomista r. nivea Dannehl, 1929

= Polymixis xanthomista =

Species of moth

Polymixis xanthomista, the black-banded polymixis, is a moth of the family Noctuidae. The species was first described by Jacob Hübner in 1819. It is found in western Europe, southern Europe and east to Romania, Hungary and Slovenia and also in North Africa. In the Alps it can be found at up to 2000 metres above sea level.

== Technical description and variation ==
Forewing greyish white, thickly dusted with blackish grey, the median area filled up with blackish; the edges of the lines and stigmata and the course of vein 1 picked out with yellow scales; the upper stigmata large and paler, the orbicular with a dark dot in middle; submarginal line preceded by wedge-shaped black marks; hindwing of male white, with the veins blackish and sometimes a slight grey submarginal band before the blackish marginal line; of female uniform dark grey; — nigrocincta Tr., the more common form, is blacker, with the yellow scales more or less obsolete; – nivescens Stgr. from the chalk district of the Jura, Switzerland, has the ground colour of the basal and marginal areas much whiter; — statices Gregs. is a dark smaller race from the Isle of Man; its main difference is that the inner and outer lines edging the blackish median area are more distinctly and broadly white, especially below the middle; the amount of yellow scaling is variable.

== Biology ==
Adults are on wing from the end of August to mid-October. In Europe the moth is largely restricted to mountainous regions while, typically for a species on the edge of their distribution, such as in the UK, it has different habitat requirements; which is usually within the splash zone on the coast, with thrift (Armeria maritima) the main food for the larvae.

Ovum

Eggs are laid singly on the food plant.

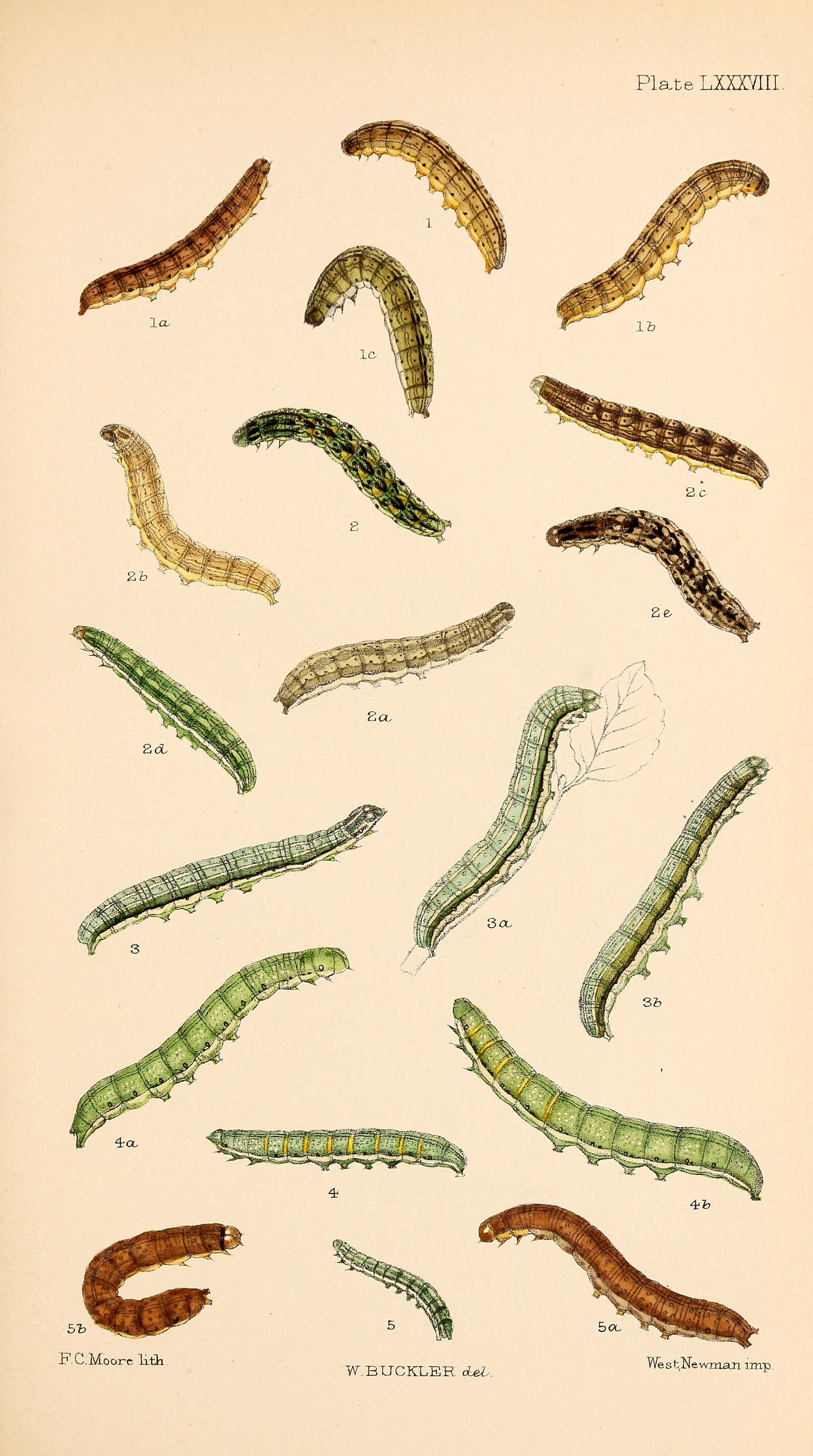
Figs.5, 5a, 5b larvae in various stages of growth

Larvae

Larvae are reddish brown, thickly speckled with tiny dark dots, which form a dorsal and two broader subdorsal. They feed on various plants, including Plantago, Taraxacum, Verbascum, Rumex, Lonicera and Prunus padus.

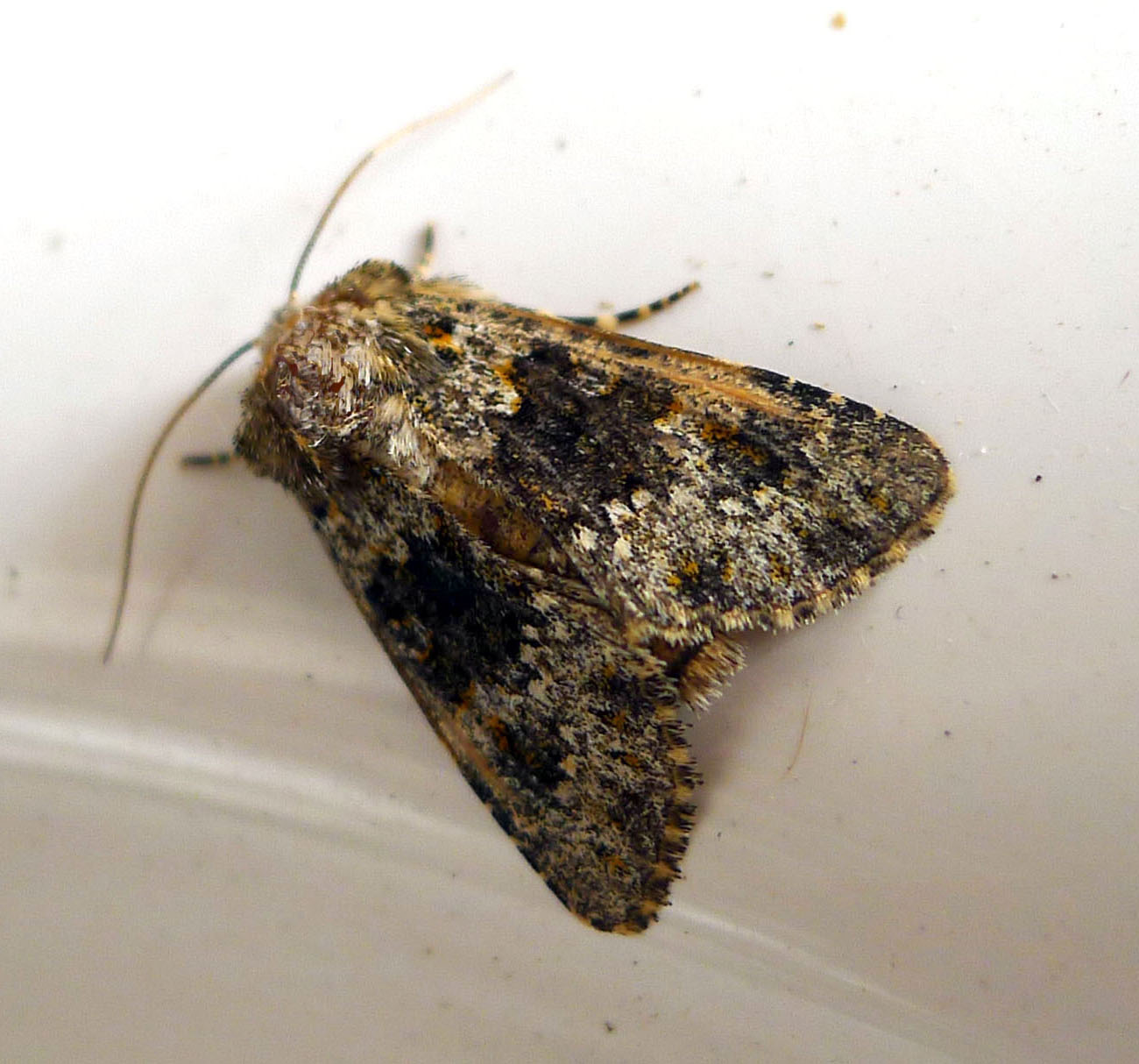
Polymixis xanthomista subsp. statices

Pupa

The glossy red-brown pupa is found in a large, subterranean cocoon.

== Subspecies ==
- Polymixis xanthomista xanthomista (North Africa through western southern Europe, east to Romania, Hungary and Slovenia)
- Polymixis xanthomista statices Gregson, 1869 (UK and Ireland)
- Polymixis xanthomista lutea Schwingenschuss, 1963 (Morocco)
- Polymixis xanthomista hadenina Rungs, 1972 (Morocco)
- Polymixis xanthomista rmadia Rungs, 1967 (Morocco)
- Polymixis xanthomista meftouha Rungs, 1967 (Morocco)
- Polymixis xanthomista chehebia Rungs, 1972 (Morocco)

=== Subspecies statices ===
Subspecies statices (restricted to Ireland and the UK) has been recorded on various low growing plants and seems to prefer the flowers. Food plants include kidney vetch (Anthyllis vulneraria), thrift Armeria maritima, harebell (Campanula rotundifolia) sea plaintain (Plantago maritima), white campion (Silene latifolia), sea campion (Silene uniflora), dandelion (Taraxacum officinale) and sweet violet (Viola odorata). Thrift is the preferred plant. In the UK, it has been found from the Isles of Scilly, north and south coasts of Cornwall and Devon, Pembrokeshire, Cardiganshire and Ynys Mon. In Ireland it has been found in County Cork.
