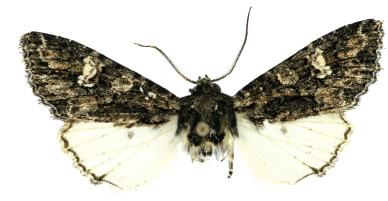
- Male
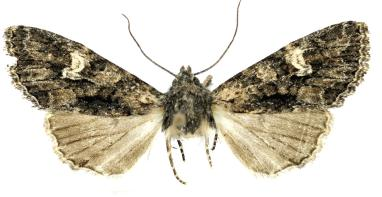
- Female

Scientific classification
- Domain: Eukaryota
- Kingdom: Animalia
- Phylum: Arthropoda
- Class: Insecta
- Order: Lepidoptera
- Superfamily: Noctuoidea
- Family: Noctuidae
- Genus: Polymixis
- Species: P. iatnana

Binomial name
- Polymixis iatnana Hacker, 1996

= Polymixis iatnana =

Species of moth

Polymixis iatnana is a moth of the family Noctuidae. It is found on Cyprus.

== Taxonomy ==
Polymixis iatnana was formerly treated as a subspecies Polymixis serpentina.
