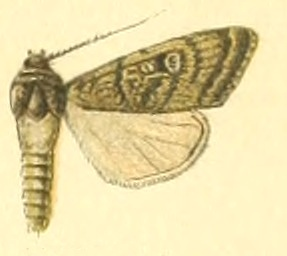

Scientific classification
- Domain: Eukaryota
- Kingdom: Animalia
- Phylum: Arthropoda
- Class: Insecta
- Order: Lepidoptera
- Superfamily: Noctuoidea
- Family: Noctuidae
- Genus: Antitype
- Species: A. armena

Binomial name
- Antitype armena (Eversmann, 1856)

Synonyms
- Agrotis armena Eversmann, 1856; Euxoa armena (Eversmann, 1856)

= Antitype armena =

Species of moth

Antitype armena is a moth of the family Noctuidae. It is found in Armenia.
