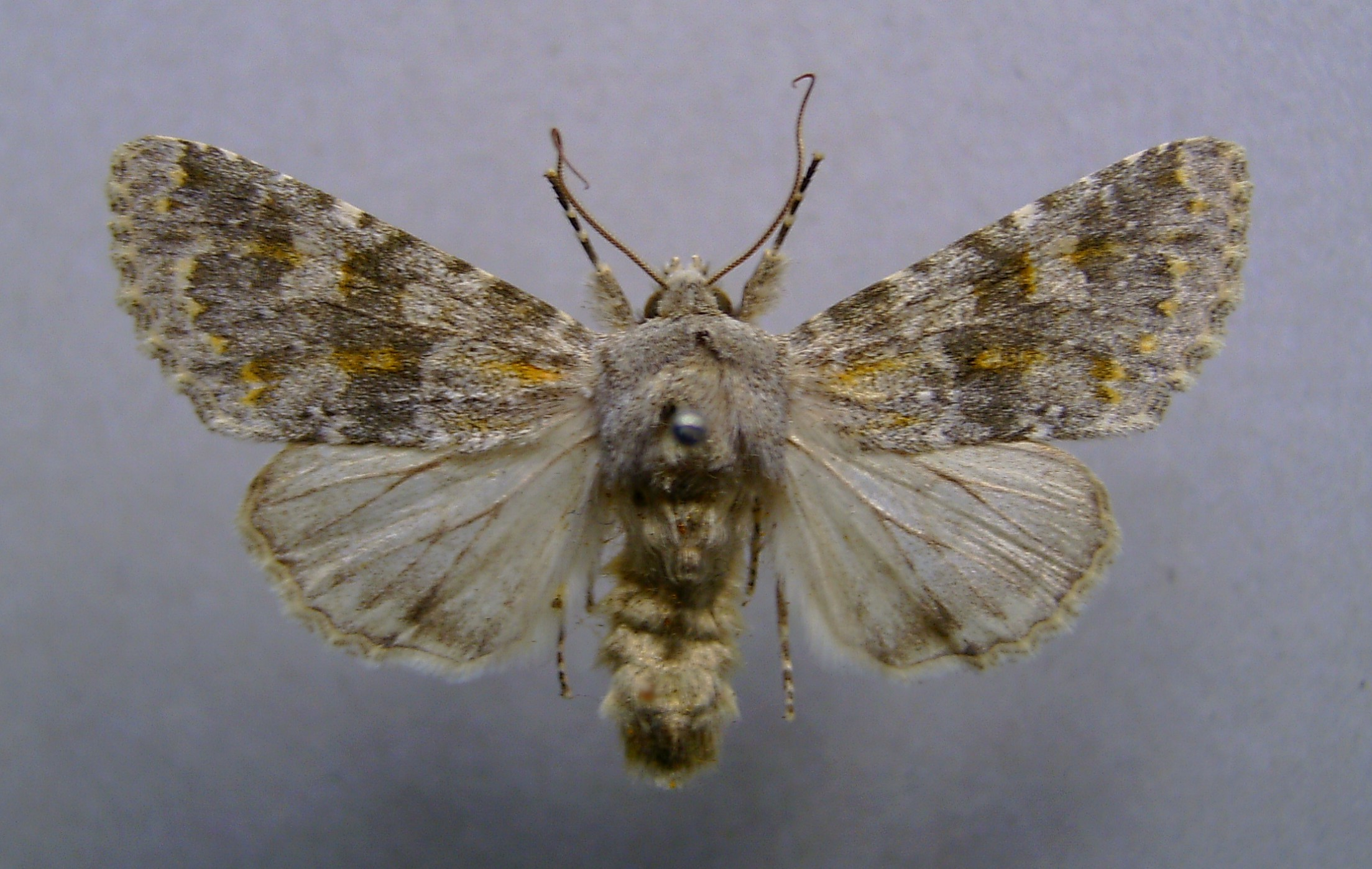

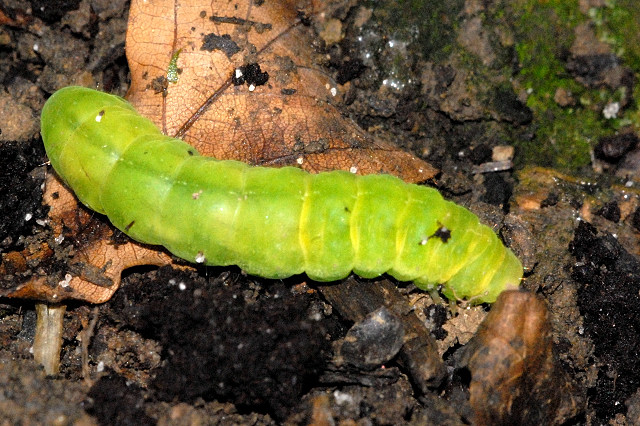

Scientific classification
- Kingdom: Animalia
- Phylum: Arthropoda
- Clade: Pancrustacea
- Class: Insecta
- Order: Lepidoptera
- Superfamily: Noctuoidea
- Family: Noctuidae
- Genus: Polymixis
- Species: P. flavicincta

Binomial name
- Polymixis flavicincta (Denis & Schiffermüller, 1775)

Synonyms
- Noctua flavicincta Denis & Schiffermüller, 1775; Noctua dysodea Esper, 1790; Polymixis major (Esper, 1790); Polia ochracea Smith, 1900; Andropolia ochracea; Polymixis lajonquierei

= Polymixis flavicincta =

Species of moth

The large ranunculus (Polymixis flavicincta) is a moth of the family Noctuidae. It is found in Europe and North Africa.

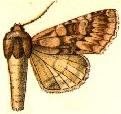
Illustration

== Technical description and variation ==
A. flavicincta F. (= flavicincta-major Esp., dysodea Esp. nec Hbn.) (33 c, d). Forewing pale grey speckled with darker olive grey, especially in median area; the edges of the stigmata, the course of the basal and submarginal lines, and vein 1 marked by orange scales; lines dark olive; upper stigmata paler; the claviform darker; median shade distinct; hindwing grey, darker in female, with veins, cell spot, outer line, and submarginal shade darker; the species varies in depth of colour; the darker forms are known as ab. meridionalis Bsd. (33 d) from Spain and Corsica; — calvescens Bsd. (33 d) [ Polymixis rufocincta calvescens (Boisduval, 1840) ] on the other hand is a pale grey form with the yellow scaling, all but obsolete, occurring in S. France, Italy, and Sicily; ab. albescens ab. nov. (33 d) is dull white, without grey dusting except in median area, the upper stigmata also whitish; hindwing paler. Larva pale bluish green, with a darker dorsal vessel and broad pale spiracular stripe; head green. The wingspan is 40–50 mm. The length of the forewings is 17–22 mm.

== Biology ==
The moth flies in one generation from the end of August to November and are attracted to light.

The larvae feed on various grasses, such as mint, Taraxacum officinale, Senecio, Fireweed and at times even fruit bearing trees.

== Subspecies ==
- Polymixis flavicincta flavicincta
- Polymixis flavicincta meridionalis (Boisduval, 1840) (Corsica,...)
- Polymixis flavicincta lajonquierei Boursin, 1963 (Spain,...)
- Polymixis flavicincta caroli Plante, 1975 (Algeria,...)
- Polymixis flavicincta laportei Plante, 1975 (Morocco,...)

== Notes ==
1. The flight season refers to Belgium and the Netherlands. This may vary in other parts of the range.
