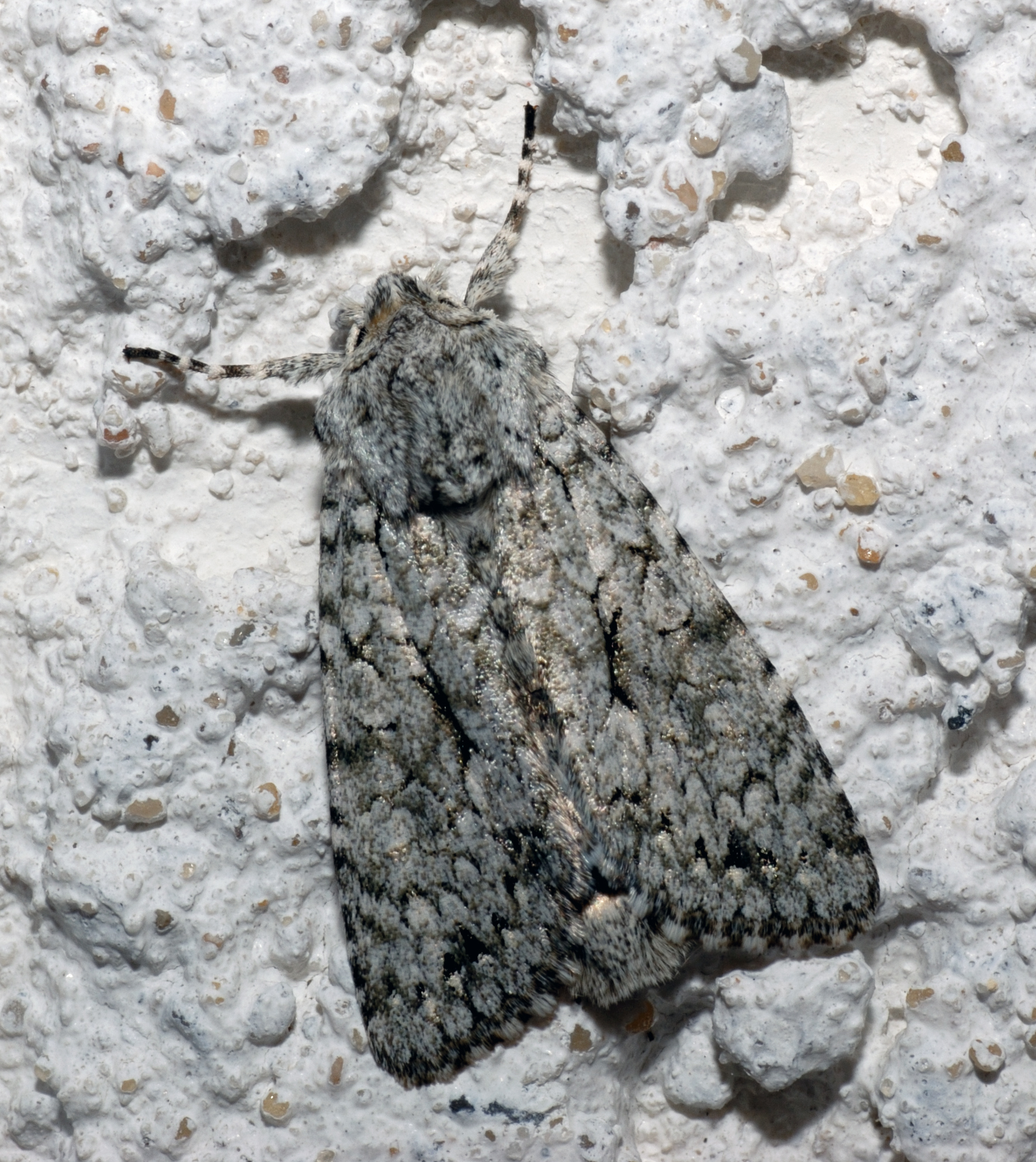

Scientific classification
- Kingdom: Animalia
- Phylum: Arthropoda
- Class: Insecta
- Order: Lepidoptera
- Superfamily: Noctuoidea
- Family: Noctuidae
- Genus: Antitype
- Species: A. chi

Binomial name
- Antitype chi (Linnaeus, 1758)

Synonyms
- Phalaena chi Linnaeus, 1758; Phalaena Noctua chi Linnaeus, 1758; Polia olivacea Stephens, 1829; Polia chi f. caerulescens Hartig, 1924; Polia chi r. marsicana Dannehl, 1929

= Grey chi =

Antitype chi

Species of moth

The grey chi (/kaɪ/; Antitype chi) is a moth of the family Noctuidae. The species was first described by Carl Linnaeus in his 1758 10th edition of Systema Naturae. It is distributed throughout Europe, although it is not present in southern Spain and Greece, as well as northern Fennoscandia. It is also found across the Palearctic including Central Asia, to the Russian Far East but not in Japan.

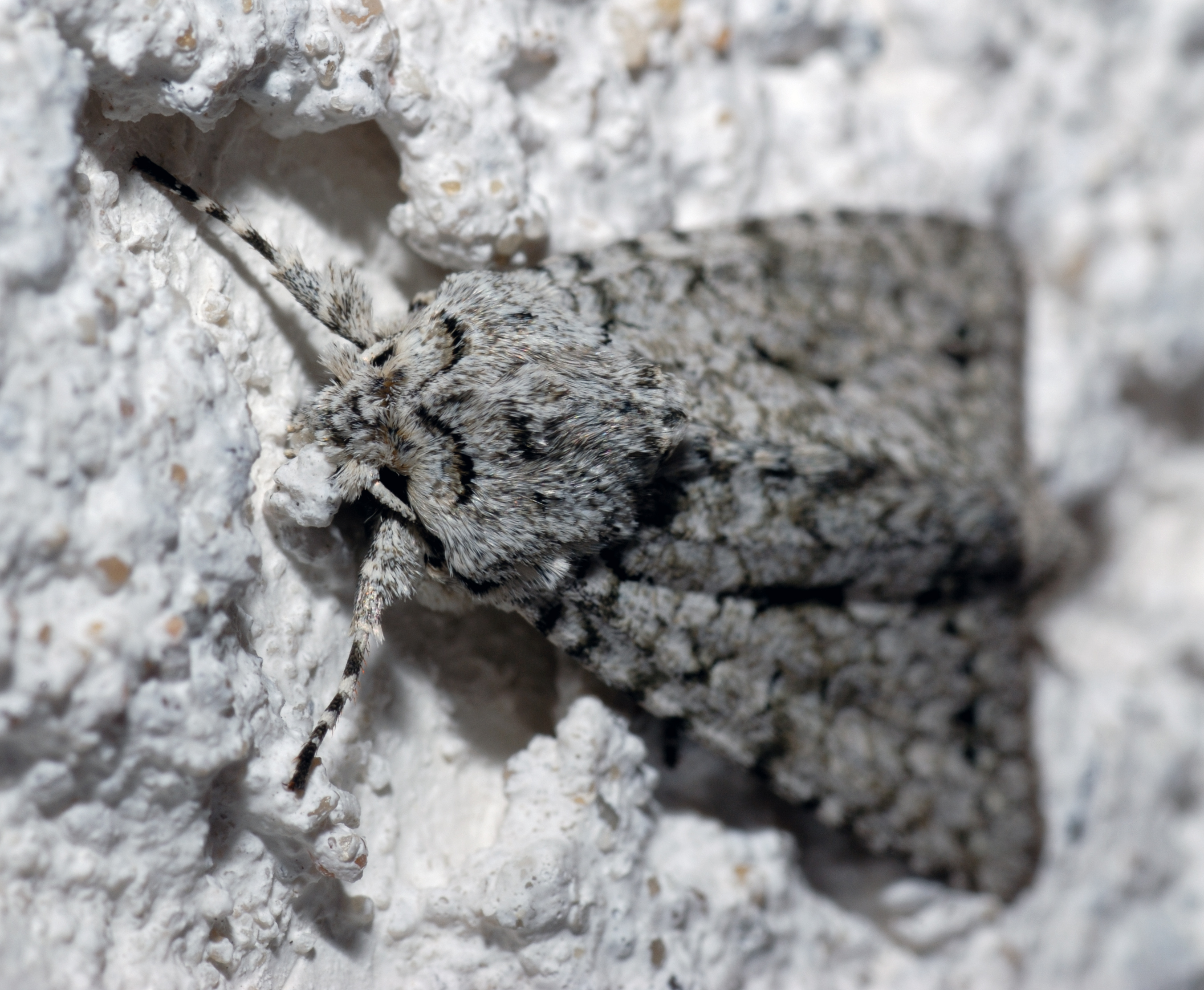
Front view

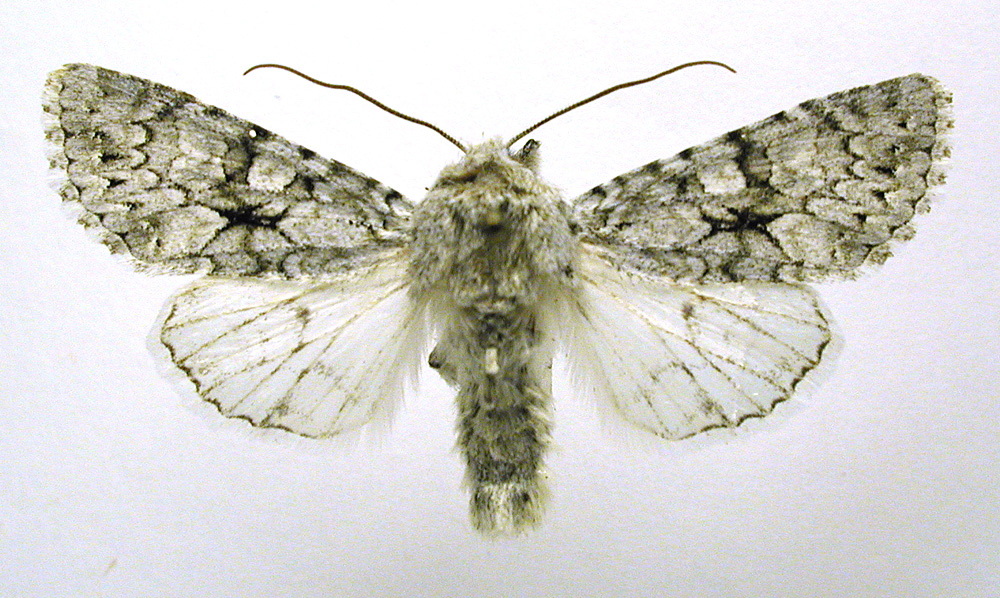
Mounted

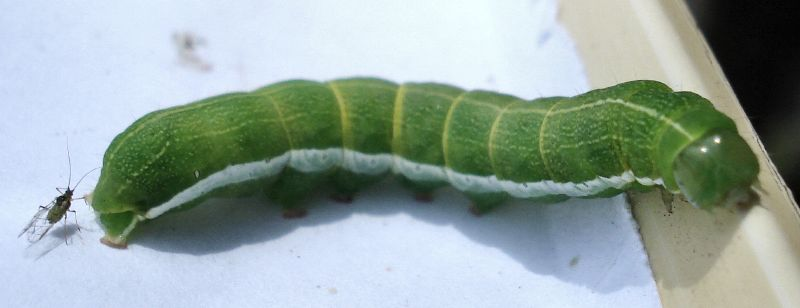
Caterpillar

This species has grey forewings speckled with black markings which vary in intensity (with the female generally more heavily marked than the male). There is usually a bold cross-shaped black mark in the centre of the wing which has been likened to the Greek letter chi (Χ) and gives the species its common name. The hindwings are white in the male, dirty grey in the female.

== Technical description and variation ==
A. chi L. (33 i, 34 a). Forewing chalk white, grey-speckled; the lines double, grey; median area darker, the stigmata pale grey and conspicuous; the claviform at extremity edged with black and joined by a black dash to the inner blacker arm of outer line; submarginal line formed of whitish spots preceded by black wedge shaped marks; hindwing of male white with interrupted grey submarginal band; of female blackish grey, with darker cellspot, veins, and outer line; the females are always darker grey than the males; — olivacea Stph. (34 a) from Scotland is suffused throughout with olive grey; — subcaerulea Graes., from N. E. Amurland, is dark bluish grey in the forewing;- suitusa Robson is a dark grey form from the North of England, of which the males are equally dark with the females an extreme local development of this form from the neighbourhood of Huddersfield, Yorkshire, ab. nigrescens Tutt is nearly black; ab. langei Harrison (34 a) is like olivacea but the submarginal line is absent, and the black marks preceding it wholly or nearly obsolete. Larva green, finely dotted with yellow; dorsal and subdorsal lines whitish; spiracular line yellowish white, diffusely dark green above .

== Biology ==
This moth flies at night in August and September and is attracted to light and sugar.

The larva feeds on the leaves and flowers of a variety of plants (see list below). The species overwinters as an egg.

1. The flight season refers to the British Isles. This may vary in other parts of the range.

== Subspecies ==
- Antitype chi chi
- Antitype chi subcaerulea (Graeser, 1889) (Russian Far East)

== Recorded food plants ==
- Artemisia - mugwort
- Convallaria - lily-of-the-valley
- Helianthus - Jerusalem artichoke
- Lactuca - lettuce
- Lathyrus - meadow vetchling
- Lychnis - campion
- Ribes - blackcurrant
- Rumex
- Salix - willow
- Saxifraga - saxifrage
- Sedum - stonecrop
- Silene - campion
- Sonchus - sow thistle
- Taraxacum - dandelion
- Triglochin
- Urtica - stinging nettle
- Viburnum - guelder rose

See.
