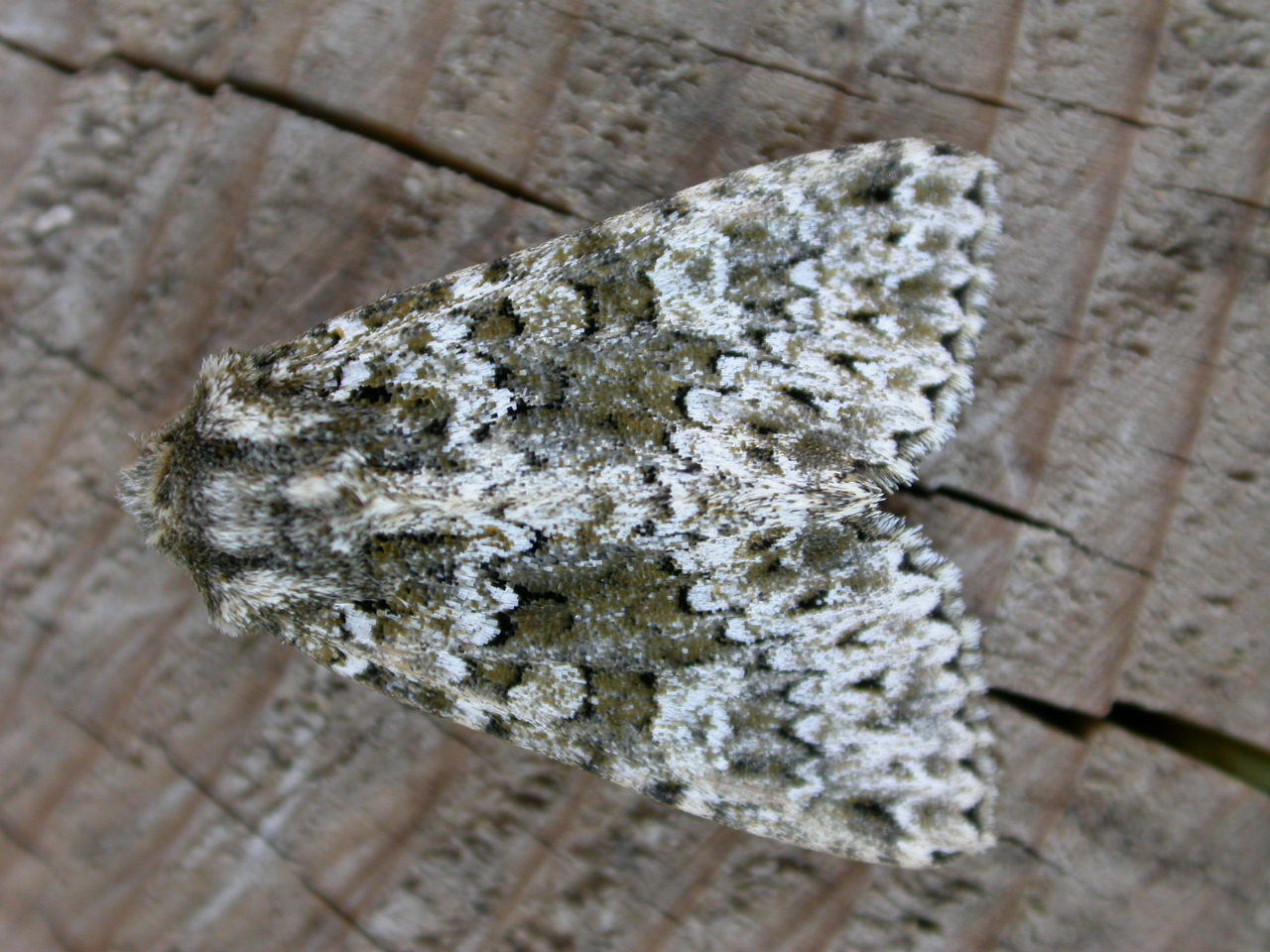

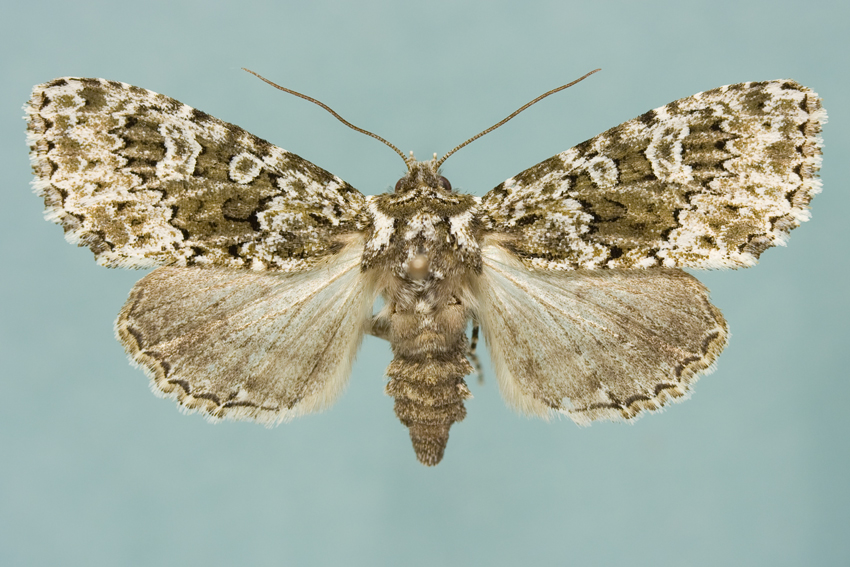

Scientific classification
- Kingdom: Animalia
- Phylum: Arthropoda
- Class: Insecta
- Order: Lepidoptera
- Superfamily: Noctuoidea
- Family: Noctuidae
- Genus: Polymixis
- Species: P. polymita

Binomial name
- Polymixis polymita (Linnaeus, 1761)

= Polymixis polymita =

Species of moth

Polymixis polymita is a moth of the family Noctuidae. It is found in most of Europe, but not in the Benelux, Britain, Ireland and the Iberian Peninsula.

The wingspan is 39–46 mm. Adults are on wing from August to October. There is one generation per annum.

The larvae feed on Primula, Lamium, Chaerophyllum and other low growing plants.
