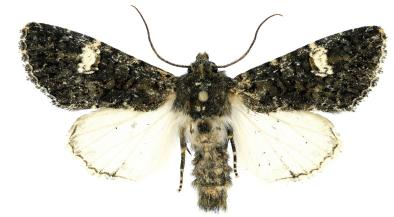
- Subspecies serpentina Male
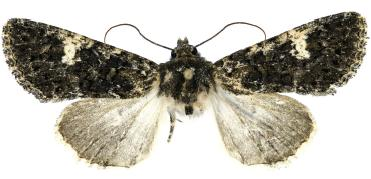
- Subspecies serpentina Female

Scientific classification
- Kingdom: Animalia
- Phylum: Arthropoda
- Clade: Pancrustacea
- Class: Insecta
- Order: Lepidoptera
- Superfamily: Noctuoidea
- Family: Noctuidae
- Genus: Polymixis
- Species: P. serpentina

Binomial name
- Polymixis serpentina (Treitschke, 1825)

Synonyms
- Miselia serpentina Treitschke, 1825

= Polymixis serpentina =

Species of moth

Polymixis serpentina is a moth of the family Noctuidae. It is found in Italy, the Balkan Peninsula and Crete.

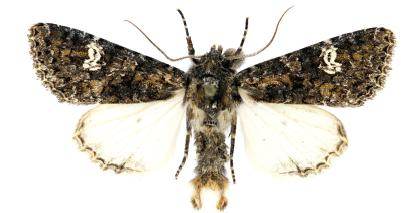
Subspecies minoica Male

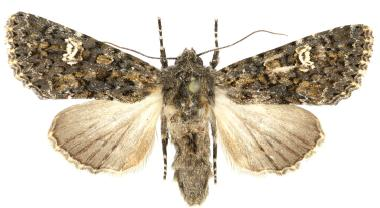
Subspecies minoica Female

The wingspan is about 36 mm. Adults are on wing from October to November.

The larvae feed on various low-growing plants.

== Subspecies ==
- Polymixis serpentina serpentina
- Polymixis serpentina minoica Fibiger, 1992 (Crete)

Polymixis iatnana was formerly treated as a subspecies Polymixis serpentina.
