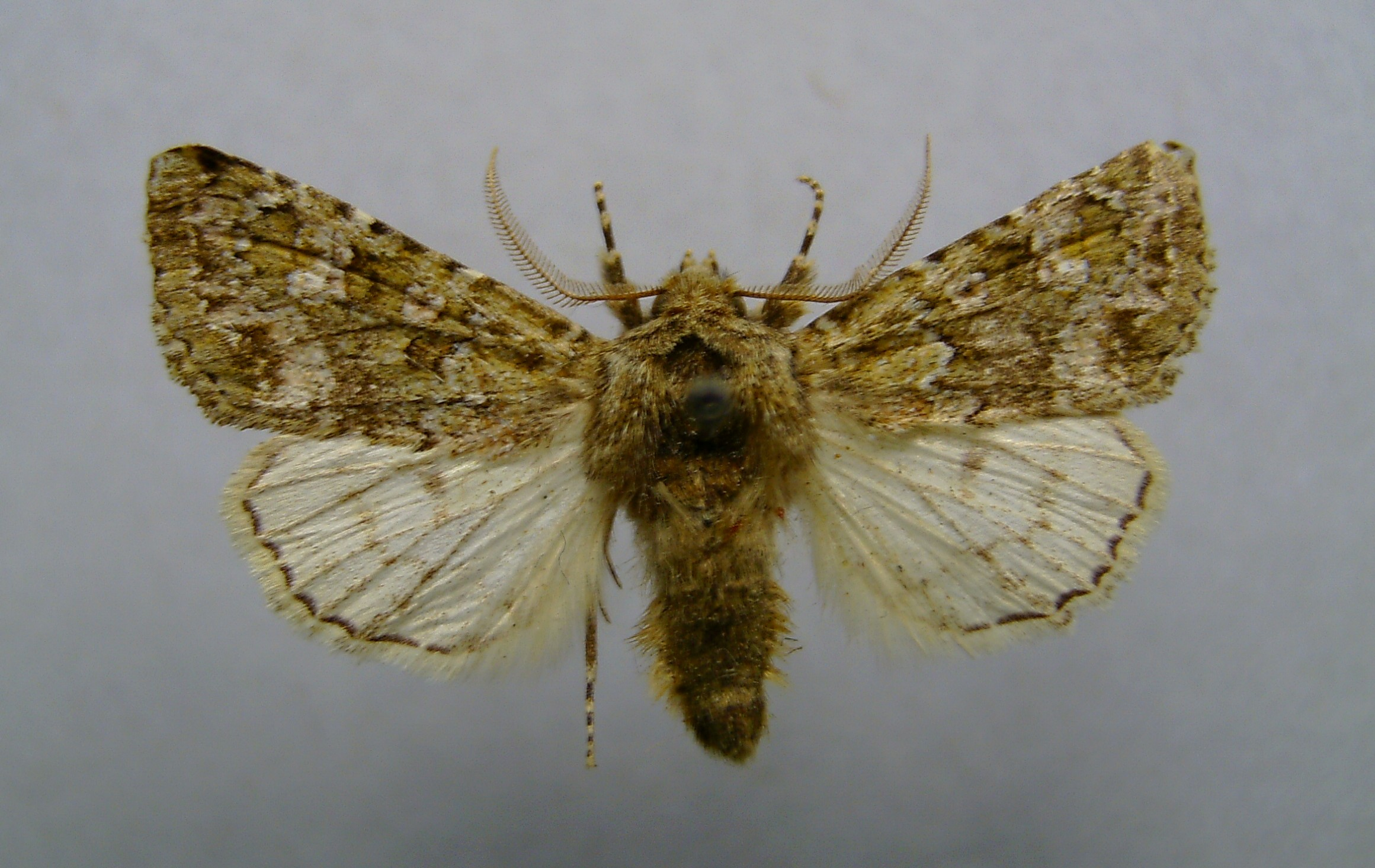

Scientific classification
- Domain: Eukaryota
- Kingdom: Animalia
- Phylum: Arthropoda
- Class: Insecta
- Order: Lepidoptera
- Superfamily: Noctuoidea
- Family: Noctuidae
- Genus: Polymixis
- Species: P. lichenea

Binomial name
- Polymixis lichenea (Hübner, [1813])

Synonyms
- Noctua lichenea Hübner, [1813]; Eumichtis lichenea; Epunda lichenea f. apennina Dannehl, 1929; Eumichtis lichenea scillonea Richardson, 1958; Eumichtis lichenea septentrionalis Lempke, 1964; Epunda lichenea var. aetnea Turati, 1908; Polia viridicincta Freyer, 1831; Noctua tephra Geyer, [1832]; Epunda lichenea mirabilis Rungs, 1940

= Polymixis lichenea =

Species of moth

Polymixis lichenea, the feathered ranunculus, is a moth of the family Noctuidae. It is found in western Europe and Morocco. It is mainly found in coastal areas.

== Technical description and variation ==
The wingspan is 35–40 mm. Forewing dark to light green, varied with reddish along the inner margin and the course of the lines and round the stigmata; inner and outer lines grey, double; submarginal line pale, preceded by rufous wedge shaped marks; claviform stigma small, dark; orbicular and reniform whitish, often dusted with grey, with dark centres and blackish outlines; fringe green; hindwing of male white, of female light or dark grey, with grey discal spot and outer, sometimes also a submarginal, line; in the form viridicincta Frr. the ground colour is grey tinged with olive, the central fascia generally darker olive, all the red tints replaced by dark green; tephra Geyer is a paler grey form with the green tints also obsolete; aetnea Turati, from Sicily, is blackish, the markings on forewing distinct.

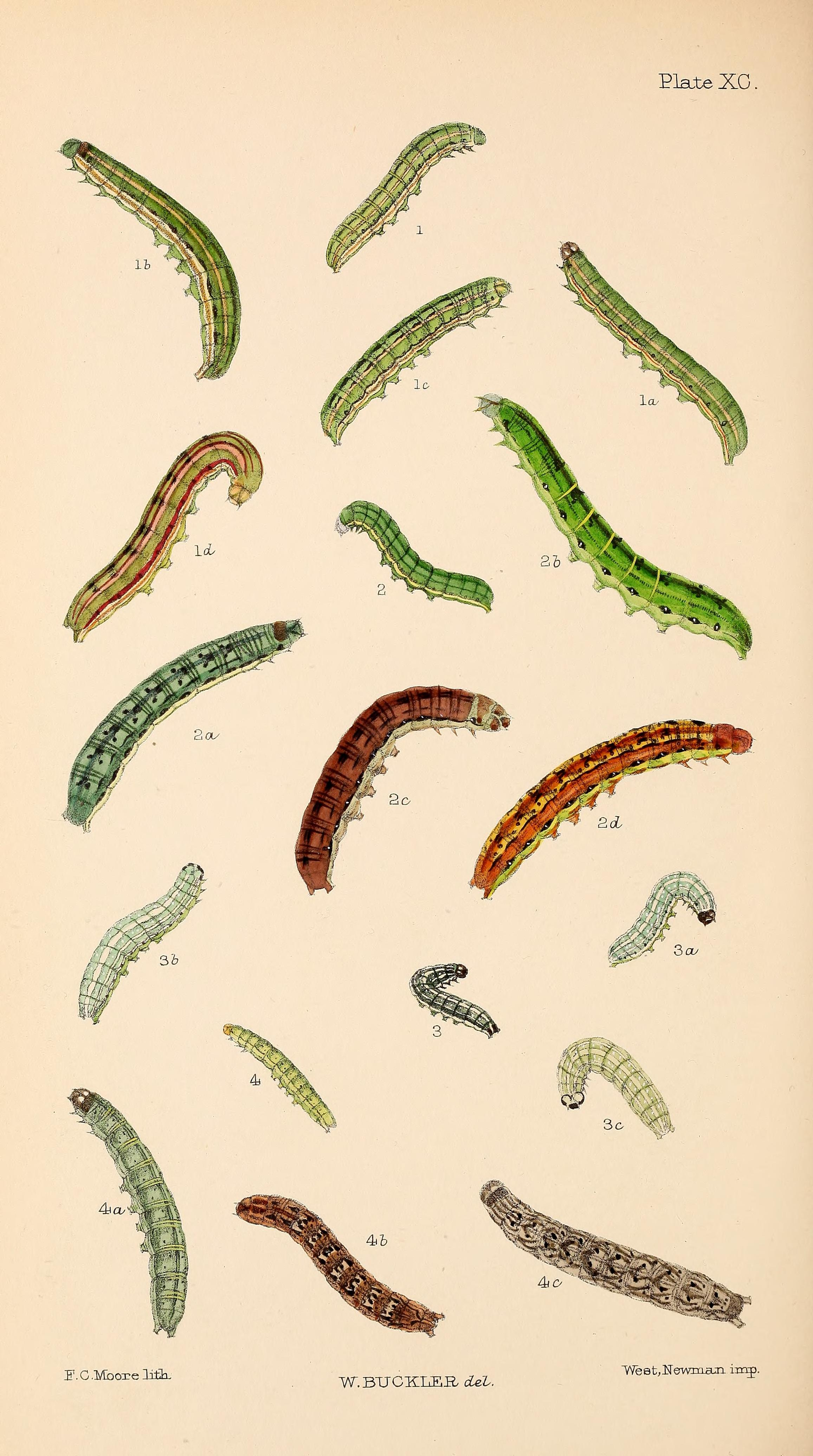
4, 4a, 4b, 4c larvae in various stages of growth

== Biology ==
Adults are on wing from August to October.

Larva pale green or brownish mottled with darker; spiracular line pale; head yellowish. The larvae feed on various low-growing plants, including Sedum acre and Armeria maritima.
