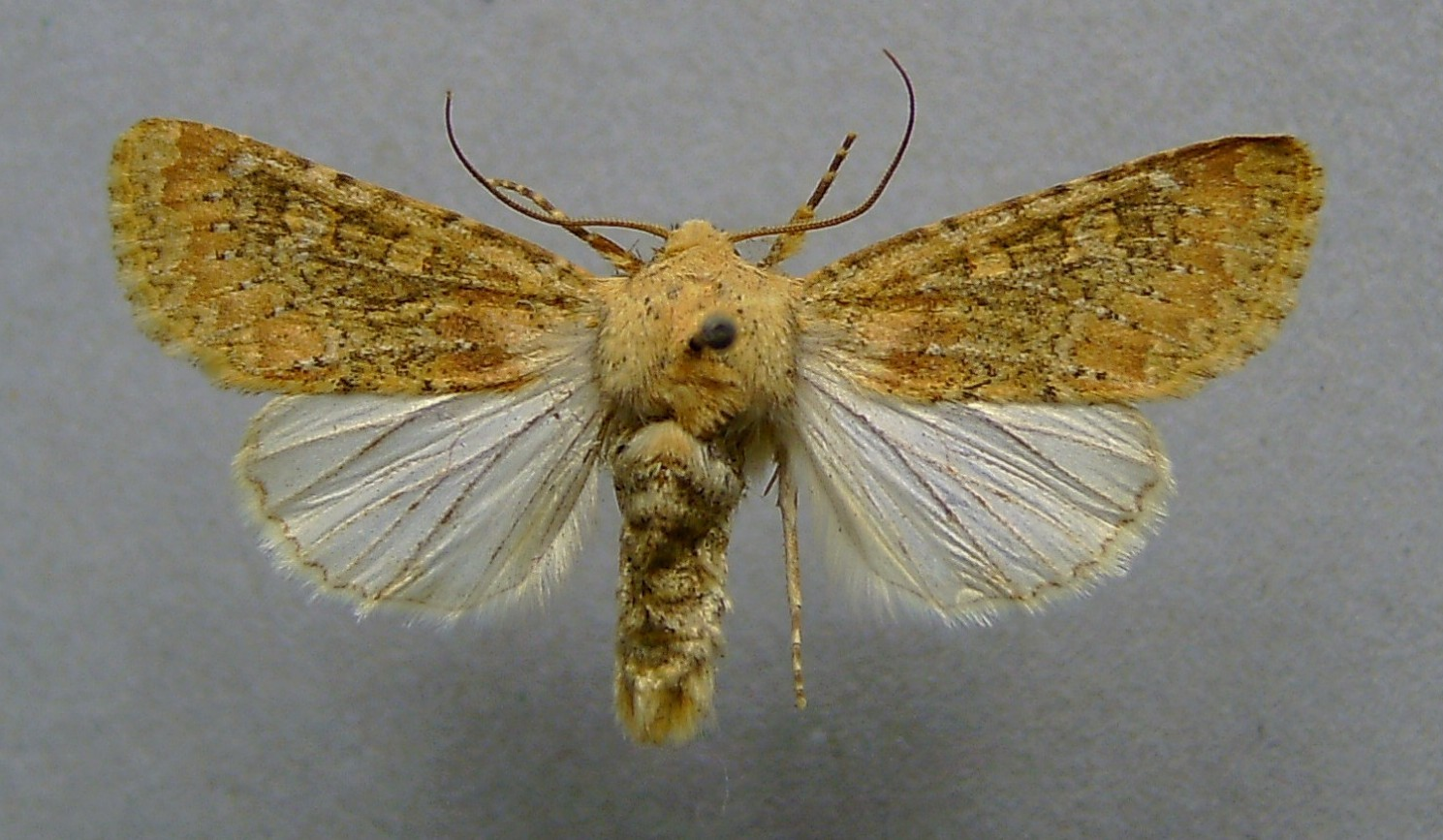

Scientific classification
- Kingdom: Animalia
- Phylum: Arthropoda
- Clade: Pancrustacea
- Class: Insecta
- Order: Lepidoptera
- Superfamily: Noctuoidea
- Family: Noctuidae
- Genus: Polymixis
- Species: P. argillaceago

Binomial name
- Polymixis argillaceago (Hübner, 1822)

Synonyms
- Noctua argillaceago Hübner, [1822]; Polia venusta Boisduval, 1829; Polymixis nigralba Gélin & Lucas, 1914; Polymixis nigrella Gélin & Lucas, 1914

= Polymixis argillaceago =

Species of moth

Polymixis argillaceago is a moth of the family Noctuidae. It is found in south-western Europe and the Maghreb countries.

The wingspan is 34–39 mm. Adults are on wing from September to October in one generation per year.
