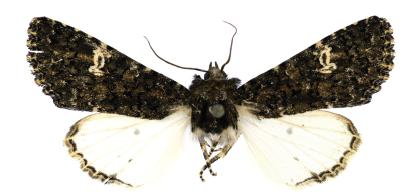
- Male
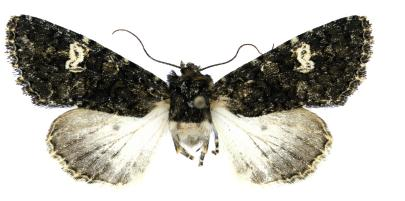
- Female

Scientific classification
- Domain: Eukaryota
- Kingdom: Animalia
- Phylum: Arthropoda
- Class: Insecta
- Order: Lepidoptera
- Superfamily: Noctuoidea
- Family: Noctuidae
- Genus: Polymixis
- Species: P. ivanchiki

Binomial name
- Polymixis ivanchiki Pekarsky, 2012

= Polymixis ivanchiki =

Species of moth

Polymixis ivanchiki is a moth of the family Noctuidae. It is found in the Near East (Israel, Lebanon and south-western Iran) and the southern parts of Turkey (the provinces of Hatay and Urfa).

The wingspan is 38–40 mm. The head, thorax and forewings are dark brownish grey mixed with black hair-like scales. The hindwings are shining white with some black scales on the veins. The discal spot is pale gray and the terminal line is black.

== Etymology ==
The species named in honour of Ukrainian zoologists, Ivanchik Taisiya Semenivna (1937-2007) and Ivanchik Grigoriy Semenovich (1929–2011), teachers of Department of Zoology, Faculty of Biology, Yuriy Fedkovych Chernivtsi National University.
