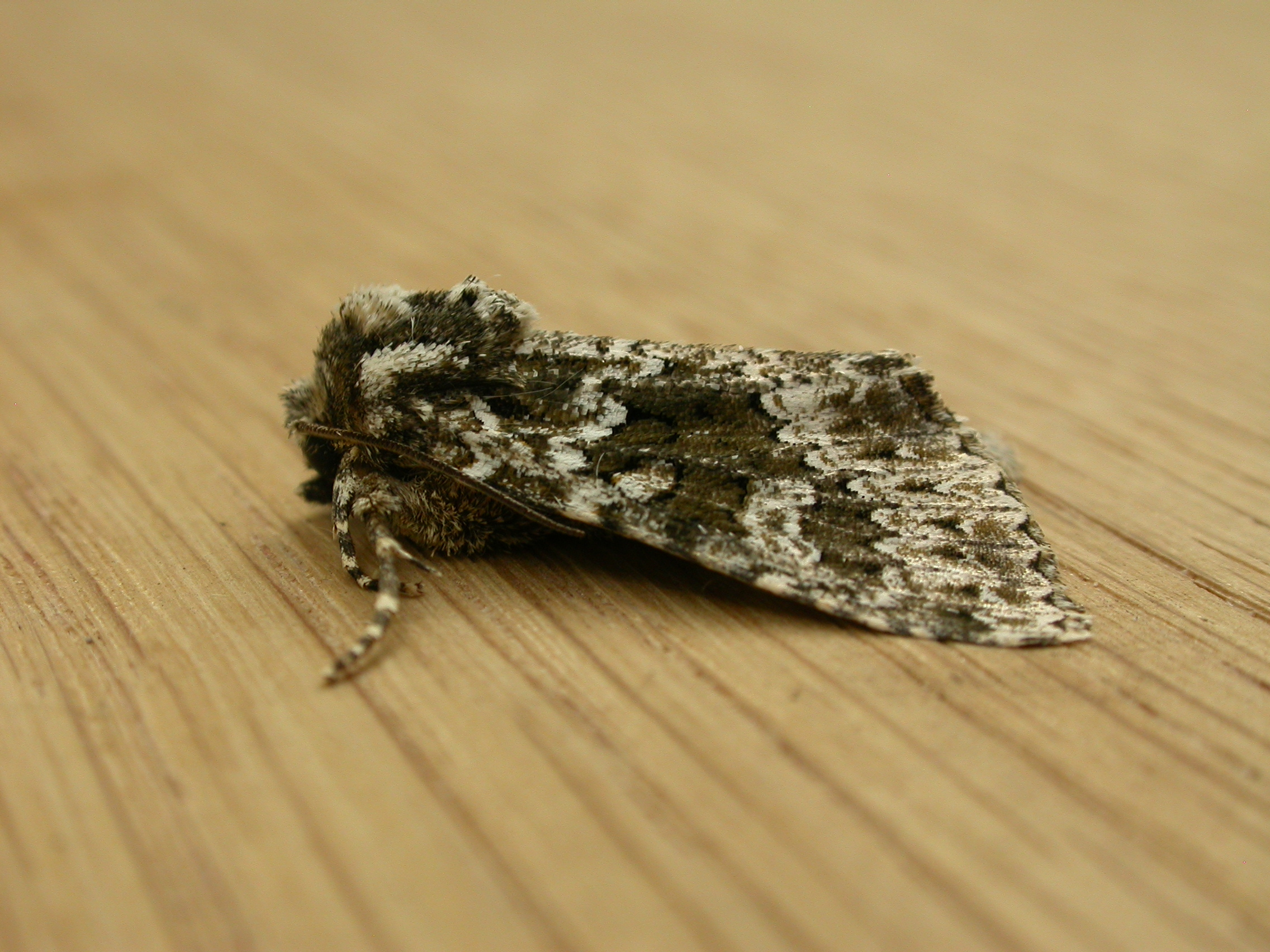
- Polymixis polymita

Scientific classification
- Domain: Eukaryota
- Kingdom: Animalia
- Phylum: Arthropoda
- Class: Insecta
- Order: Lepidoptera
- Superfamily: Noctuoidea
- Family: Noctuidae
- Genus: Polymixis; Hübner, [1820]

= Polymixis =

Genus of moths

Polymixis is a genus of moths in the family Noctuidae.

== Species ==
- Polymixis acharis (Püngeler, 1901)
- Polymixis achrysa Ronkay, Varga & Hreblay, 1998
- Polymixis alaschja Hacker, [1997]
- Polymixis albiorbis Hreblay & Ronkay, 1998
- Polymixis albirena (Boursin, 1944)
- Polymixis ancepsoides Poole, 1989
- Polymixis aphrodite Fibiger, 1997
- Polymixis apora (Staudinger, 1897)
- Polymixis argillaceago (Hübner, [1822])
- Polymixis argillosa (Boursin, 1970)
- Polymixis atossa (Wiltshire, 1941)
- Polymixis aurora (Turati, 1924)
- Polymixis bacheri (Püngeler, 1902)
- Polymixis beata Hreblay & Ronkay, 1998
- Polymixis bischoffi (Herrich-Schäffer, [1850])
- Polymixis boursini (Rungs, 1949)
- Polymixis bousseaui (Lucas, 1934)
- Polymixis calamistis (Hampson, 1906)
- Polymixis carducha (Wiltshire, 1957)
- Polymixis carolina Hacker & Legrain, 1999
- Polymixis chosroes (Brandt, 1938)
- Polymixis chrysographa (Wagner, 1931)
- Polymixis colluta (Draudt, 1934)
- Polymixis csorbagabori Ronkay, Varga & Hreblay, 1998
- Polymixis culoti (Schawerda, 1921)
- Polymixis draudti (Boursin, 1952)
- Polymixis dubia (Duponchel, [1838])
- Polymixis dubiosa (Brandt, 1938)
- Polymixis dyssymetrica (Rungs, 1967)
- Polymixis fabiani Ronkay, Varga & Hreblay, 1998
- Polymixis fiorii (Boursin, 1940)
- Polymixis flavicincta – Large Ranunculus (Denis & Schiffermüller, 1775)
- Polymixis germana (Rothschild, 1914)
- Polymixis gilva Sukhareva, 1976
- Polymixis gracilis (Brandt, 1941)
- Polymixis hedygramma (Brandt, 1941)
- Polymixis himalaya Hacker & Weigert, 1990
- Polymixis iatnana Hacker, 1996
- Polymixis ivanchiki Pekarsky, 2012
- Polymixis juditha (Staudinger, 1897)
- Polymixis latesco Fibiger, 2001
- Polymixis lea (Staudinger, 1897)
- Polymixis leuconota (Frivaldszky, 1841)
- Polymixis lichenea (Hübner, [1813])
- Polymixis longilinea (Draudt, 1950)
- Polymixis magnirena (Alphéraky, 1892)
- Polymixis mandshurica Boursin, 1970
- Polymixis manisadjiani (Staudinger, 1881)
- Polymixis nasamonius (Turati, 1924)
- Polymixis nigrogrisea Hreblay & Ronkay, 1998
- Polymixis omanensis (Boursin, 1970)
- Polymixis pamiridia Boursin, 1967
- Polymixis paravarga Ronkay, 1990
- Polymixis perchrysa Hacker & Ronkay, 1992
- Polymixis pericaspicus Ronkay, Varga & Hreblay, 1998
- Polymixis petrolignea (Draudt, 1950)
- Polymixis philipsi (Püngeler, 1911)
- Polymixis polymita (Linnaeus, 1761)
- Polymixis polymorpha Boursin, 1960
- Polymixis rebecca (Staudinger, 1891)
- Polymixis remota (Püngeler, 1900)
- Polymixis rjabovi (Boursin, 1944)
- Polymixis roehrei (Boursin, 1961)
- Polymixis rosinae (Bohatsch, 1909)
- Polymixis rubrimixta (Hampson, 1906)
- Polymixis rufocincta (Geyer, [1828])
- Polymixis rungsi Plante, 1975
- Polymixis rupicola (Turati, 1934)
- Polymixis schistochlora Ronkay, Varga & Hreblay, 1998
- Polymixis scrophulariae (Wiltshire, 1952)
- Polymixis seposita (Püngeler, 1914)
- Polymixis serpentina (Treitschke, 1825)
- Polymixis shensiana (Draudt, 1950)
- Polymixis stictineura Boursin, 1960
- Polymixis sublutea (Turati, 1909)
- Polymixis subvenusta (Püngeler, 1906)
- Polymixis susica (Rungs, 1950)
- Polymixis trisignata (Ménétriés, 1848)
- Polymixis variabile (Stertz, 1915)
- Polymixis vartianorum (Varga, 1979)
- Polymixis versicolora (Draudt, 1950)
- Polymixis viridinigra Hreblay & Ronkay, 1997
- Polymixis viridula (Staudinger, 1895)
- Polymixis xanthomista (Hübner, [1819])
- Polymixis zagrobia (Wiltshire, 1941)
- Polymixis zophodes Boursin, 1960
