= Galleriinae =

- Tirathaba rufivena of tribe Tirathabini

Scientific classification
- Kingdom: Animalia
- Phylum: Arthropoda
- Clade: Pancrustacea
- Class: Insecta
- Order: Lepidoptera
- Family: Pyralidae
- Subfamily: Galleriinae; Zeller, 1848

Type species
- Phalaena cereana Blom, 1764

Diversity
- 5 tribes (and see text); About 70 genera About 300 species

Synonyms
- Macrothecinae Barnes & McDunnough, 1912

Subfamily of moths

The Galleriinae are a subfamily of snout moths (family Pyralidae) and occur essentially worldwide, in some cases aided by involuntary introduction by humans. This subfamily includes the wax moths, whose caterpillars (waxworms) are bred on a commercial scale as food for pets and as fishing bait; in the wild, these and other species of Galleriinae may also be harmful to humans as pests.

At the species level, they are the least diverse snout moth subfamily according to current knowledge, with 306 described species all together. However, as regards major lineages, the Galleriinae are quite diverse, with five tribes being recognized – more than in the Phycitinae, the most species-rich snout moth subfamily. One of these tribes, the Joelminetiini, has been described only in 2007, and presently contains a single and highly aberrant genus.

== Description and ecology ==
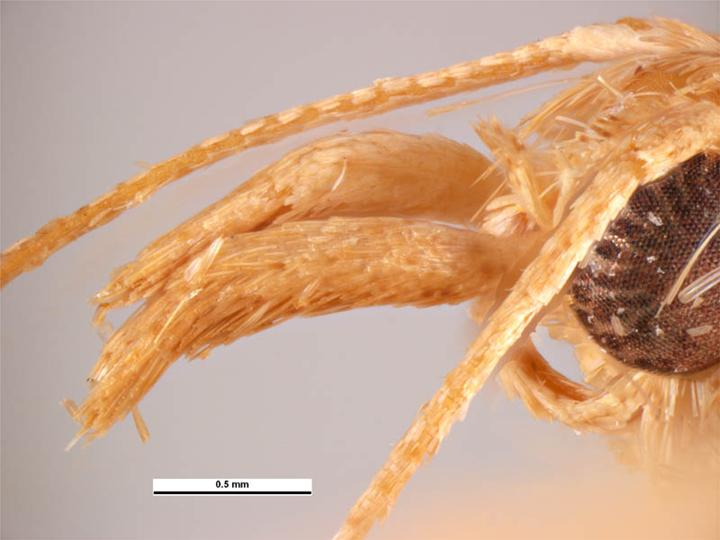
Head of adult female rice moth (Corcyra cephalonica) showing its "snout" scale bar: 0.5 mm

The caterpillar larvae of Galleriinae usually have a sclerotised (hardened) ring around the base of seta SD1 on the first abdominal segment. Their pupae are comparatively easy to distinguish from other snout moths' by a readily apparent midline ridge running along the thorax and abdomen. In the imagines, the gnathos of the male genitalia is reduced to the point of disappearing altogether or (more rarely) with only the barest vestige remaining; this is quite characteristic except for a few Chrysauginae which have convergently lost the gnathos. Males produce very high chirping sounds with their tegulae, in some cases even regular "mating songs", though without specialized bioacoustics equipment this cannot be used for identification. Unusual for Pyralidae, adult Galleriinae may lack ocelli and even the proboscis (which is usually well developed in the family); as typical for the family, however, they usually have large labial palps which form a "snout".

Ecologically, the subfamily is noted for a number of species that coevolved with Hymenoptera, namely Apoidea (bees and relatives). The larvae may be parasites or symbionts, and the adults of such species at least to some degree are inquilines (though usually pursued by the nest inhabitants). Especially notable among these Galleriinae are the waxworms (Achroia and Galleria larvae) which are both significant as beekeeping pests and as commercial items, as well as Aphomia species. Others, especially the rice moth (Corcyra cephalonica) and Paralipsa, are noted pests of stored food products.

== Systematics ==
The diversity of Galleriinae known in the mid-20th century was fully catalogued by P.E.S. Whalley of the UK Natural History Museum, but no dedicated phylogenetic analysis has been conducted. Notwithstanding, such studies exist for the Pyraloidea as a whole, and these indicate that the Galleriinae are a rather primitive lineage of Pyralidae, comparable to the Chrysauginae. The latter may be the closest living relatives of the Galleriinae, or an independent but equally ancient snout moth lineage that simply looks similar due to sharing many plesiomorphic traits.

The Galleriinae are currently divided into five tribes, though this may change eventually. For one thing, some genera are presently insufficiently studied or too aberrant to be firmly assignable to any one tribe; for another, in the absence of detailed phylogenetic studies the best systematic treatment for members of this subfamily remains a best guess. Furthermore, not all Galleriinae are known to science; new species and genera continue to be discovered. A supposed additional tribe ("Macrothecini") is based on a misidentified specimen of Cacotherapia interalbicalis; on the other hand the genus Joelminetia, of which the first specimens reached the hands of researchers only in the 1990s, turned out to be so distinct as to warrant establishment of its own monotypic tribe.

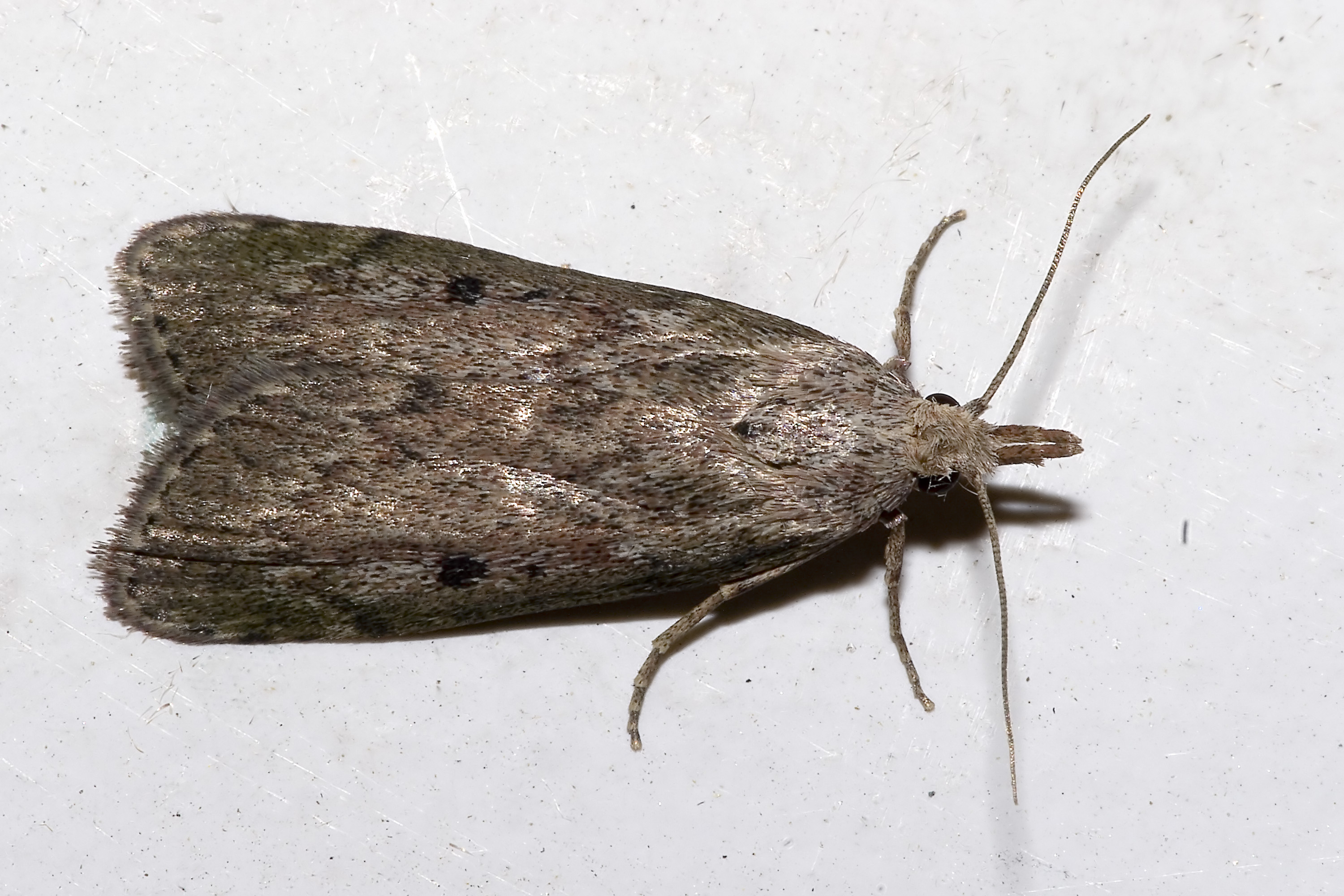
Adult bee moth (Aphomia sociella) of the Tirathabini

The tribes and genera – with some significant species also noted – in this subfamily are:

Cacotherapiini Munroe, 1995 (= Macrothecini)

- Alpheias Ragonot, 1891
- Alpheioides Barnes & McDunnough, 1912
- Cacotherapia Dyar, 1904
- Decaturia Barnes & McDunnough, 1912
- Genopaschia Dyar, 1914

Galleriini Zeller, 1848

- Achroia
- Cathayia Hampson in Ragonot, 1901
- Chevalierella Ghesquière, 1943
- Eloeidiphilos Praviel, 1938
- Galleria – greater wax moth, honeycomb moth
- Trachylepidia Ragonot, 1887

Joelminetiini Speidel & Witt, 2007

- Joelminetia Speidel & Witt, 2007

Megarthridiini Whalley, 1964

- Cataprosopus Butler, 1881
- Eulophopalpia Inoue, 1982
- Megarthridia Martin, 1956
- Omphalocera Lederer, 1863
  - Omphalocera munroei – asimina webworm
- Perinetoides Marion, 1955
- Sphinctocera Warren, 1897
- Thyridopyralis Dyar, 1901

Tirathabini Whalley, 1964

- Acracona
- Acyperas
- Antiptilotis Meyrick, 1897
- Aphomia
- Bapara Walker, 1865
- Callionyma Meyrick, 1882
  - Callionyma sarcodes
- Ceratothalama Meyrick, 1932
- Corcyra – rice moth
- Cristia Whalley, 1964
- Doloessa Zeller, 1848
- Eldana
- Epimorius Zeller, 1877
- Ertzica Walker, 1866
- Ethopia Walker, 1865
- Galleristhenia Hampson, 1917
- Heteromicta Meyrick, 1886
  - Heteromicta pachytera
- Hypolophota Turner, 1904
- Lamoria
- Mampava Ragonot, 1888
- Mecistophylla Turner, 1937
- Metaraphia Hampson in Ragonot, 1901
- Meyriccia Hampson, 1917
- Microchlora Hampson in Ragonot, 1901
- Neoepimorius Whalley, 1964
- Neophrida Möschler, 1882
- Paralipsa Butler, 1879
  - Paralipsa gularis – stored nut moth
- Paraphomia Hampson in Ragonot, 1901
- Parazanclodes Hampson in Ragonot, 1901
- Paroxyptera Ragonot, 1901
- Picrogama Meyrick, 1897
- Pocopaschia Dyar, 1914
- Pogrima Schaus, 1940
- Prasinoxena Meyrick, 1894
- Proropoca Hampson, 1916
- Prosthenia Hampson in Ragonot, 1901
- Schistotheca Ragonot, 1882
- Statia Ragonot, 1901
- Stenachroia Hampson, 1898
- Stenopaschia Hampson, 1906
- Thalamorrhyncha Meyrick, 1933
- Tirathaba Walker, 1864
- Xenophasma Dognin, 1905

incertae sedis

- Gallerites Kernbach, 1967
- Marisba Walker, 1863
- Rhectophlebia Ragonot, 1888
- Yxygodes Viette, 1989
