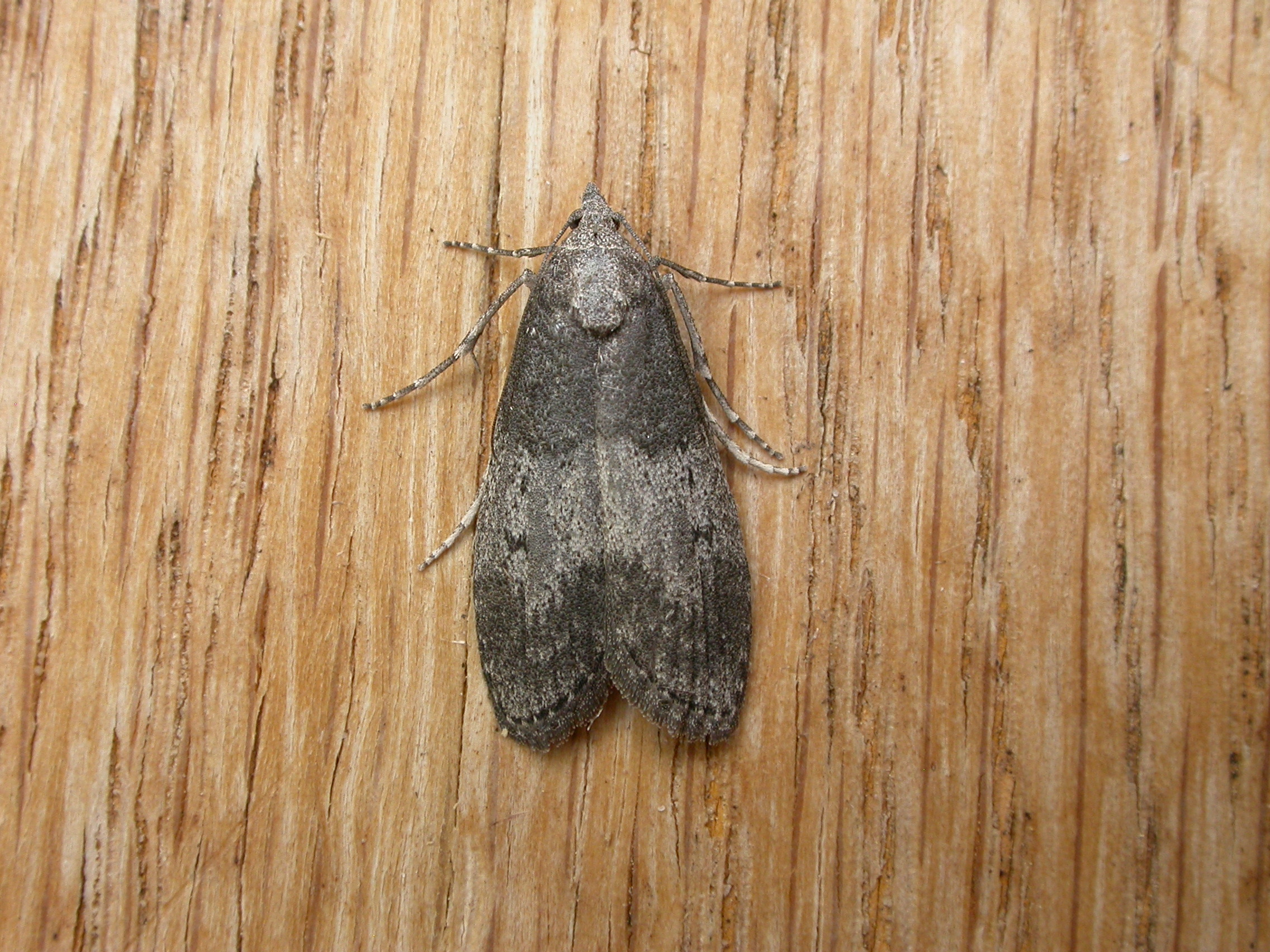
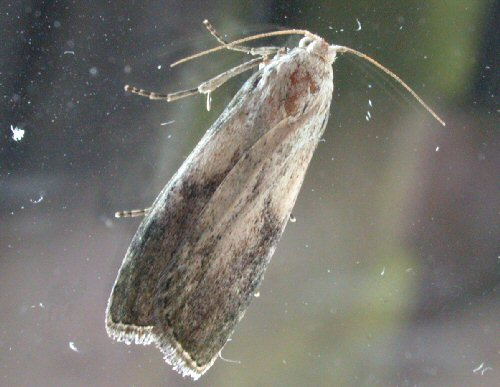
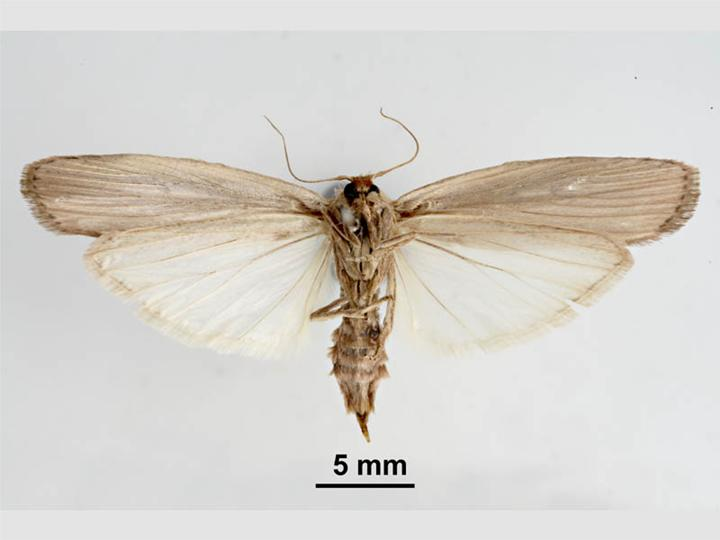

Scientific classification
- Kingdom: Animalia
- Phylum: Arthropoda
- Clade: Pancrustacea
- Class: Insecta
- Order: Lepidoptera
- Family: Pyralidae
- Subfamily: Galleriinae
- Tribe: Tirathabini; Whalley, 1964

= Tirathabini =

Tribe in the Galleriinae subfamily

Tirathabini is a tribe in the Galleriinae subfamily of pyralid moths.

The name "Tirathabini" originated from the genus in the tribe Tirathaba by adding the suffix "-ini".

Tirathabini contains 41 genera:

- Acracona
- Acyperas
- Antiptilotis
- Aphomia
- Bapara
- Callionyma
- Ceratothalama
- Corcyra
- Cristia
- Doloessa
- Eldana
- Epimorius
- Ertzica
- Ethopia
- Galleristhenia
- Heteromicta
- Hypolophota
- Lamoria
- Mampava
- Mecistophylla
- Metaraphia
- Meyriccia
- Meyriccia
- Neoepimorius
- Neophrida
- Paralipsa
- Paraphomia
- Parazanclodes
- Paroxyptera
- Picrogama
- Pogrima
- Pocopaschia
- Proropoca
- Prasinoxena
- Prosthenia
- Schistotheca
- Statia
- Stenachroia
- Thalamorrhyncha
- Tirathaba
- Xenophasma
