= Ethopia gigantea =

Scientific classification
- Kingdom: Animalia
- Phylum: Arthropoda
- Class: Insecta
- Order: Lepidoptera
- Family: Pyralidae
- Genus: Ethopia
- Species: E. gigantea

Binomial name
- Ethopia gigantea Owada, 1986

Species of moth

Ethopia gigantea is a species of snout moth in the genus Ethopia. It was described by Owada in 1986, and is known from the Philippines.
