= Epimorius cymonia =

Scientific classification
- Kingdom: Animalia
- Phylum: Arthropoda
- Class: Insecta
- Order: Lepidoptera
- Family: Pyralidae
- Genus: Epimorius
- Species: E. cymonia

Binomial name
- Epimorius cymonia (Schaus, 1913)

Synonyms
- Athaliptis cymonia Schaus, 1913

Species of moth

Epimorius cymonia is a species of snout moth. It was described by Schaus in 1913, and is known from Costa Rica.
