= Neoepimorius maroni =

Scientific classification
- Kingdom: Animalia
- Phylum: Arthropoda
- Class: Insecta
- Order: Lepidoptera
- Family: Pyralidae
- Genus: Neoepimorius
- Species: N. maroni

Binomial name
- Neoepimorius maroni Whalley, 1964

Species of moth

Neoepimorius maroni is a species of snout moth in the genus Neoepimorius. It was described by Paul Whalley in 1964. It is found in French Guiana.
