= Lamoria attamasca =

Scientific classification
- Domain: Eukaryota
- Kingdom: Animalia
- Phylum: Arthropoda
- Class: Insecta
- Order: Lepidoptera
- Family: Pyralidae
- Genus: Lamoria
- Species: L. attamasca

Binomial name
- Lamoria attamasca Whalley, 1964

Species of moth

Lamoria attamasca is a species of snout moth in the genus Lamoria. It was described by Whalley in 1964, and is known from South Africa.
