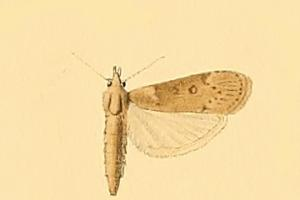

Scientific classification
- Domain: Eukaryota
- Kingdom: Animalia
- Phylum: Arthropoda
- Class: Insecta
- Order: Lepidoptera
- Family: Pyralidae
- Genus: Lamoria
- Species: L. jordanis

Binomial name
- Lamoria jordanis Ragonot, 1901

= Lamoria jordanis =

Species of moth

Lamoria jordanis is a species of snout moth. It is found in Spain, Israel and the Palestinian Territories.

The wingspan is about 33 mm.
