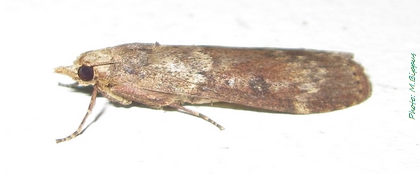
- Lamoria clathrella

Scientific classification
- Kingdom: Animalia
- Phylum: Arthropoda
- Clade: Pancrustacea
- Class: Insecta
- Order: Lepidoptera
- Family: Pyralidae
- Subfamily: Galleriinae
- Tribe: Tirathabini
- Genus: Lamoria; Walker, 1863

Type species
- Lamoria planalis Walker, 1863

Synonyms
- Hornigia Ragonot, 1885; Lammoria (lapsus); Microcyttara Turner, 1913; Maraclea Walker, 1863; Tugela Ragonot, 1888

= Lamoria =

Genus of moth

Lamoria is a genus of small moths belonging to the family Pyralidae.

== Description ==
The palpi of the male are minute, whereas those of the female project about the length of head and are downcurved at their extremity. Maxillary palpi filiform. Frons with a conical tuft. Antennae simple. Forewings of male with a large glandular swelling at base of costa below. Vein 3 from before angle of cell. Veins 4 and 5 from angle, which is much produced. Veins 8 and 9 stalked from vein 7. Veins 10 and 11 free. Female with vein 3 from angle of cell, which is not produced. Veins 4 and 5 stalked. Hindwings with open cell. Veins 2, 3, 4 and 5 at regular intervals. Vein 7 anastomosing (fusing) with vein 8.

== Species ==
- Lamoria adaptella (Walker, 1863)
- Lamoria anella (Denis & Schiffermüller, 1775)
- Lamoria attamasca Whalley, 1964
- Lamoria baea (West, 1931)
- Lamoria brevinaevella Zerny, 1934
- Lamoria cafrella (Ragonot, 1888)
- Lamoria clathrella (Ragonot, 1888)
- Lamoria eumeces (Turner, 1913)
- Lamoria exiguata Whalley, 1964
- Lamoria fumidea Whalley, 1964
- Lamoria glaucalis Caradja, 1925
- Lamoria hemi Rose, 1981
- Lamoria idiolepida Turner, 1922
- Lamoria imbella (Walker, 1864)
- Lamoria infumatella Hampson, 1898
- Lamoria inostentalis (Walker, 1863)
- Lamoria jordanis Ragonot, 1901
- Lamoria medianalis Hampson, 1917
- Lamoria melanophlebia Ragonot, 1888
- Lamoria oenochroa (Turner, 1905)
- Lamoria pachylepidella Hampson, 1901
- Lamoria pallens Whalley, 1964
- Lamoria ruficostella Ragonot, 1888
- Lamoria surrufa Whalley, 1964
- Lamoria virescens Hampson, 1898

The former L. rufivena is now Tirathaba rufivena.
