= Lamoria eumeces =

Scientific classification
- Domain: Eukaryota
- Kingdom: Animalia
- Phylum: Arthropoda
- Class: Insecta
- Order: Lepidoptera
- Family: Pyralidae
- Genus: Lamoria
- Species: L. eumeces

Binomial name
- Lamoria eumeces (Turner, 1913)

Synonyms
- Microcyttara eumeces Turner, 1913

Species of moth

Lamoria eumeces is a species of snout moth in the genus Lamoria. It was described by Turner in 1913. It is found in Australia.
