= Neophrida meterythralis =

Scientific classification
- Kingdom: Animalia
- Phylum: Arthropoda
- Class: Insecta
- Order: Lepidoptera
- Family: Pyralidae
- Genus: Neophrida
- Species: N. meterythralis

Binomial name
- Neophrida meterythralis Hampson, 1916

Species of moth

Neophrida meterythralis is a species of snout moth in the genus Neophrida. It was described by George Hampson in 1916 and is known from Venezuela.
