= Lamoria fumidea =

Scientific classification
- Domain: Eukaryota
- Kingdom: Animalia
- Phylum: Arthropoda
- Class: Insecta
- Order: Lepidoptera
- Family: Pyralidae
- Genus: Lamoria
- Species: L. fumidea

Binomial name
- Lamoria fumidea Whalley, 1964

Species of moth

Lamoria fumidea is a species of snout moth in the genus Lamoria. It was described by Paul Whalley in 1964, and is found in China.
