= Lamoria baea =

Scientific classification
- Domain: Eukaryota
- Kingdom: Animalia
- Phylum: Arthropoda
- Class: Insecta
- Order: Lepidoptera
- Family: Pyralidae
- Genus: Lamoria
- Species: L. baea

Binomial name
- Lamoria baea (West, 1931)

Synonyms
- Pempelia baea West, 1931

Species of moth

Lamoria baea is a species of snout moth in the genus Lamoria. It was described by West in 1931, and is found in the Philippines.
