= Lamoria inostentalis =

Scientific classification
- Kingdom: Animalia
- Phylum: Arthropoda
- Class: Insecta
- Order: Lepidoptera
- Family: Pyralidae
- Genus: Lamoria
- Species: L. inostentalis

Binomial name
- Lamoria inostentalis (Walker, 1863)

Synonyms
- Maraclea inostentalis Walker, 1863

Species of moth

Lamoria inostentalis is a species of snout moth in the genus Lamoria. It was described by Francis Walker in 1863. It is found in Malaysia.
