= Heteromicta sordidella =

Scientific classification
- Kingdom: Animalia
- Phylum: Arthropoda
- Class: Insecta
- Order: Lepidoptera
- Family: Pyralidae
- Genus: Heteromicta
- Species: H. sordidella

Binomial name
- Heteromicta sordidella (Walker, 1866)

Synonyms
- Gyrtona sordidella Walker, 1866

Species of moth

Heteromicta sordidella is a species of snout moth in the genus Heteromicta. It was described by Francis Walker in 1866. It is found in Australia (including Western Australia and New South Wales).
