= Alpheias bipunctalis =

Scientific classification
- Kingdom: Animalia
- Phylum: Arthropoda
- Class: Insecta
- Order: Lepidoptera
- Family: Pyralidae
- Genus: Alpheias
- Species: A. bipunctalis

Binomial name
- Alpheias bipunctalis Hampson, 1919

Species of mouth

Alpheias bipunctalis is a species of snout moth in the genus Alpheias. It was described by George Hampson in 1919 and is known from Jamaica.
