= Prasinoxena monospila =

Scientific classification
- Kingdom: Animalia
- Phylum: Arthropoda
- Class: Insecta
- Order: Lepidoptera
- Family: Pyralidae
- Genus: Prasinoxena
- Species: P. monospila

Binomial name
- Prasinoxena monospila Meyrick, 1894

Species of moth

Prasinoxena monospila is a species of moth in the family Pyralidae first described by Edward Meyrick in 1894. It is found in Borneo.

It is the type species of the genus Prasinoxena.
