= Neophrida aurolimbalis =

Scientific classification
- Kingdom: Animalia
- Phylum: Arthropoda
- Class: Insecta
- Order: Lepidoptera
- Family: Pyralidae
- Genus: Neophrida
- Species: N. aurolimbalis

Binomial name
- Neophrida aurolimbalis Möschler, 1882

Species of moth

Neophrida aurolimbalis is a species of snout moth in the genus Neophrida. It was described by Heinrich Benno Möschler in 1882 and is known from Suriname.
