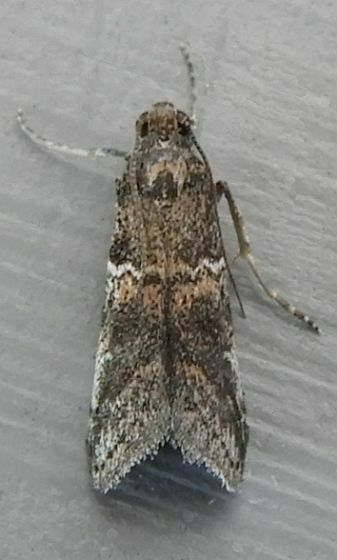

Scientific classification
- Kingdom: Animalia
- Phylum: Arthropoda
- Class: Insecta
- Order: Lepidoptera
- Family: Pyralidae
- Genus: Alpheias
- Species: A. transferens

Binomial name
- Alpheias transferens Dyar, 1913

= Alpheias transferens =

Species of moth

Alpheias transferens is a species of snout moth in the genus Alpheias. It was described by Harrison Gray Dyar Jr. in 1913 and is known from the US state of California.
