= Lamoria glaucalis =

Scientific classification
- Domain: Eukaryota
- Kingdom: Animalia
- Phylum: Arthropoda
- Class: Insecta
- Order: Lepidoptera
- Family: Pyralidae
- Genus: Lamoria
- Species: L. glaucalis

Binomial name
- Lamoria glaucalis Caradja, 1925

Species of moth

Lamoria glaucalis is a species of snout moth in the genus Lamoria. It was described by Aristide Caradja in 1925. It is found in China.
