= Ertzica morosella =

Scientific classification
- Kingdom: Animalia
- Phylum: Arthropoda
- Class: Insecta
- Order: Lepidoptera
- Family: Pyralidae
- Genus: Ertzica
- Species: E. morosella

Binomial name
- Ertzica morosella (Walker, 1863)

Synonyms
- Acara morosella Walker, 1863; Ertzica maximella Walker, 1866; Galleria macroptera Snellen, 1880; Acara impunctella Sauber, 1902

Species of moth

Ertzica morosella is a species of snout moth (family Pyralidae) in the genus Ertzica. It was described by Francis Walker in 1863 and is known from Indonesia (including Java and Sulawesi), India, Sri Lanka and the Philippines.

== Description ==
The wingspan is about 50 mm in the male and 56–88 mm in the female. It is a pale reddish-brown moth. Abdomen suffused with fuscous. Forewings irrorated (sprinkled) with fuscous. Traces of an antemedial line, oblique from costa to below median nervure, where it is angled. A dark speck in the end of the cell and a discocellular speck. There is an indistinct minutely dentate postmedial line excurved between veins 5 and 2. A marginal black specks series present. Hindwings very dark brown with grey-tipped cilia.
