= Hypolophota amydrastis =

Scientific classification
- Kingdom: Animalia
- Phylum: Arthropoda
- Class: Insecta
- Order: Lepidoptera
- Family: Pyralidae
- Genus: Hypolophota
- Species: H. amydrastis

Binomial name
- Hypolophota amydrastis Turner, 1904

Synonyms
- Mucialla macromorpha Lower, 1907

Species of moth

Hypolophota amydrastis is a species of snout moth in the genus Hypolophota. It was described by Alfred Jefferis Turner in 1904 and is known from Australia (including Queensland).
