= Mecistophylla ebenopasta =

Scientific classification
- Domain: Eukaryota
- Kingdom: Animalia
- Phylum: Arthropoda
- Class: Insecta
- Order: Lepidoptera
- Family: Pyralidae
- Genus: Mecistophylla
- Species: M. ebenopasta

Binomial name
- Mecistophylla ebenopasta (Turner, 1904)

Synonyms
- Anerastidia ebenopasta Turner, 1904

Species of moth

Mecistophylla ebenopasta is a species of snout moth in the genus Mecistophylla. It was described by Turner in 1904, and is known from Queensland, Australia.
