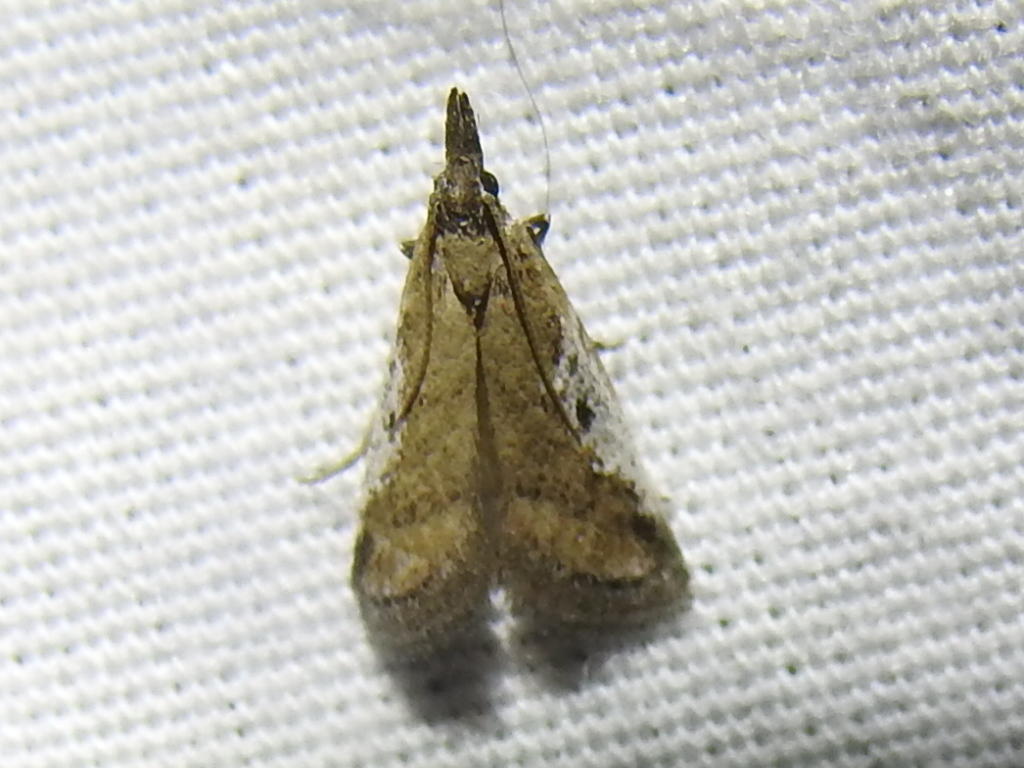

Scientific classification
- Kingdom: Animalia
- Phylum: Arthropoda
- Class: Insecta
- Order: Lepidoptera
- Family: Pyralidae
- Genus: Alpheias
- Species: A. oculiferalis

Binomial name
- Alpheias oculiferalis (Ragonot, 1891)

Synonyms
- Amestria oculiferalis Ragonot, 1891

= Alpheias oculiferalis =

Species of moth

Alpheias oculiferalis is a species of snout moth in the genus Alpheias. It was described by Émile Louis Ragonot, in 1891, and is known from the US state of Texas.
