= Heteromicta leucospila =

Scientific classification
- Domain: Eukaryota
- Kingdom: Animalia
- Phylum: Arthropoda
- Class: Insecta
- Order: Lepidoptera
- Family: Pyralidae
- Genus: Heteromicta
- Species: H. leucospila

Binomial name
- Heteromicta leucospila (Lower, 1907)

Synonyms
- Mucialla leucospila Lower, 1907

Species of moth

Heteromicta leucospila is a species of snout moth in the genus Heteromicta. It was described by Oswald Bertram Lower in 1907 and is known from Queensland, Australia.
