= Lamoria surrufa =

Scientific classification
- Kingdom: Animalia
- Phylum: Arthropoda
- Class: Insecta
- Order: Lepidoptera
- Family: Pyralidae
- Genus: Lamoria
- Species: L. surrufa

Binomial name
- Lamoria surrufa Whalley, 1964

Species of moth

Lamoria surrufa is a species of snout moth. It is found in Cameroon and the Democratic Republic of Congo.
