= Prasinoxena astroteles =

Scientific classification
- Kingdom: Animalia
- Phylum: Arthropoda
- Class: Insecta
- Order: Lepidoptera
- Family: Pyralidae
- Genus: Prasinoxena
- Species: P. astroteles

Binomial name
- Prasinoxena astroteles Meyrick, 1938

Species of moth

Prasinoxena astroteles is a species of moth in the family Pyralidae first described by Edward Meyrick in 1938. It was found on Java.
