= Hypolophota oodes =

Scientific classification
- Kingdom: Animalia
- Phylum: Arthropoda
- Class: Insecta
- Order: Lepidoptera
- Family: Pyralidae
- Genus: Hypolophota
- Species: H. oodes

Binomial name
- Hypolophota oodes Turner, 1904

Synonyms
- Mucialla crypsimera Lower, 1907

Species of moth

Hypolophota oodes is a species of snout moth in the genus Hypolophota. It was described by Turner in 1904, and is known from Australia (including Queensland).
