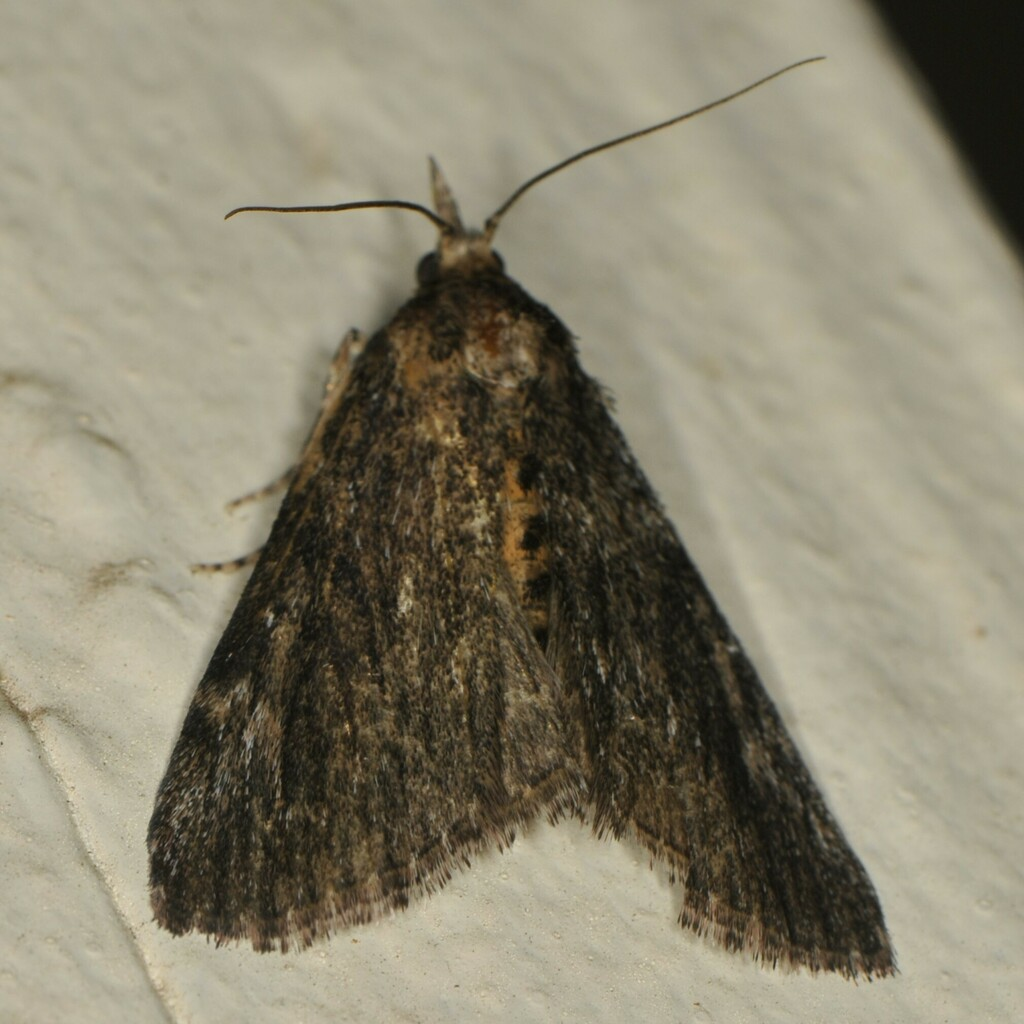

Scientific classification
- Kingdom: Animalia
- Phylum: Arthropoda
- Class: Insecta
- Order: Lepidoptera
- Family: Pyralidae
- Genus: Omphalocera
- Species: O. occidentalis

Binomial name
- Omphalocera occidentalis Barnes & Benjamin, 1924

= Omphalocera occidentalis =

Species of moth

Omphalocera occidentalis is a species of snout moth in the genus Omphalocera. It was described by William Barnes and Foster Hendrickson Benjamin in 1924 and is known from the US states of Nevada, Arizona and New Mexico.

The wingspan is about 42 mm for females and 34 mm for males.
