= Epimorius caribellus =

Scientific classification
- Kingdom: Animalia
- Phylum: Arthropoda
- Class: Insecta
- Order: Lepidoptera
- Family: Pyralidae
- Genus: Epimorius
- Species: E. caribellus

Binomial name
- Epimorius caribellus Ferguson, 1991

Species of moth

Epimorius caribellus is a species of snout moth in the genus Epimorius. It was described by Douglas C. Ferguson in 1991 and is known from Dominica.
