= Microchlora eariasella =

Scientific classification
- Kingdom: Animalia
- Phylum: Arthropoda
- Class: Insecta
- Order: Lepidoptera
- Family: Pyralidae
- Genus: Microchlora
- Species: M. eariasella

Binomial name
- Microchlora eariasella Hampson in Ragonot, 1901

Species of moth

Microchlora eariasella is a species of snout moth in the genus Microchlora. It was described by George Hampson in 1901 and is known from the Malay Archipelago and Indonesia.
