= Lamoria brevinaevella =

Scientific classification
- Domain: Eukaryota
- Kingdom: Animalia
- Phylum: Arthropoda
- Class: Insecta
- Order: Lepidoptera
- Family: Pyralidae
- Genus: Lamoria
- Species: L. brevinaevella

Binomial name
- Lamoria brevinaevella Zerny, 1934

Species of moth

Lamoria brevinaevella is a species of snout moth in the genus Lamoria. It was described by Zerny in 1934, and is known from Lebanon.
