= Mecistophylla amechanica =

Scientific classification
- Domain: Eukaryota
- Kingdom: Animalia
- Phylum: Arthropoda
- Class: Insecta
- Order: Lepidoptera
- Family: Pyralidae
- Genus: Mecistophylla
- Species: M. amechanica

Binomial name
- Mecistophylla amechanica Turner, 1942

Species of moth

Mecistophylla amechanica is a species of snout moth in the genus Mecistophylla. It was described by Turner in 1942 in Queensland, Australia.
