= Alpheias conspirata =

Scientific classification
- Kingdom: Animalia
- Phylum: Arthropoda
- Class: Insecta
- Order: Lepidoptera
- Family: Pyralidae
- Genus: Alpheias
- Species: A. conspirata

Binomial name
- Alpheias conspirata Heinrich, 1940

Species of moth

Alpheias conspirata is a species of snout moth in the genus Alpheias. It was described by Carl Heinrich in 1940 and is known from Mexico.
