= Cataprosopus chalybopicta =

Scientific classification
- Kingdom: Animalia
- Phylum: Arthropoda
- Class: Insecta
- Order: Lepidoptera
- Family: Pyralidae
- Genus: Cataprosopus
- Species: C. chalybopicta

Binomial name
- Cataprosopus chalybopicta (Warren, 1896)

Synonyms
- Lophopalpia chalybopicta Warren, 1896

Species of moth

Cataprosopus chalybopicta is a species of snout moth in the genus Cataprosopus. It was described by William Warren in 1896 and is known from India.
