= Neoepimorius lineola =

Scientific classification
- Kingdom: Animalia
- Phylum: Arthropoda
- Class: Insecta
- Order: Lepidoptera
- Family: Pyralidae
- Genus: Neoepimorius
- Species: N. lineola

Binomial name
- Neoepimorius lineola Whalley, 1964

Species of moth

Neoepimorius lineola is a species of snout moth in the genus Neoepimorius. It was described by Whalley in 1964, and is known from Brazil (including São Paulo, the type location).
