= Cataprosopus melli =

Scientific classification
- Kingdom: Animalia
- Phylum: Arthropoda
- Class: Insecta
- Order: Lepidoptera
- Family: Pyralidae
- Genus: Cataprosopus
- Species: C. melli

Binomial name
- Cataprosopus melli Caradja & Meyrick, 1933

Species of moth

Cataprosopus melli is a species of snout moth in the genus Cataprosopus. It was described by Aristide Caradja and Edward Meyrick in 1933 and is known from China.
