= Epimorius prodigiosa =

Scientific classification
- Kingdom: Animalia
- Phylum: Arthropoda
- Clade: Pancrustacea
- Class: Insecta
- Order: Lepidoptera
- Family: Pyralidae
- Genus: Epimorius
- Species: E. prodigiosa

Binomial name
- Epimorius prodigiosa Whalley, 1964

Species of moth

Epimorius prodigiosa is a species of snout moth, family Pyralidae. It was described by Paul E.S. Whalley in 1964 and is known from Peru.
