= Heteromicta melanomochla =

Scientific classification
- Kingdom: Animalia
- Phylum: Arthropoda
- Class: Insecta
- Order: Lepidoptera
- Family: Pyralidae
- Genus: Heteromicta
- Species: H. melanomochla

Binomial name
- Heteromicta melanomochla (Hampson, 1917)

Synonyms
- Aphomia melanomochla Hampson, 1917

Species of moth

Heteromicta melanomochla is a species of snout moth in the genus Heteromicta. It was described by George Hampson in 1917 and is known from Australia.
