= Mecistophylla =

Scientific classification
- Domain: Eukaryota
- Kingdom: Animalia
- Phylum: Arthropoda
- Class: Insecta
- Order: Lepidoptera
- Family: Pyralidae
- Subfamily: Galleriinae
- Tribe: Tirathabini
- Genus: Mecistophylla; Turner, 1937

Genus of moths

Mecistophylla is a genus of snout moths. It was described by Alfred Jefferis Turner in 1937.

== Species ==
- Mecistophylla agramma (Lower, 1903)
- Mecistophylla amechanica Turner, 1942
- Mecistophylla asthenitis (Turner, 1904)
- Mecistophylla disema (Lower, 1905)
- Mecistophylla ebenopasta (Turner, 1904)
- Mecistophylla psara Turner, 1937
- Mecistophylla spodoptera (Lower, 1907)
- Mecistophylla stenopepla (Turner, 1904)
