= Mecistophylla disema =

Scientific classification
- Domain: Eukaryota
- Kingdom: Animalia
- Phylum: Arthropoda
- Class: Insecta
- Order: Lepidoptera
- Family: Pyralidae
- Genus: Mecistophylla
- Species: M. disema

Binomial name
- Mecistophylla disema (Lower, 1905)

Synonyms
- Melissoblaptes disema Lower, 1905

Species of moth

Mecistophylla disema is a species of snout moth in the genus Mecistophylla. It was described by Oswald Bertram Lower in 1905 and is known from Australia, including Victoria.
