= Lamoria pachylepidella =

Scientific classification
- Domain: Eukaryota
- Kingdom: Animalia
- Phylum: Arthropoda
- Class: Insecta
- Order: Lepidoptera
- Family: Pyralidae
- Genus: Lamoria
- Species: L. pachylepidella

Binomial name
- Lamoria pachylepidella Ragonot, 1901

Species of moth

Lamoria pachylepidella is a species of snout moth in the genus Lamoria. It was described by Ragonot in 1901. It is found in Australia, including Queensland.
