= Mecistophylla agramma =

Scientific classification
- Domain: Eukaryota
- Kingdom: Animalia
- Phylum: Arthropoda
- Class: Insecta
- Order: Lepidoptera
- Family: Pyralidae
- Genus: Mecistophylla
- Species: M. agramma

Binomial name
- Mecistophylla agramma (Lower, 1903)

Synonyms
- Melissoblaptes agramma Lower, 1903

Species of moth

Mecistophylla agramma is a species of snout moth in the genus Mecistophylla. It was described by Oswald Bertram Lower in 1903 and is known from the Australian state of Queensland and the Louisiade Archipelago.
