= Lamoria hemi =

Scientific classification
- Domain: Eukaryota
- Kingdom: Animalia
- Phylum: Arthropoda
- Class: Insecta
- Order: Lepidoptera
- Family: Pyralidae
- Genus: Lamoria
- Species: L. hemi

Binomial name
- Lamoria hemi Rose, 1981

Species of moth

Lamoria hemi is a species of snout moth in the genus Lamoria. It was described by Rose in 1981. It is found in India.
