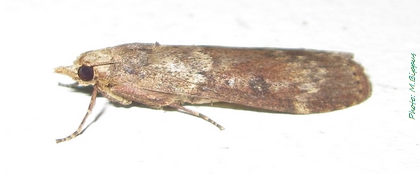

Scientific classification
- Domain: Eukaryota
- Kingdom: Animalia
- Phylum: Arthropoda
- Class: Insecta
- Order: Lepidoptera
- Family: Pyralidae
- Genus: Lamoria
- Species: L. clathrella

Binomial name
- Lamoria clathrella (Ragonot, 1888)

Synonyms
- Tugela clathrella Ragonot, 1888

= Lamoria clathrella =

Species of moth

Lamoria clathrella is a species of snout moth in the genus Lamoria. It was described by Ragonot in 1888, and is known from Madagascar, La Réunion and Mauritius.

The larvae feed on Eugenia jambolana.
