= Heteromicta poeodes =

Scientific classification
- Domain: Eukaryota
- Kingdom: Animalia
- Phylum: Arthropoda
- Class: Insecta
- Order: Lepidoptera
- Family: Pyralidae
- Genus: Heteromicta
- Species: H. poeodes

Binomial name
- Heteromicta poeodes Turner, 1905

Species of moth

Heteromicta poeodes is a species of snout moth in the genus Heteromicta. It was described by Alfred Jefferis Turner in 1905. It is found in Australia (including Queensland).
