= Neophrida porphyrea =

Scientific classification
- Kingdom: Animalia
- Phylum: Arthropoda
- Class: Insecta
- Order: Lepidoptera
- Family: Pyralidae
- Genus: Neophrida
- Species: N. porphyrea

Binomial name
- Neophrida porphyrea Whalley, 1964

Species of moth

Neophrida porphyrea is a species of snout moth in the genus Neophrida. It was described by Whalley in 1964, and is known from French Guiana.
