= Alpheias gitonalis =

Scientific classification
- Kingdom: Animalia
- Phylum: Arthropoda
- Class: Insecta
- Order: Lepidoptera
- Family: Pyralidae
- Genus: Alpheias
- Species: A. gitonalis

Binomial name
- Alpheias gitonalis Ragonot, 1891

Species of moth

Alpheias gitonalis is a species of snout moth in the genus Alpheias. It was described by Ragonot, in 1891, and is known from Mexico.
