= Microchlora bilineella =

Scientific classification
- Kingdom: Animalia
- Phylum: Arthropoda
- Class: Insecta
- Order: Lepidoptera
- Family: Pyralidae
- Genus: Microchlora
- Species: M. bilineella

Binomial name
- Microchlora bilineella Hampson, 1917

Species of moth

Microchlora bilineella is a species of snout moth in the genus Microchlora. It was described by George Hampson in 1917 and is known from Papua New Guinea.
