= Lamoria oenochroa =

Scientific classification
- Domain: Eukaryota
- Kingdom: Animalia
- Phylum: Arthropoda
- Class: Insecta
- Order: Lepidoptera
- Family: Pyralidae
- Genus: Lamoria
- Species: L. oenochroa

Binomial name
- Lamoria oenochroa Turner, 1905

Species of moth

Lamoria oenochroa is a species of snout moth in the genus Lamoria. It was described by Turner in 1905. It is found in Australia, including Queensland.
