= Ethopia roseilinea =

Scientific classification
- Kingdom: Animalia
- Phylum: Arthropoda
- Class: Insecta
- Order: Lepidoptera
- Family: Pyralidae
- Genus: Ethopia
- Species: E. roseilinea

Binomial name
- Ethopia roseilinea Walker, 1865

Synonyms
- Crambomorpha aurora Vollenhoven, 1872; Protolithosia roseivenata Röber, 1925

Species of moth

Ethopia roseilinea is a species of snout moth in the genus Ethopia. It was described by Francis Walker in 1865 and is known from New Guinea, the Philippines, Sri Lanka and the D'Entrecasteaux Islands.
