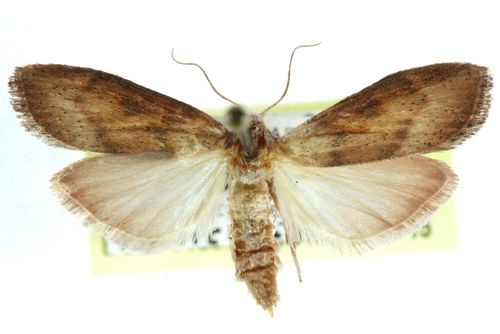

Scientific classification
- Kingdom: Animalia
- Phylum: Arthropoda
- Class: Insecta
- Order: Lepidoptera
- Family: Pyralidae
- Genus: Epimorius
- Species: E. testaceellus

Binomial name
- Epimorius testaceellus Ragonot, 1887

= Epimorius testaceellus =

Species of moth

Epimorius testaceellus is a species of snout moth in the genus Epimorius. It was described by Ragonot in 1887, and is known from Jamaica.
