= Mecistophylla asthenitis =

Scientific classification
- Domain: Eukaryota
- Kingdom: Animalia
- Phylum: Arthropoda
- Class: Insecta
- Order: Lepidoptera
- Family: Pyralidae
- Genus: Mecistophylla
- Species: M. asthenitis

Binomial name
- Mecistophylla asthenitis (Turner, 1904)

Synonyms
- Corcyra asthenitis Turner, 1904

Species of moth

Mecistophylla asthenitis is a species of Snout Moth in the genus Mecistophylla. It was described by Turner in 1904, and is known from Queensland, Australia.^{α}

== Notes ==
α. The header on the published version of Turner's manuscript misspells his middle name as "Fefferis" instead of "Jefferis".
