= Stenachroia =

Scientific classification
- Kingdom: Animalia
- Phylum: Arthropoda
- Clade: Pancrustacea
- Class: Insecta
- Order: Lepidoptera
- Family: Pyralidae
- Subfamily: Galleriinae
- Tribe: Tirathabini
- Genus: Stenachroia; Hampson, 1898
- Species: S. elongella

Binomial name
- Stenachroia elongella Hampson, 1898

Genus of moths

Stenachroia elongella, the sorghum earhead worm or cob borer, is a moth of the family Pyralidae. It is the only species in the genus Stenachroia. The species was first described by George Hampson in 1898. It is found in India and Sri Lanka.

During 1977 and 1978, the species was recorded as a major pest of maize cobs, damaging mature grains, in the Khasi Hills in Meghalaya, India.
