= Lamoria pallens =

Scientific classification
- Domain: Eukaryota
- Kingdom: Animalia
- Phylum: Arthropoda
- Class: Insecta
- Order: Lepidoptera
- Family: Pyralidae
- Genus: Lamoria
- Species: L. pallens

Binomial name
- Lamoria pallens Whalley, 1964

Species of moth

Lamoria pallens is a species of snout moth. It is found in South Africa.
