= Heteromicta tripartitella =

Scientific classification
- Kingdom: Animalia
- Phylum: Arthropoda
- Class: Insecta
- Order: Lepidoptera
- Family: Pyralidae
- Genus: Heteromicta
- Species: H. tripartitella

Binomial name
- Heteromicta tripartitella (Meyrick, 1879)

Synonyms
- Aphomia tripartitella Meyrick, 1879; Heteromicta leptochlora Turner, 1913

Species of moth

Heteromicta tripartitella is a species of snout moth in the genus Heteromicta. It was described by Edward Meyrick in 1879. It is found in Australia (including Queensland and New South Wales).
