= Heteromicta alypeta =

Scientific classification
- Domain: Eukaryota
- Kingdom: Animalia
- Phylum: Arthropoda
- Class: Insecta
- Order: Lepidoptera
- Family: Pyralidae
- Genus: Heteromicta
- Species: H. alypeta

Binomial name
- Heteromicta alypeta Turner, 1911

Species of moth

Heteromicta alypeta is a species of snout moth in the genus Heteromicta. It was described by Turner in 1911, and is known from Queensland, Australia.
