= Epimorius maylinae =

Scientific classification
- Kingdom: Animalia
- Phylum: Arthropoda
- Clade: Pancrustacea
- Class: Insecta
- Order: Lepidoptera
- Family: Pyralidae
- Genus: Epimorius
- Species: E. maylinae

Binomial name
- Epimorius maylinae Solis, 2003

Species of moth

Epimorius maylinae is a species of snout moth in the genus Epimorius. It was described by Solis in 2003, and is known from Costa Rica.
