= Lamoria idiolepida =

Scientific classification
- Domain: Eukaryota
- Kingdom: Animalia
- Phylum: Arthropoda
- Class: Insecta
- Order: Lepidoptera
- Family: Pyralidae
- Genus: Lamoria
- Species: L. idiolepida

Binomial name
- Lamoria idiolepida Turner, 1922

Species of moth

Lamoria idiolepida is a species of snout moth in the genus Lamoria. It was described by Turner in 1922. It is found in Australia, including Queensland.
