= Lamoria cafrella =

Scientific classification
- Domain: Eukaryota
- Kingdom: Animalia
- Phylum: Arthropoda
- Class: Insecta
- Order: Lepidoptera
- Family: Pyralidae
- Genus: Lamoria
- Species: L. cafrella

Binomial name
- Lamoria cafrella (Ragonot, 1888)

Synonyms
- Tugela caffrella Ragonot, 1888

Species of moth

Lamoria cafrella is a species of snout moth in the genus Lamoria. It was described by Ragonot in 1888, and is known from South Africa.
