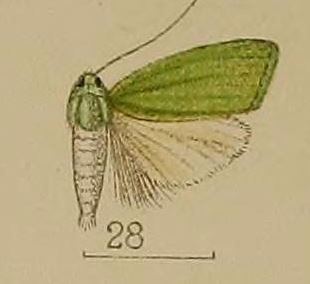

Scientific classification
- Kingdom: Animalia
- Phylum: Arthropoda
- Class: Insecta
- Order: Lepidoptera
- Family: Pyralidae
- Genus: Prasinoxena
- Species: P. metaleuca

Binomial name
- Prasinoxena metaleuca Hampson, 1912

= Prasinoxena metaleuca =

Species of moth

Prasinoxena metaleuca is a moth of the family Pyralidae first described by George Hampson in 1912. It is found in Thailand, western Malaysia and Sri Lanka.

The caterpillars are known to feed on Acacia mangium, Lansium domesticum and other Lansium species.
