= Lamoria melanophlebia =

Scientific classification
- Domain: Eukaryota
- Kingdom: Animalia
- Phylum: Arthropoda
- Class: Insecta
- Order: Lepidoptera
- Family: Pyralidae
- Genus: Lamoria
- Species: L. melanophlebia

Binomial name
- Lamoria melanophlebia Ragonot, 1888

Species of moth

Lamoria melanophlebia is a species of snout moth. It is found on Cyprus and the Caucasus.
