= Ertzica =

Scientific classification
- Kingdom: Animalia
- Phylum: Arthropoda
- Class: Insecta
- Order: Lepidoptera
- Family: Pyralidae
- Tribe: Tirathabini
- Genus: Ertzica; Walker, 1866

Synonyms
- Acara Walker, 1863

Genus of moths

Ertzica is a genus of snout moths. It was described by Francis Walker in 1866.

== Species ==
- Ertzica morosella (Walker, 1863)
- Ertzica dohrni (E. Hering, 1903)
