= Mecistophylla spodoptera =

Scientific classification
- Domain: Eukaryota
- Kingdom: Animalia
- Phylum: Arthropoda
- Class: Insecta
- Order: Lepidoptera
- Family: Pyralidae
- Genus: Mecistophylla
- Species: M. spodoptera

Binomial name
- Mecistophylla spodoptera (Lower, 1907)

Synonyms
- Melissoblaptes spodoptera Lower, 1907

Species of moth

Mecistophylla spodoptera is a species of snout moth in the genus Mecistophylla. It was described by Oswald Bertram Lower in 1907 and is known from Queensland, Australia.
