= Mecistophylla psara =

Scientific classification
- Domain: Eukaryota
- Kingdom: Animalia
- Phylum: Arthropoda
- Class: Insecta
- Order: Lepidoptera
- Family: Pyralidae
- Genus: Mecistophylla
- Species: M. psara

Binomial name
- Mecistophylla psara Turner, 1937

Species of moth

Mecistophylla psara is a species of snout moth in the genus Mecistophylla. It was described by Turner in 1937, and is known from Queensland, Australia.
