= Lamoria infumatella =

Scientific classification
- Kingdom: Animalia
- Phylum: Arthropoda
- Class: Insecta
- Order: Lepidoptera
- Family: Pyralidae
- Genus: Lamoria
- Species: L. infumatella

Binomial name
- Lamoria infumatella Hampson, 1898

Species of moth

Lamoria infumatella is a species of snout moth in the genus Lamoria. It is found in India and Sri Lanka.
