= Heteromicta aegidia =

Scientific classification
- Kingdom: Animalia
- Phylum: Arthropoda
- Class: Insecta
- Order: Lepidoptera
- Family: Pyralidae
- Genus: Heteromicta
- Species: H. aegidia

Binomial name
- Heteromicta aegidia (Meyrick, 1887)

Synonyms
- Melissoblaptes aegidia Meyrick, 1887

Species of moth

Heteromicta aegidia is a species of snout moth in the genus Heteromicta. It was described by Edward Meyrick in 1887 and is known from Australia.
