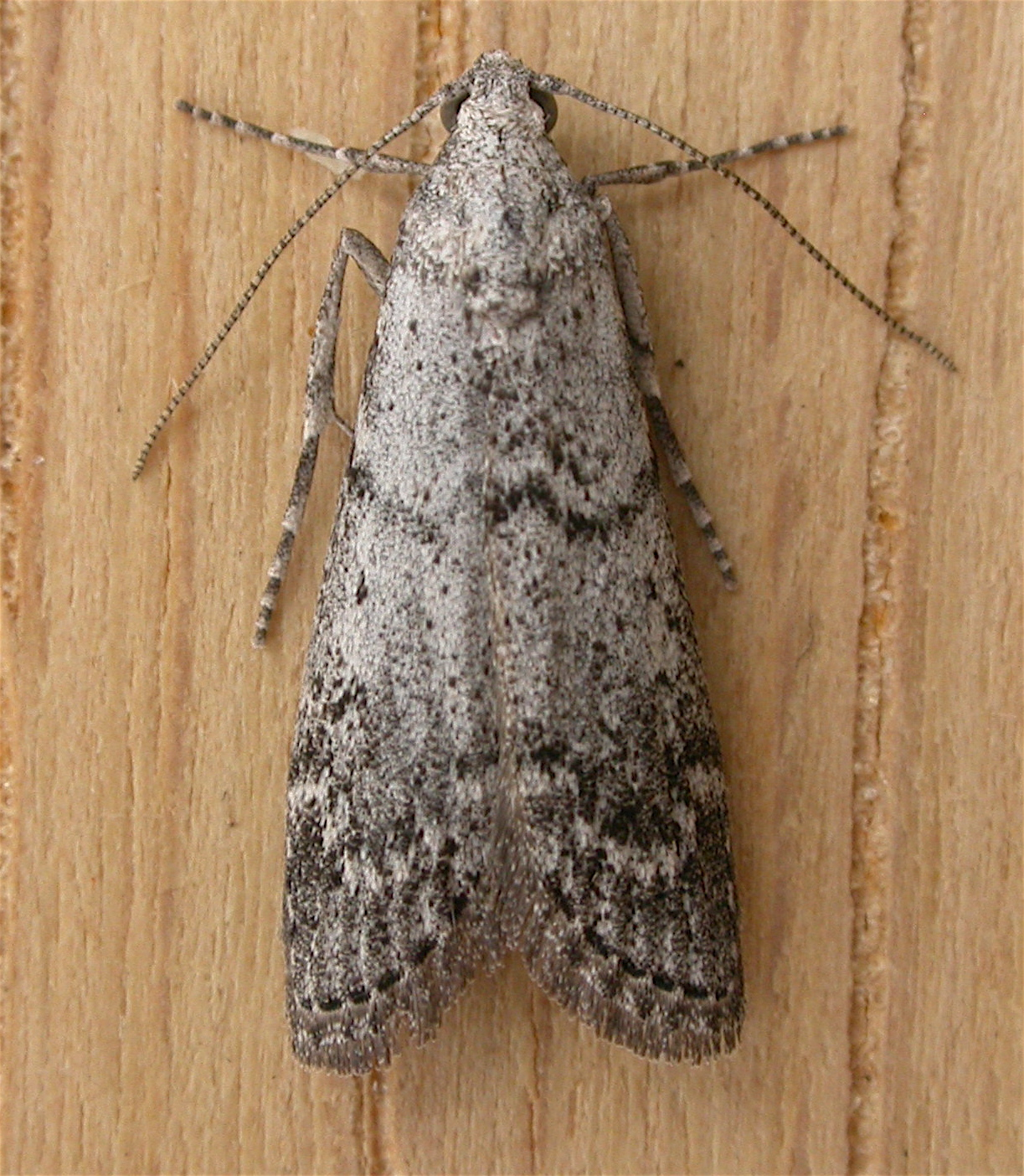
- Heteromicta pachytera

Scientific classification
- Kingdom: Animalia
- Phylum: Arthropoda
- Class: Insecta
- Order: Lepidoptera
- Family: Pyralidae
- Subfamily: Galleriinae
- Tribe: Tirathabini
- Genus: Heteromicta; Meyrick, 1886

= Heteromicta =

Genus of moths

Heteromicta is a genus of snout moths. It was described by Edward Meyrick in 1886.

== Species ==
- Heteromicta aegidia (Meyrick, 1887)
- Heteromicta alypeta Turner, 1911
- Heteromicta leucospila (Lower, 1907)
- Heteromicta melanomochla (Hampson, 1917)
- Heteromicta myrmecophila (Turner, 1905)
- Heteromicta nigricostella Ragonot, 1901
- Heteromicta ochraceella Ragonot, 1901
- Heteromicta pachytera (Meyrick, 1879)
- Heteromicta phloeomima (Turner, 1911)
- Heteromicta poeodes Turner, 1905
- Heteromicta poliostola Turner, 1904
- Heteromicta sordidella (Walker, 1866)
- Heteromicta tripartitella (Meyrick, 1879
