= Lamoria virescens =

Scientific classification
- Kingdom: Animalia
- Phylum: Arthropoda
- Class: Insecta
- Order: Lepidoptera
- Family: Pyralidae
- Genus: Lamoria
- Species: L. virescens

Binomial name
- Lamoria virescens Hampson, 1898

Species of moth

Lamoria virescens is a species of snout moth in the genus Lamoria. It was described by George Hampson in 1898. It is found in India and Sri Lanka.
