= Heteromicta ochraceella =

Scientific classification
- Domain: Eukaryota
- Kingdom: Animalia
- Phylum: Arthropoda
- Class: Insecta
- Order: Lepidoptera
- Family: Pyralidae
- Genus: Heteromicta
- Species: H. ochraceella

Binomial name
- Heteromicta ochraceella Ragonot, 1901

Species of moth

Heteromicta ochraceella is a species of snout moth in the genus Heteromicta. It was described by Émile Louis Ragonot in 1901. It is found in Australia (including Queensland).
