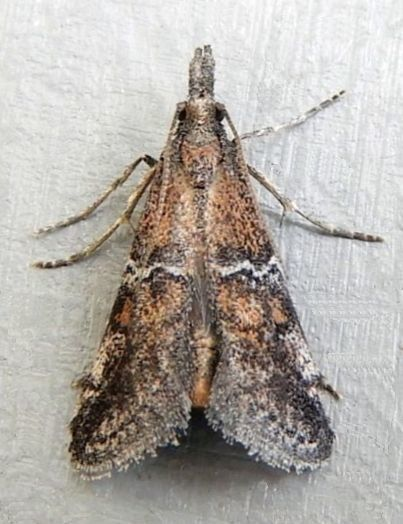

Scientific classification
- Kingdom: Animalia
- Phylum: Arthropoda
- Class: Insecta
- Order: Lepidoptera
- Family: Pyralidae
- Genus: Alpheias
- Species: A. vicarilis

Binomial name
- Alpheias vicarilis Dyar, 1913

= Alpheias vicarilis =

Species of moth

Alpheias vicarilis is a species of snout moth in the genus Alpheias. It was described by Harrison Gray Dyar Jr. in 1913, and is known from the US state of California.
