= Lamoria imbella =

Scientific classification
- Kingdom: Animalia
- Phylum: Arthropoda
- Class: Insecta
- Order: Lepidoptera
- Family: Pyralidae
- Genus: Lamoria
- Species: L. imbella

Binomial name
- Lamoria imbella (Walker, 1864)

Synonyms
- Acrobasis imbella Walker, 1864; Melissoblaptes obscurellus Saalmüller, 1880

Species of moth

Lamoria imbella is a species of snout moth. It is found in Kenya, Madagascar, Malawi, Nigeria, South Africa and Zimbabwe.
