= Cataprosopus chapalis =

Scientific classification
- Kingdom: Animalia
- Phylum: Arthropoda
- Class: Insecta
- Order: Lepidoptera
- Family: Pyralidae
- Genus: Cataprosopus
- Species: C. chapalis

Binomial name
- Cataprosopus chapalis (de Joannis, 1929)

Synonyms
- Omphalobasis chapalis de Joannis, 1929

Species of moth

Cataprosopus chapalis is a species of snout moth in the genus Cataprosopus. It was described by Joseph de Joannis in 1929 and is known from China.
