= Prasinoxena bilineella =

Scientific classification
- Kingdom: Animalia
- Phylum: Arthropoda
- Class: Insecta
- Order: Lepidoptera
- Family: Pyralidae
- Genus: Prasinoxena
- Species: P. bilineella

Binomial name
- Prasinoxena bilineella Hampson, 1901

Species of moth

Prasinoxena bilineella is a species of moth in the family Pyralidae. It was described by George Hampson in 1901.
