= Heteromicta myrmecophila =

Scientific classification
- Domain: Eukaryota
- Kingdom: Animalia
- Phylum: Arthropoda
- Class: Insecta
- Order: Lepidoptera
- Family: Pyralidae
- Genus: Heteromicta
- Species: H. myrmecophila

Binomial name
- Heteromicta myrmecophila (Turner, 1905)

Synonyms
- Stenachroia myrmecophila Turner, 1905; Achroia myrmecophila; Meliphora myrmecophila Turner, 1913

Species of moth

Heteromicta myrmecophila is a species of snout moth in the genus Heteromicta. It was described by Alfred Jefferis Turner in 1913. It is found in Australia.
