= Lamoria adaptella =

Scientific classification
- Kingdom: Animalia
- Phylum: Arthropoda
- Class: Insecta
- Order: Lepidoptera
- Family: Pyralidae
- Genus: Lamoria
- Species: L. adaptella

Binomial name
- Lamoria adaptella (Walker, 1863)

Synonyms
- Pempelia adaptella Walker, 1863; Lamoria anella Hampson, 1896 (Preocc.); Crambus foedellus Walker, 1866; Lamoria bipunctanus Moore, 1886; Lamoria fusconervella Ragonot, 1888; Lamoria planalis Walker, 1863

Species of moth

Lamoria adaptella, the plain lamoria, is a species of snout moth (family Pyralidae) in the genus Lamoria. It was described by Francis Walker in 1863 and is known from South Africa, the Gambia, Kenya, Mozambique, India, Sri Lanka, Indonesia and Singapore, as well as Japan and Taiwan.

== Description ==
Its wingspan is about 24–34 mm. It is a pale brown moth. The forewings are irrorated (sprinkled) with fuscous. There are traces of an irregularly dentate antemedial dark line. A speck, spot or small annulus in cell and larger discocellular spot or annulus. A highly dentate, postmedial, more or less prominent line oblique from costa to vein 4, where it is sharply angled, then inwardly oblique. A marginal black specks series present. Hindwings pale brownish.

Larva known to feed on plants like Dipterocarpus, Pennisetum americanum and Shorea species.
