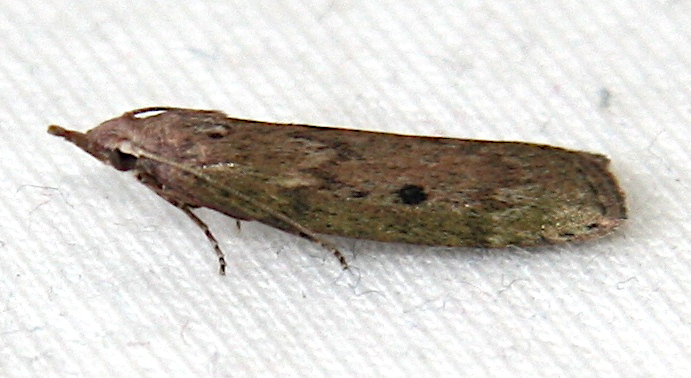
- Paralipsa gularis

Scientific classification
- Kingdom: Animalia
- Phylum: Arthropoda
- Clade: Pancrustacea
- Class: Insecta
- Order: Lepidoptera
- Family: Pyralidae
- Subfamily: Galleriinae
- Tribe: Tirathabini
- Genus: Paralipsa; Butler, 1879

Synonyms
- Paralispa Spuler, 1910

= Paralipsa =

Genus of moths

Paralipsa is a genus of snout moths described by Arthur Gardiner Butler in 1879.

== Species ==
- Paralipsa decolorella Ragonot, 1901
- Paralipsa exacta Whalley, 1962
- Paralipsa erubella Hampson, 1901
- Paralipsa gularis (Zeller, 1877)
