= Microchlora =

Scientific classification
- Kingdom: Animalia
- Phylum: Arthropoda
- Class: Insecta
- Order: Lepidoptera
- Family: Pyralidae
- Tribe: Tirathabini
- Genus: Microchlora; Hampson in Ragonot, 1901

Genus of moths

Microchlora is a genus of snout moths. It was described by George Hampson in 1901.

== Species ==
- Microchlora bilineella Hampson, 1917
- Microchlora eariasella Hampson in Ragonot, 1901
