= Heteromicta poliostola =

Scientific classification
- Domain: Eukaryota
- Kingdom: Animalia
- Phylum: Arthropoda
- Class: Insecta
- Order: Lepidoptera
- Family: Pyralidae
- Genus: Heteromicta
- Species: H. poliostola

Binomial name
- Heteromicta poliostola Turner, 1904

Species of moth

Heteromicta poliostola is a species of snout moth in the genus Heteromicta. It was described by Alfred Jefferis Turner in 1904. It is found in Australia (including Queensland).
