= Prasinoxena viridissima =

Scientific classification
- Kingdom: Animalia
- Phylum: Arthropoda
- Class: Insecta
- Order: Lepidoptera
- Family: Pyralidae
- Genus: Prasinoxena
- Species: P. viridissima

Binomial name
- Prasinoxena viridissima C. Swinhoe, 1903

Species of moth

Prasinoxena viridissima is a species of moth in the family Pyralidae first described by Charles Swinhoe in 1903. It was found in Selangor, Malaysia.
