= Cataprosopus monstrosus =

Scientific classification
- Kingdom: Animalia
- Phylum: Arthropoda
- Class: Insecta
- Order: Lepidoptera
- Family: Pyralidae
- Genus: Cataprosopus
- Species: C. monstrosus

Binomial name
- Cataprosopus monstrosus Butler, 1881

Species of moth

Cataprosopus monstrosus is a species of snout moth in the genus Cataprosopus. It was described by Arthur Gardiner Butler in 1881 and is known from Japan, China and Korea.

The wingspan is 30–38 mm.
