= Acyperas aurantiacella =

Scientific classification
- Kingdom: Animalia
- Phylum: Arthropoda
- Clade: Pancrustacea
- Class: Insecta
- Order: Lepidoptera
- Family: Pyralidae
- Genus: Acyperas
- Species: A. aurantiacella

Binomial name
- Acyperas aurantiacella Hampson in Ragonot, 1901

Species of moth

Acyperas aurantiacella is a species of snout moth in the genus Acyperas. It was described by George Hampson in 1901 and is known from Papua New Guinea and the D'Entrecasteaux Islands.
