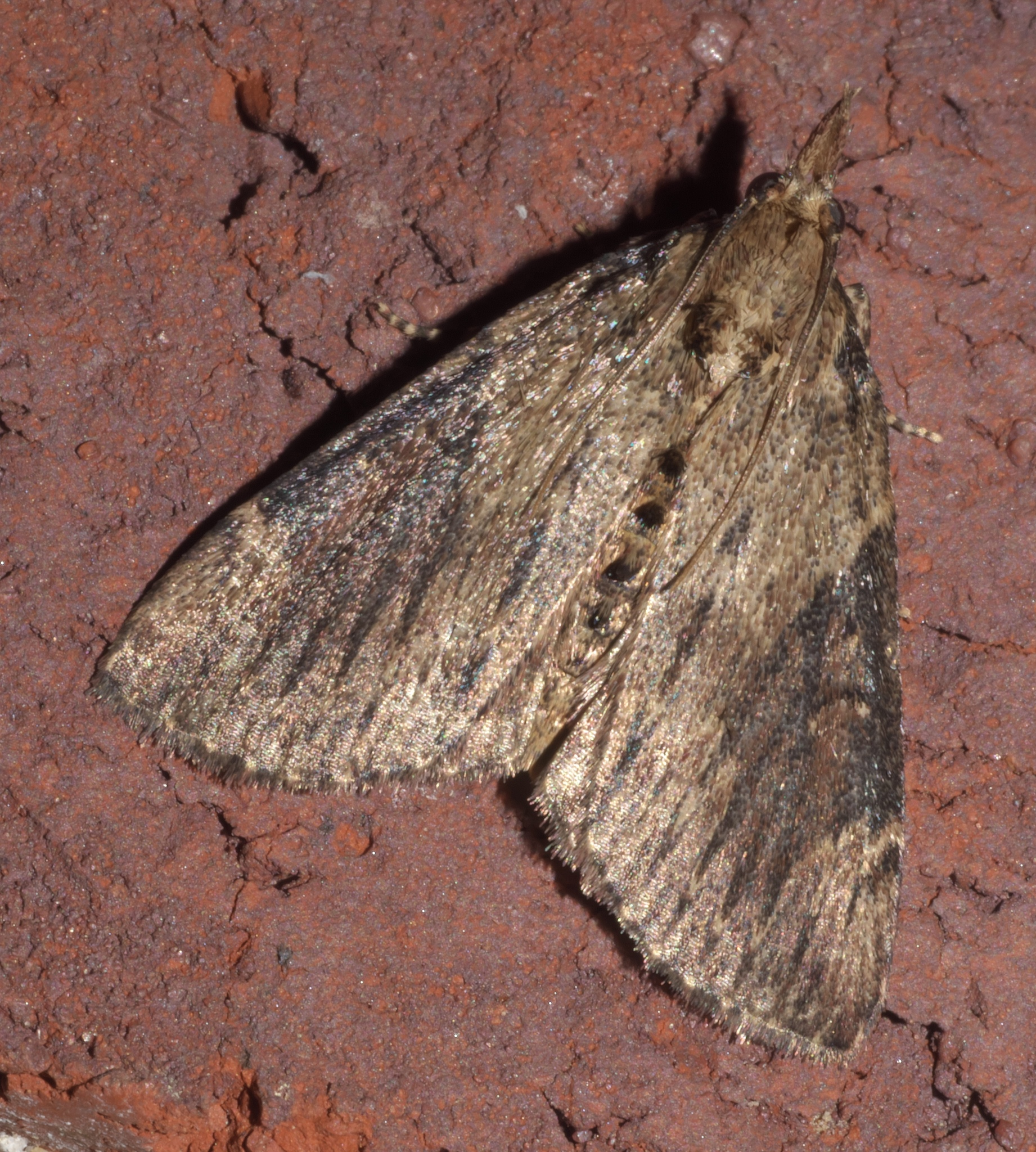
- Omphalocera cariosa, Oklahoma

Scientific classification
- Domain: Eukaryota
- Kingdom: Animalia
- Phylum: Arthropoda
- Class: Insecta
- Order: Lepidoptera
- Family: Pyralidae
- Tribe: Megarthridiini
- Genus: Omphalocera
- Species: O. cariosa

Binomial name
- Omphalocera cariosa Lederer, 1863

Synonyms
- Omphalocera dentosa Grote, 1881

= Omphalocera cariosa =

Species of moth

Omphalocera cariosa is a species of snout moth, and the type species in the genus Omphalocera. It was described by Julius Lederer in 1863. It is found from North America (including Alabama, Florida, Georgia, Illinois, Indiana, Maryland, Mississippi, Ohio, Oklahoma, South Carolina, Tennessee, Texas and West Virginia) to Brazil.

Adults are on wing from May to August in North America.

The larvae have been recorded feeding on Menispermum canadense.
