= Heteromicta nigricostella =

Scientific classification
- Domain: Eukaryota
- Kingdom: Animalia
- Phylum: Arthropoda
- Class: Insecta
- Order: Lepidoptera
- Family: Pyralidae
- Genus: Heteromicta
- Species: H. nigricostella

Binomial name
- Heteromicta nigricostella Ragonot, 1901

Synonyms
- Tirathaba microsora Turner, 1924

Species of moth

Heteromicta nigricostella is a species of snout moth in the genus Heteromicta. It was described by Ragonot in 1901, and is known from Queensland, Australia.
