= Epimorius suffusus =

Scientific classification
- Kingdom: Animalia
- Phylum: Arthropoda
- Clade: Pancrustacea
- Class: Insecta
- Order: Lepidoptera
- Family: Pyralidae
- Genus: Epimorius
- Species: E. suffusus

Binomial name
- Epimorius suffusus (Zeller, 1877)

Synonyms
- Melissoblaptes (Epimorius) suffusus Zeller, 1877

Species of moth

Epimorius suffusus is a species of snout moth in the genus Epimorius. It was described by Philipp Christoph Zeller in 1877 and is known from Brazil and Costa Rica.
