= Lamoria medianalis =

Scientific classification
- Kingdom: Animalia
- Phylum: Arthropoda
- Class: Insecta
- Order: Lepidoptera
- Family: Pyralidae
- Genus: Lamoria
- Species: L. medianalis

Binomial name
- Lamoria medianalis Hampson, 1917

Species of moth

Lamoria medianalis is a species of snout moth. It is found in Zimbabwe.
