= Prasinoxena hemisema =

Scientific classification
- Kingdom: Animalia
- Phylum: Arthropoda
- Class: Insecta
- Order: Lepidoptera
- Family: Pyralidae
- Genus: Prasinoxena
- Species: P. hemisema

Binomial name
- Prasinoxena hemisema Meyrick, 1894

Species of moth

Prasinoxena hemisema is a species of moth in the family Pyralidae. It was described by Edward Meyrick in 1894. It was found on Sumbawa in Indonesia.
