= Alpheias baccalis =

Scientific classification
- Kingdom: Animalia
- Phylum: Arthropoda
- Clade: Pancrustacea
- Class: Insecta
- Order: Lepidoptera
- Family: Pyralidae
- Genus: Alpheias
- Species: A. baccalis

Binomial name
- Alpheias baccalis Ragonot, (1890)

Species of moth

Alpheias baccalis is a species of snout moth in the genus Alpheias. It was described by Ragonot, in 1890, and is known from Sonora, Mexico.
