= Heteromicta phloeomima =

Scientific classification
- Domain: Eukaryota
- Kingdom: Animalia
- Phylum: Arthropoda
- Class: Insecta
- Order: Lepidoptera
- Family: Pyralidae
- Genus: Heteromicta
- Species: H. phloeomima

Binomial name
- Heteromicta phloeomima (Turner, 1911)

Synonyms
- Hypolophota phloeomima Turner, 1911

Species of moth

Heteromicta phloeomima is a species of snout moth in the genus Heteromicta. It was described by Alfred Jefferis Turner in 1911. It is found in northern Australia.
