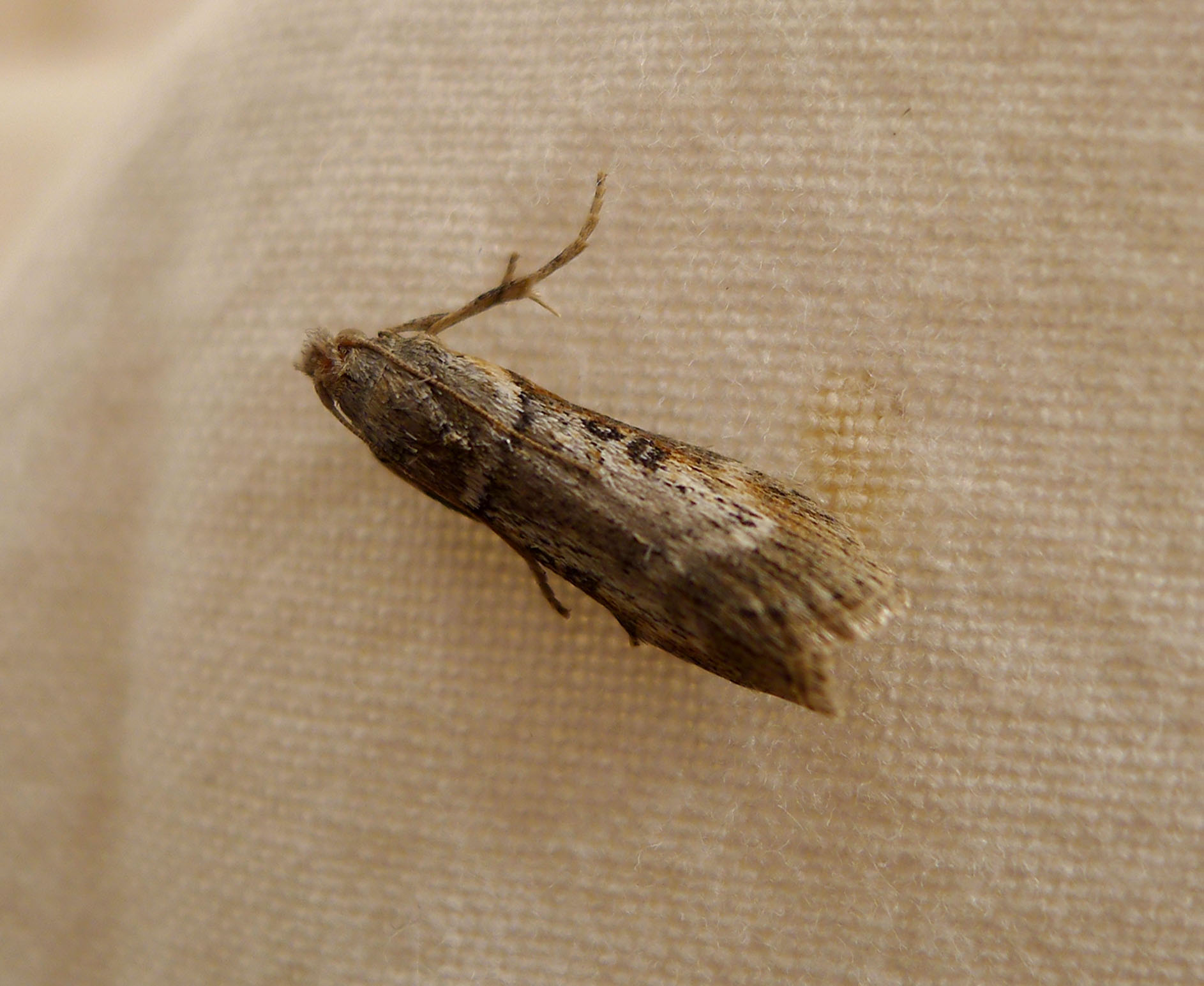

Scientific classification
- Kingdom: Animalia
- Phylum: Arthropoda
- Class: Insecta
- Order: Lepidoptera
- Family: Pyralidae
- Genus: Lamoria
- Species: L. anella

Binomial name
- Lamoria anella (Denis & Schiffermüller, 1775)

Synonyms
- List: Tinea anella Denis & Schiffermüller, 1775; Melia bipunctana Curtis, 1828; Lamoria anella var. insulana Schawerda, 1931; Lamoria anella var. marocana D. Lucas, 1955; Lamoria anella var. variegata D. Lucas, 1949

= Lamoria anella =

Species of moth

Lamoria anella is a species of snout moth described by Michael Denis and Ignaz Schiffermüller in 1775 found in Africa, Asia and Europe.

== Description ==
The wingspan measures 18–28 mm for males and 30–40 mm for females. The head, thorax, and abdomen are greyish brown. The forewings are grey-brown, often entirely suffused with red or fuscous. There is an indistinct, highly dentate antemedial line. A more or less developed speck is present in the cell and the discocellular spot. A highly dentate postmedial line is sharply angled on vein 4 and often reduced to streaks on the veins. A marginal specks series is present. The hindwings are pale semi-hyaline, suffused with fuscous towards the margin.

== Distribution ==
It is found in most of Europe (except Ireland, Great Britain, Fennoscandia, Denmark, the Baltic region and Slovenia), the Canary Islands, as well as North Africa (including Tunisia, Morocco and Egypt), South Africa, India, Afghanistan, Sri Lanka and the United Arab Emirates.

The first confirmed British record was recorded in a garden at Hartford, Huntingdonshire on 5 October 2018, possibly as a migrant.
