= Lamoria ruficostella =

Scientific classification
- Domain: Eukaryota
- Kingdom: Animalia
- Phylum: Arthropoda
- Class: Insecta
- Order: Lepidoptera
- Family: Pyralidae
- Genus: Lamoria
- Species: L. ruficostella

Binomial name
- Lamoria ruficostella Ragonot, 1888

Species of moth

Lamoria ruficostella is a species of snout moth. It is found on Crete and in Russia.
