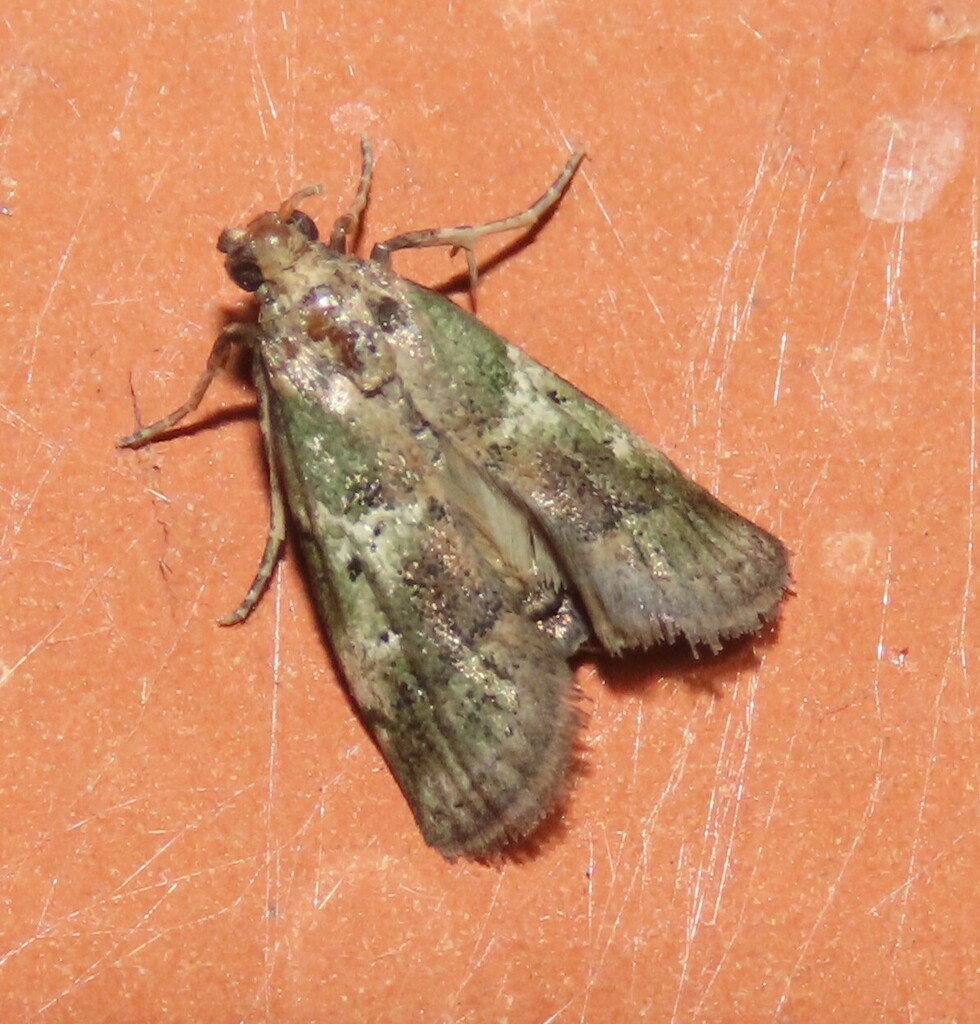

Scientific classification
- Kingdom: Animalia
- Phylum: Arthropoda
- Class: Insecta
- Order: Lepidoptera
- Family: Pyralidae
- Genus: Alpheias
- Species: A. querula

Binomial name
- Alpheias querula Dyar, 1913

= Alpheias querula =

Species of moth

Alpheias querula is a species of snout moth in the genus Alpheias. It was described by Harrison Gray Dyar Jr. in 1913, and is known from the US state of Texas.
