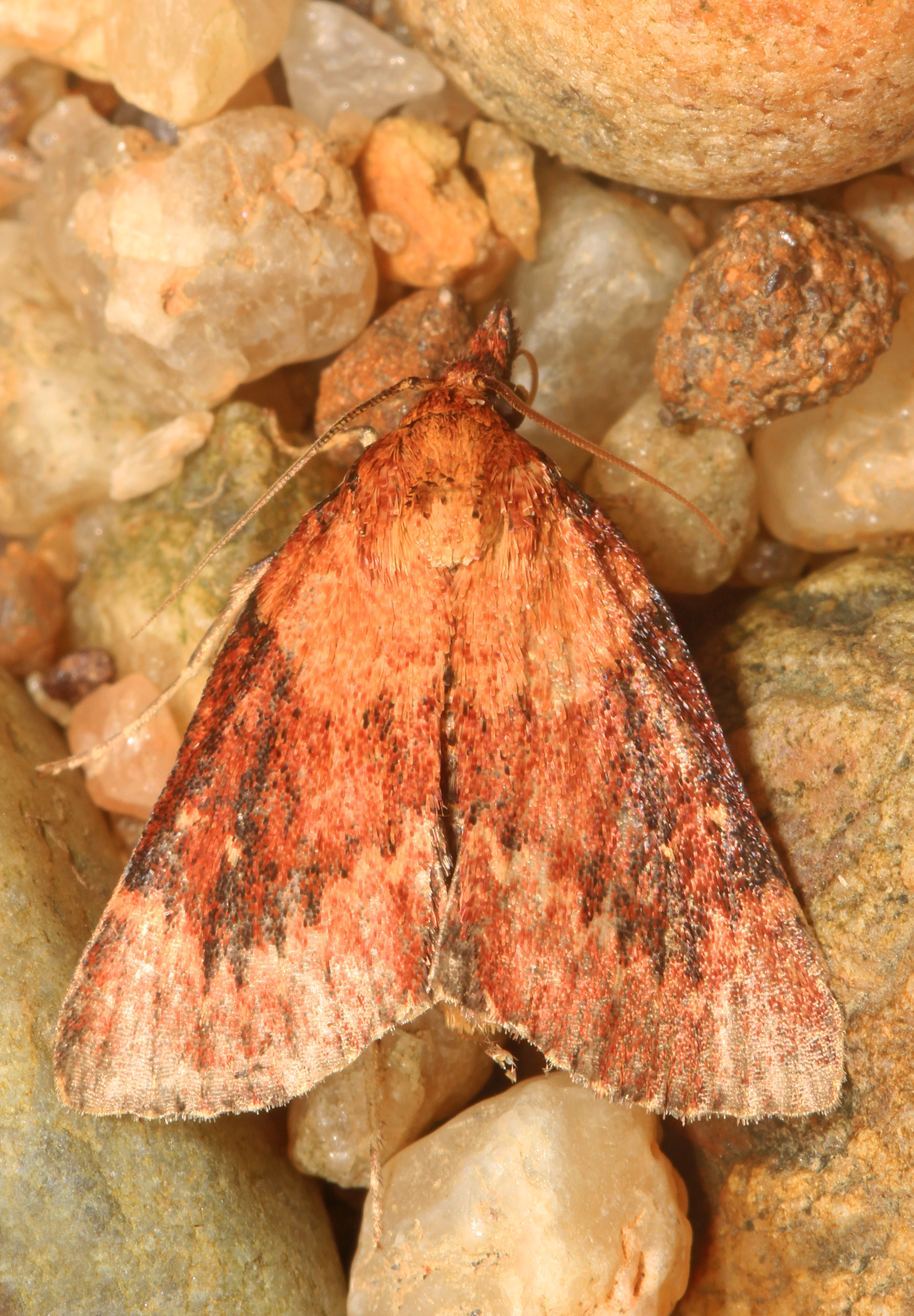

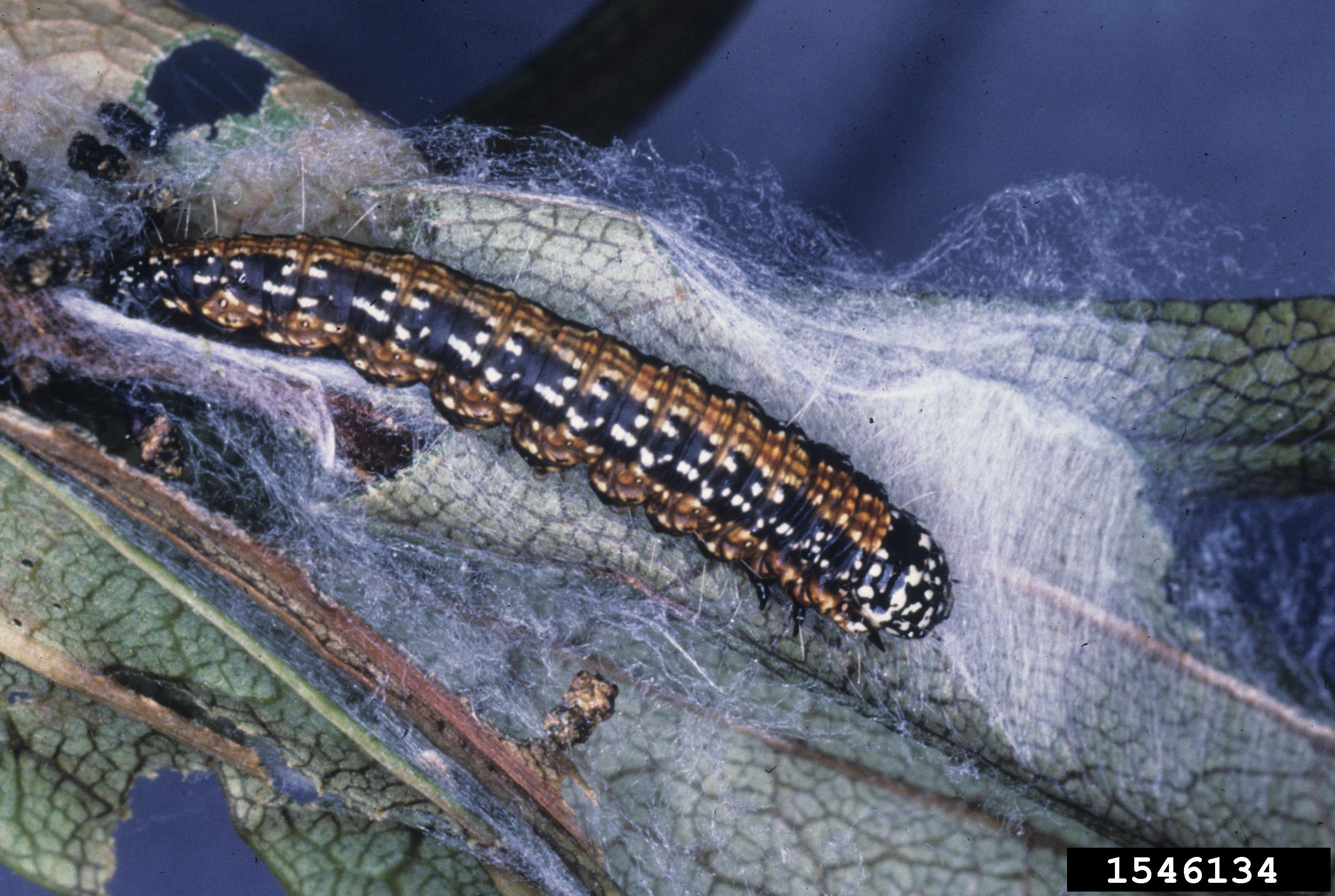
- Adult (top), and larva (bottom)

Scientific classification
- Domain: Eukaryota
- Kingdom: Animalia
- Phylum: Arthropoda
- Class: Insecta
- Order: Lepidoptera
- Family: Pyralidae
- Genus: Omphalocera
- Species: O. munroei

Binomial name
- Omphalocera munroei Martin, 1956

= Omphalocera munroei =

Species of moth

Omphalocera munroei, the Asimina webworm moth, is a moth of the family Pyralidae. It is found in the United States, including Florida, Indiana and West Virginia.

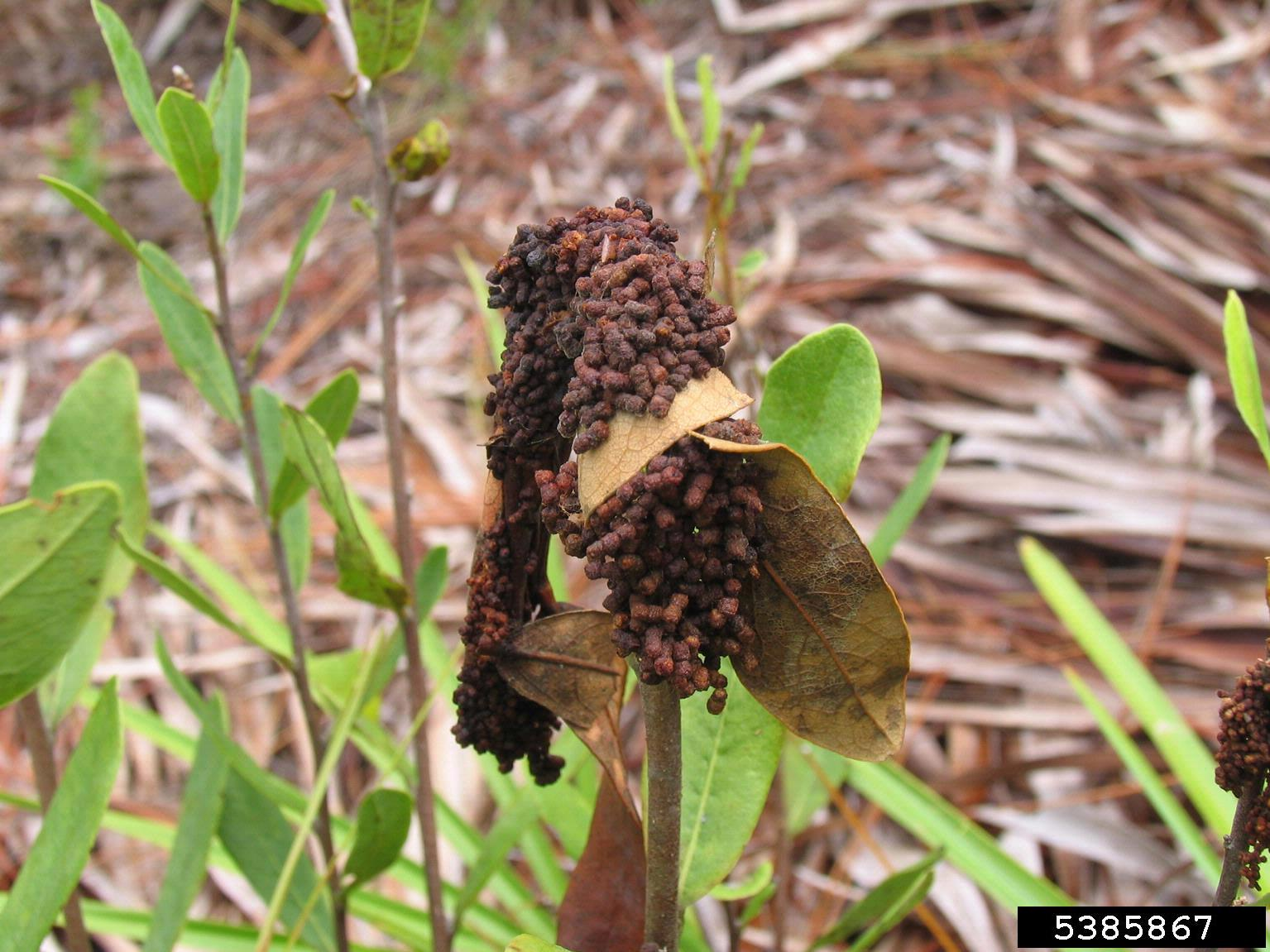

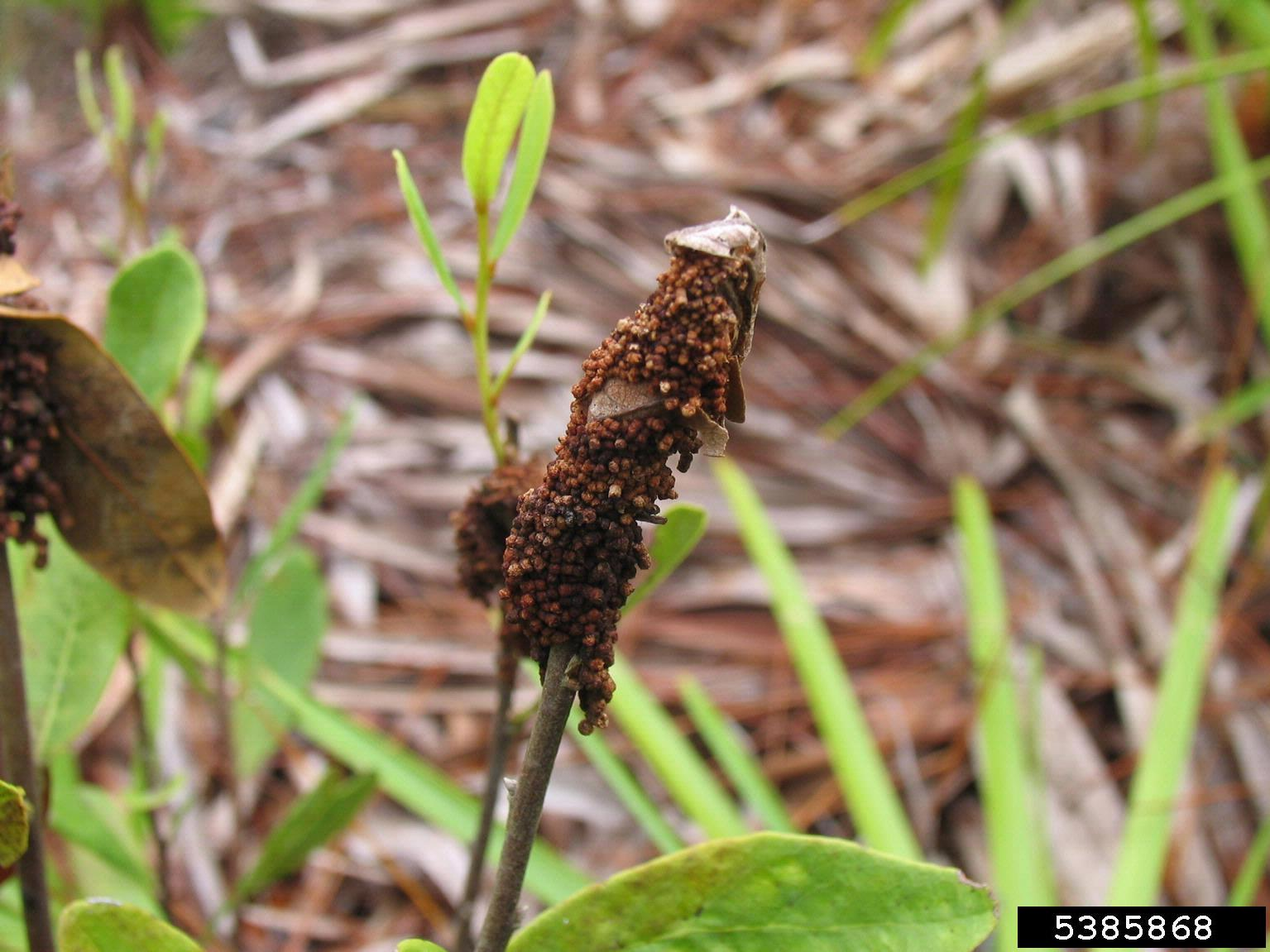

The larvae feed on the leaves, buds and twigs of Asimina species. The larvae create a leaf shelter from within they feed.
