= Ethopia =

Scientific classification
- Kingdom: Animalia
- Phylum: Arthropoda
- Class: Insecta
- Order: Lepidoptera
- Family: Pyralidae
- Tribe: Tirathabini
- Genus: Ethopia; Walker, 1865

Genus of moths

Ethopia is a genus of snout moths. It was described by Francis Walker in 1865.

== Species ==
- Ethopia gigantea Owada, 1986
- Ethopia polyisogramma Wu & Yang, 2007
- Ethopia roseilinea Walker, 1865
- Ethopia sapa Wu & Yang 2007
