= Hypolophota =

Scientific classification
- Kingdom: Animalia
- Phylum: Arthropoda
- Class: Insecta
- Order: Lepidoptera
- Family: Pyralidae
- Tribe: Tirathabini
- Genus: Hypolophota; Turner, 1904

Genus of moths

Hypolophota is a genus of snout moths. It was described by Alfred Jefferis Turner in 1904.

== Species ==
- Hypolophota amydrastis Turner, 1904
- Hypolophota oodes Turner, 1904
