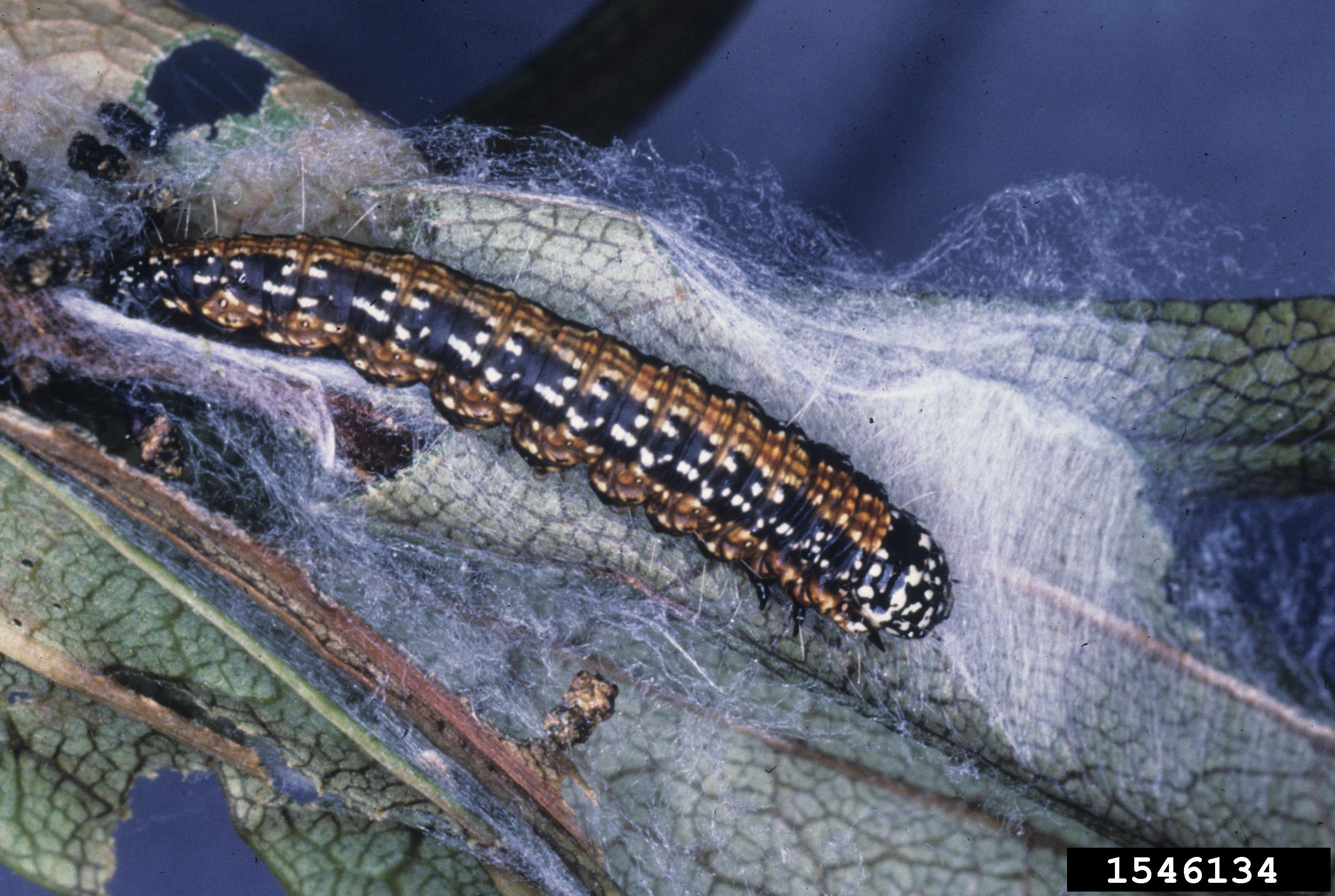
- Omphalocera munroei

Scientific classification
- Kingdom: Animalia
- Phylum: Arthropoda
- Class: Insecta
- Order: Lepidoptera
- Family: Pyralidae
- Tribe: Megarthridiini
- Genus: Omphalocera; Lederer, 1863

= Omphalocera =

Genus of moths

Omphalocera is a genus of snout moths. It was described by Julius Lederer in 1863.

== Species ==
- Omphalocera cariosa Lederer, 1863
- Omphalocera munroei E. L. Martin, 1956
- Omphalocera occidentalis Barnes & Benjamin, 1924
