= Marisba =

Scientific classification
- Kingdom: Animalia
- Phylum: Arthropoda
- Clade: Pancrustacea
- Class: Insecta
- Order: Lepidoptera
- Family: Pyralidae
- Genus: Marisba; Walker, 1863
- Species: M. undulifera

Binomial name
- Marisba undulifera Walker, 1863

Genus of moths

Marisba is a monotypic snout moth genus. Its one species, Marisba undulifera, was described by Francis Walker in 1863, and is known from Brazil (including Rio de Janeiro, the type location).
