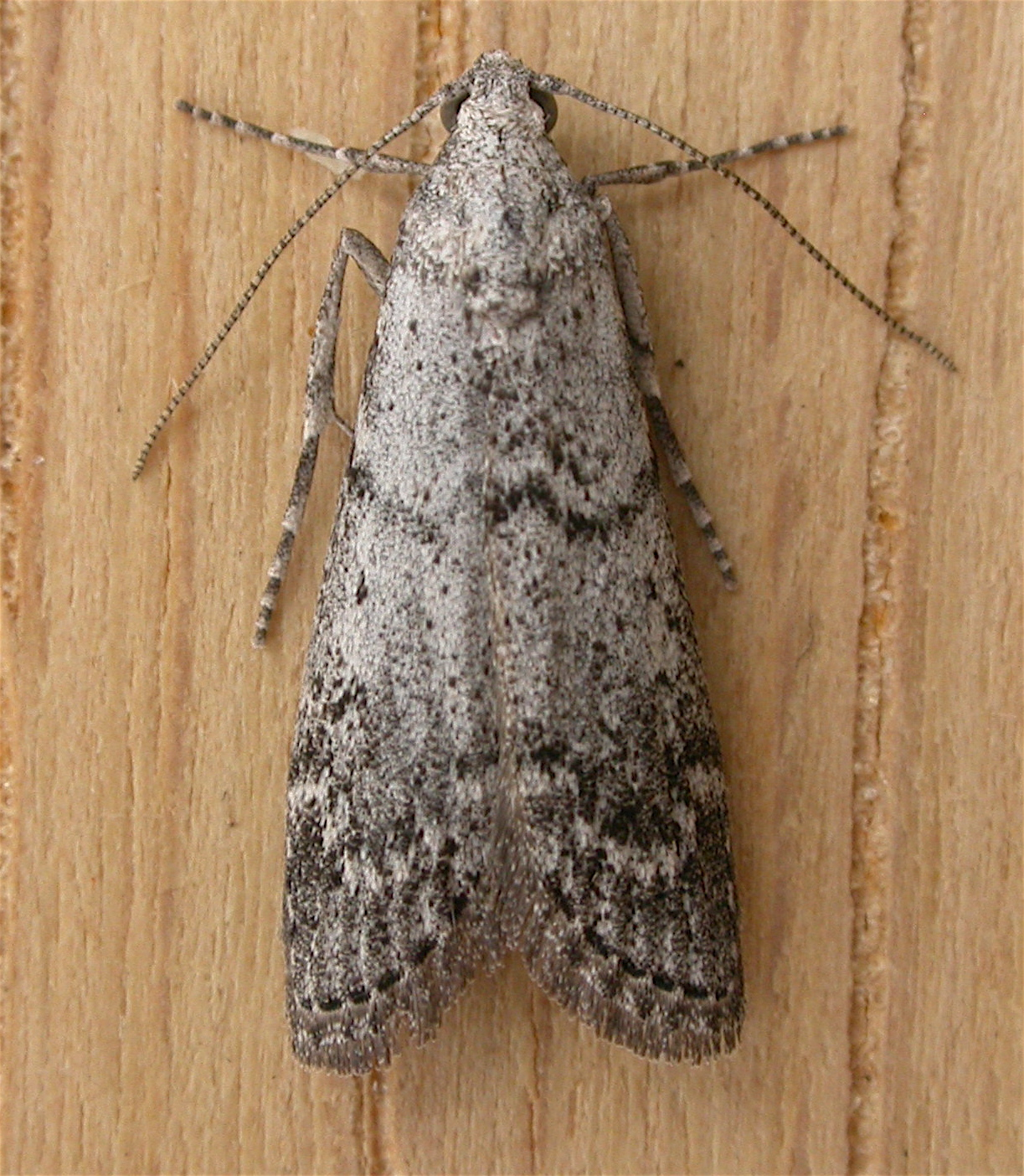

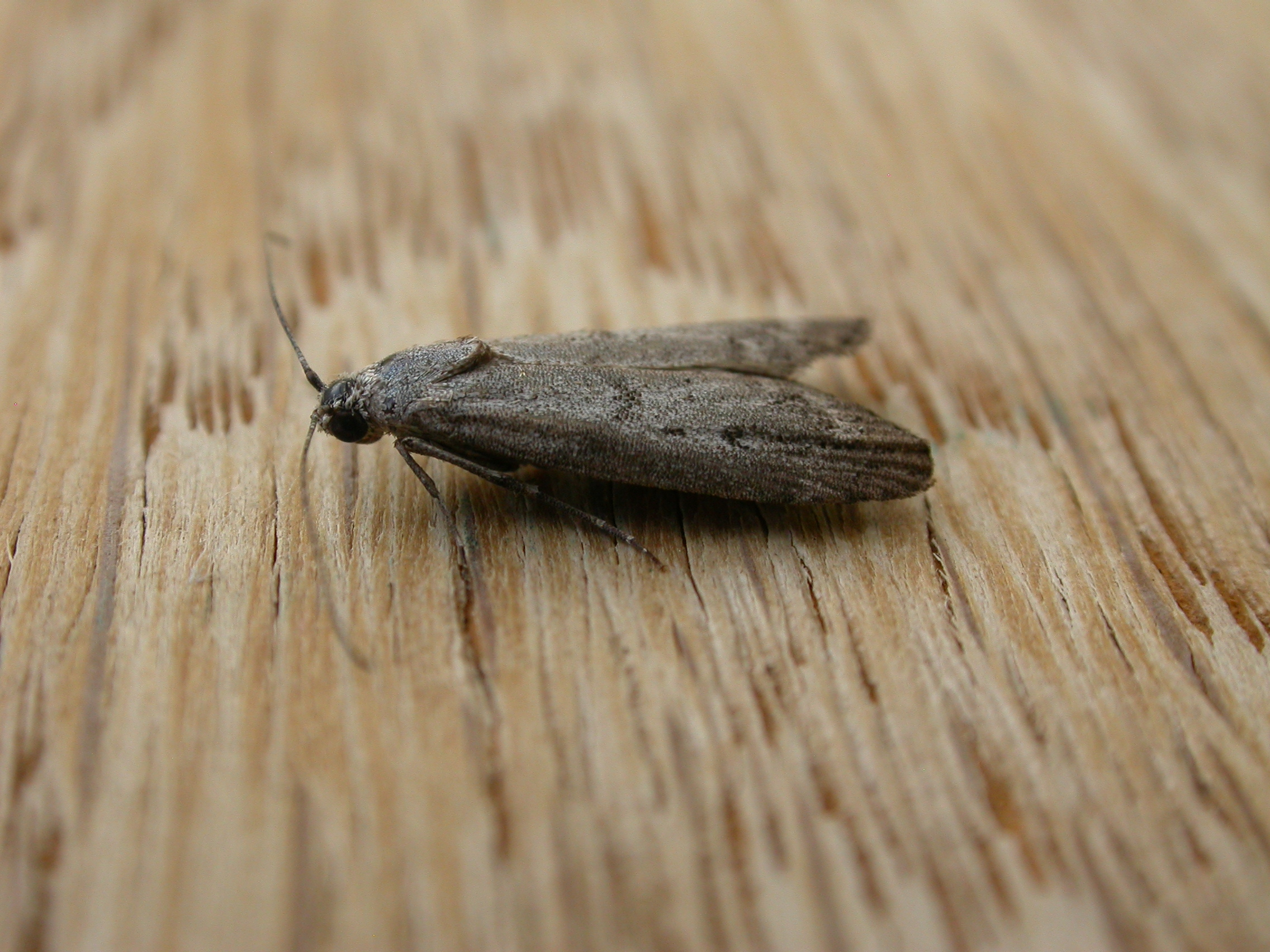

Scientific classification
- Kingdom: Animalia
- Phylum: Arthropoda
- Class: Insecta
- Order: Lepidoptera
- Family: Pyralidae
- Genus: Heteromicta
- Species: H. pachytera

Binomial name
- Heteromicta pachytera (Meyrick, 1880)

Synonyms
- Aphomia pachytera Meyrick, 1879

= Heteromicta pachytera =

Species of moth

Heteromicta pachytera is a species of moth of the family Pyralidae. It is found in Australia, including Queensland, New South Wales, Victoria, South Australia and Tasmania.

The wingspan is about 20 mm. The forewings have a grey pattern.
