= Yxygodes =

Scientific classification
- Kingdom: Animalia
- Phylum: Arthropoda
- Class: Insecta
- Order: Lepidoptera
- Family: Pyralidae
- Genus: Yxygodes; Viette, 1989

Genus of moths

Yxygodes is a genus of snout moths from Madagascar.

== Species ==
Some species of this genus are:

- Yxygodes bekilalis (Marion, 1954)
- Yxygodes insignis (Mabille, 1900)
- Yxygodes meranalis (Viette, 1960)
- Yxygodes olapalis (Viette, 1978)
- Yxygodes seyrigalis (Marion, 1954)
- Yxygodes vieualis (Viette, 1960)
- Yxygodes xyridotalis (Viette, 1960)
- Yxygodes zonalis (Mabille, 1900)
