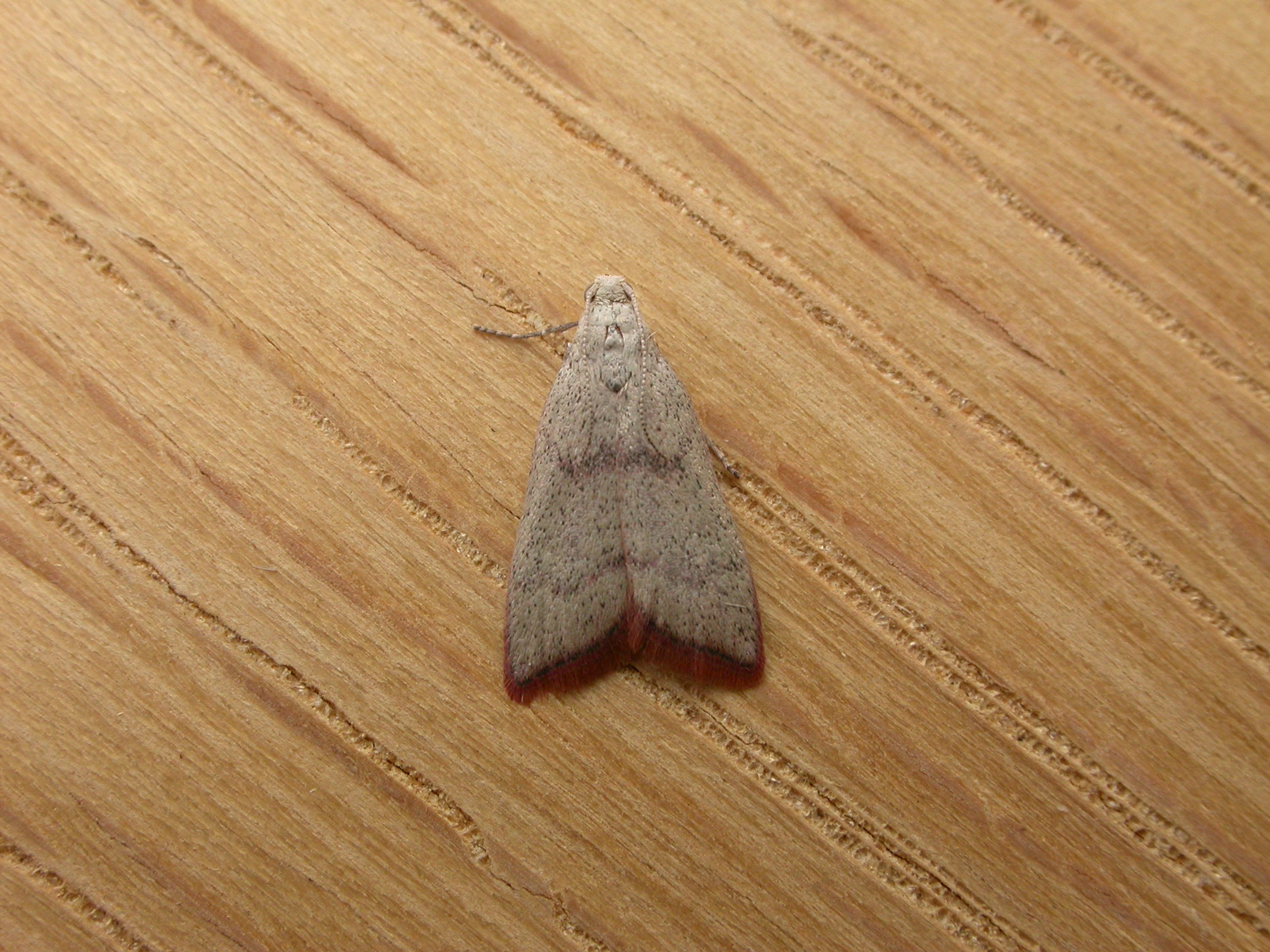

Scientific classification
- Kingdom: Animalia
- Phylum: Arthropoda
- Class: Insecta
- Order: Lepidoptera
- Family: Pyralidae
- Tribe: Tirathabini
- Genus: Callionyma; Meyrick, 1882
- Species: C. sarcodes

Binomial name
- Callionyma sarcodes Meyrick, 1882

Synonyms
- Genus: Eucallionyma Ragonot, 1901; Species: Eucallionyma sarcodes

= Callionyma =

Genus of moths

Callionyma is a monotypic snout moth genus. Its one species, Callionyma sarcodes, was described by Edward Meyrick in 1882. It is found in the southern half of Australia, including Tasmania.

The wingspan is about 20 mm.

The larvae feed on Eucalyptus species.
