= Cristia =

Scientific classification
- Kingdom: Animalia
- Phylum: Arthropoda
- Class: Insecta
- Order: Lepidoptera
- Family: Pyralidae
- Tribe: Tirathabini
- Genus: Cristia; Whalley, 1964
- Species: C. sericeana

Binomial name
- Cristia sericeana Whalley, 1964

Genus of moths

Cristia is a genus of snout moths. It was described in 1964 by Paul E.S. Whalley, who, in the same article also described the species C. sericeana which is known from New Guinea.
