= Neophrida =

Scientific classification
- Kingdom: Animalia
- Phylum: Arthropoda
- Class: Insecta
- Order: Lepidoptera
- Family: Pyralidae
- Tribe: Tirathabini
- Genus: Neophrida; Möschler, 1882

Genus of moths

Neophrida is a genus of snout moths. It was described by Heinrich Benno Möschler in 1882.

== Species ==
- Neophrida aurolimbalis Möschler, (1881) 1882
- Neophrida meterythralis Hampson, 1916
- Neophrida porphyrea Whalley, 1964
