= Acyperas rubrella =

Scientific classification
- Kingdom: Animalia
- Phylum: Arthropoda
- Clade: Pancrustacea
- Class: Insecta
- Order: Lepidoptera
- Family: Pyralidae
- Genus: Acyperas
- Species: A. rubrella

Binomial name
- Acyperas rubrella (Hampson in Ragonot, 1901)

Synonyms
- Omphalophora rubrella Hampson in Ragonot, 1901; Acara dohrni Hering, 1903

Species of moth

Acyperas rubrella is a species of snout moth in the genus Acyperas. It was described by George Hampson in 1901 and is known from Indonesia (Java and Sumatra).
