= Ceratothalama =

Scientific classification
- Kingdom: Animalia
- Phylum: Arthropoda
- Class: Insecta
- Order: Lepidoptera
- Family: Pyralidae
- Tribe: Tirathabini
- Genus: Ceratothalama; Meyrick, 1932
- Species: C. argosema

Binomial name
- Ceratothalama argosema Meyrick, 1932

Synonyms
- Genus: Ceratothalma Whalley, 1964; Species: Tirathaba chionophtalma Meyrick, 1934

Genus of moths

Ceratothalama is a monotypic snout moth genus. Its only species, Ceratothalama argosema, is known from Fiji. Both the genus and species were first described by Edward Meyrick in 1932.
