= Alpheias (moth) =

Scientific classification
- Kingdom: Animalia
- Phylum: Arthropoda
- Class: Insecta
- Order: Lepidoptera
- Family: Pyralidae
- Tribe: Cacotherapiini
- Genus: Alpheias; Ragonot, 1891

Synonyms
- Amestria Ragonot, 1891

Genus of moths

Alpheias is a genus of snout moths. It was described by Émile Louis Ragonot in 1891, and is known from Mexico, Jamaica, and the US states of California and Texas.

== Species ==
- Alpheias baccalis Ragonot, 1891
- Alpheias bipunctalis Hampson, 1919
- Alpheias conspirata Heinrich, 1940
- Alpheias gitonalis Ragonot, 1891
- Alpheias oculiferalis (Ragonot, 1891)
- Alpheias querula Dyar, 1913
- Alpheias transferens Dyar, 1913
- Alpheias vicarilis Dyar, 1913
