= Cataprosopus =

Scientific classification
- Kingdom: Animalia
- Phylum: Arthropoda
- Class: Insecta
- Order: Lepidoptera
- Family: Pyralidae
- Tribe: Megarthridiini
- Genus: Cataprosopus; Butler, 1881

Synonyms
- Lophopalpia Warren, 1896; Omphalobasis Hampson, 1896

Genus of moths

Cataprosopus is a genus of the snout moth. It was described by Arthur Gardiner Butler in 1881 and is known from India, China, and Japan.

== Species ==
- Cataprosopus chalybopicta (Warren, 1896)
- Cataprosopus chapalis (de Joannis, 1929)
- Cataprosopus melli (Caradja & Meyrick, 1933)
- Cataprosopus monstrosus Butler, 1881
