= Antiptilotis =

Scientific classification
- Kingdom: Animalia
- Phylum: Arthropoda
- Class: Insecta
- Order: Lepidoptera
- Family: Pyralidae
- Tribe: Tirathabini
- Genus: Antiptilotis; Meyrick, 1897
- Species: A. rubicunda

Binomial name
- Antiptilotis rubicunda Meyrick, 1897

Synonyms
- Melissoblaptes eucheliellus Snellen, 1901

Genus of moths

Antiptilotis is a genus of snout moths. It was described by Edward Meyrick in 1897 and contains the species Antiptilotis rubicunda. It is found in Indonesia (Java and Sulawesi).
