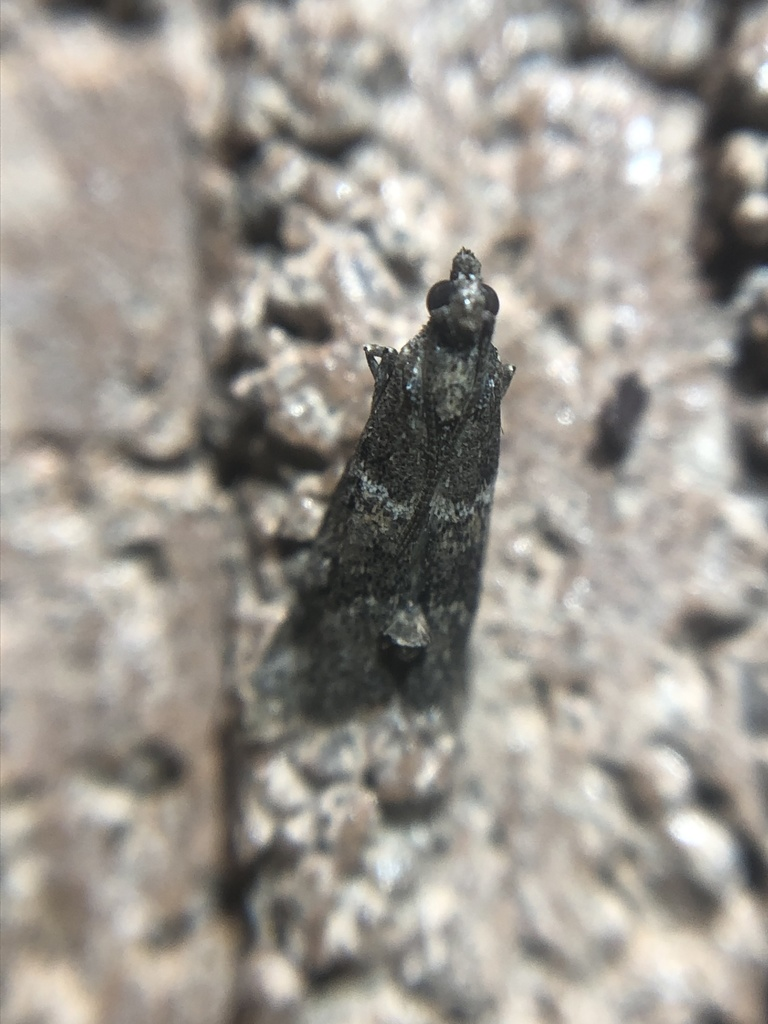

Scientific classification
- Kingdom: Animalia
- Phylum: Arthropoda
- Class: Insecta
- Order: Lepidoptera
- Family: Pyralidae
- Tribe: Cacotherapiini
- Genus: Alpheioides; Barnes & McDunnough, 1912
- Species: A. parvulalis

Binomial name
- Alpheioides parvulalis Barnes & McDunnough, 1912

= Alpheioides =

Genus of moths

Alpheioides is a genus of snout moths. It was described by William Barnes and James Halliday McDunnough in 1912, and contains the species Alpheioides parvulalis. It is found in North America, including southern California, Arizona and Oklahoma.
