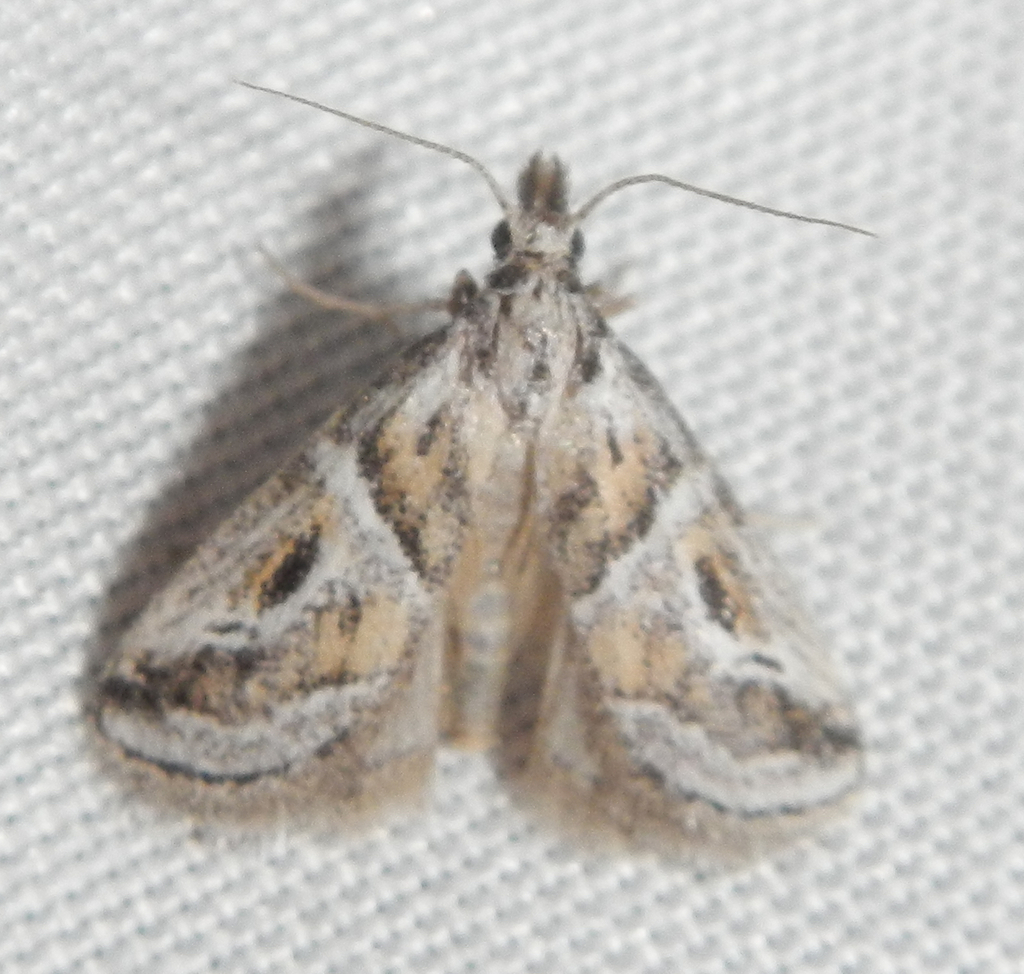

Scientific classification
- Kingdom: Animalia
- Phylum: Arthropoda
- Class: Insecta
- Order: Lepidoptera
- Family: Pyralidae
- Genus: Decaturia; Barnes & McDunnough, 1912
- Species: D. pectinalis

Binomial name
- Decaturia pectinalis Barnes & McDunnough, 1912

= Decaturia =

Genus of moths

Decaturia is a monotypic snout moth genus (family Pyralidae). Its only species, Decaturia pectinalis, is found from California to southern Arizona. Both the genus and species were described by William Barnes of Decatur, Illinois, and James Halliday McDunnough in 1912.

The wingspan is about 13 mm.
