= Megarthridia =

Scientific classification
- Kingdom: Animalia
- Phylum: Arthropoda
- Class: Insecta
- Order: Lepidoptera
- Family: Pyralidae
- Tribe: Megarthridiini
- Genus: Megarthridia; E. L. Martin, 1956
- Species: M. canosparsalis

Binomial name
- Megarthridia canosparsalis (Hampson, 1896)

Synonyms
- Genus: Megarthria Hampson, 1893; Species: Omphalocera canosparsalis Hampson, 1896; Megarthria velutinella Hampson, 1899

Genus of moths

Megarthridia is a monotypic snout moth genus described by E. L. Martin in 1956. Its single species, described by George Hampson in 1896, Megarthridia canosparsalis, is known from Burma and India (Sikkim).
