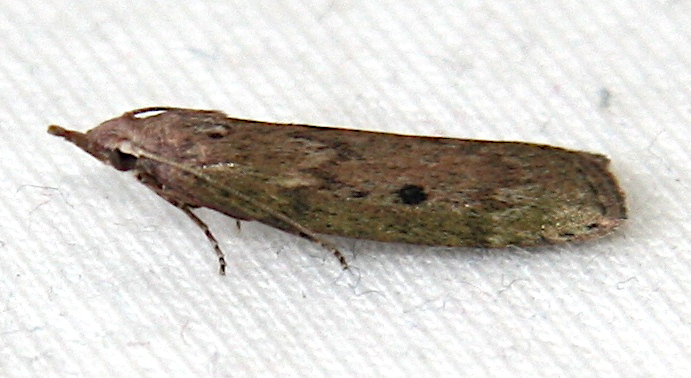

Scientific classification
- Domain: Eukaryota
- Kingdom: Animalia
- Phylum: Arthropoda
- Class: Insecta
- Order: Lepidoptera
- Family: Pyralidae
- Genus: Paralipsa
- Species: P. gularis

Binomial name
- Paralipsa gularis (Zeller, 1877)

Synonyms
- Melissoblaptes gularis Zeller, 1877; Aphomia gularis; Paralispa modesta Butler, 1879; Melissoblaptes tenebrosus Butler, 1879

= Paralipsa gularis =

Species of moth

Paralipsa gularis, the stored nut moth, is a moth of the family Pyralidae. It is found in Southeast Asia and is an introduced species in Western Europe.

The wingspan is 21–32 mm.

The caterpillars feed on stored nuts and seeds like walnut, almond, soybean and flax.
