= Neoepimorius =

Scientific classification
- Kingdom: Animalia
- Phylum: Arthropoda
- Class: Insecta
- Order: Lepidoptera
- Family: Pyralidae
- Tribe: Tirathabini
- Genus: Neoepimorius; Whalley, 1964

Genus of moths

Neoepimorius is a genus of snout moths. It was described by Paul Ernest Sutton Whalley in 1964.

== Species ==
- Neoepimorius lineola Whalley, 1964
- Neoepimorius maroni Whalley, 1964
