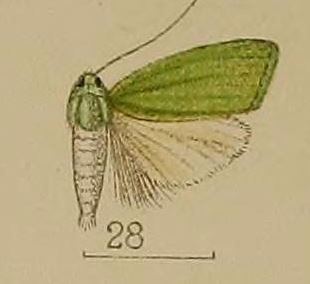
- Prasinoxena metaleuca

Scientific classification
- Kingdom: Animalia
- Phylum: Arthropoda
- Class: Insecta
- Order: Lepidoptera
- Family: Pyralidae
- Subfamily: Galleriinae
- Genus: Prasinoxena; Meyrick, 1894

= Prasinoxena =

Genus of moths

Prasinoxena is a genus of moths in the family Pyralidae. The genus was created by Edward Meyrick in 1894.

== Distribution and habitat ==
Species in the genus are found across India and the Indonesian archipelago.

== Species ==
The genus Prasinoxena contains six species:

- Prasinoxena astroteles
- Prasinoxena bilineella (Hampson, 1901)
- Prasinoxena hemisema (Meyrick, 1894)
- Prasinoxena metaleuca (Hampson, 1912)
- Prasinoxena monospila (Meyrick, 1894)
- Prasinoxena viridissima (Swinhoe, 1903)
