= Epimorius =

Scientific classification
- Kingdom: Animalia
- Phylum: Arthropoda
- Clade: Pancrustacea
- Class: Insecta
- Order: Lepidoptera
- Family: Pyralidae
- Tribe: Tirathabini
- Genus: Epimorius; Zeller, 1877

Synonyms
- Athaliptis Schaus, 1913

Genus of moths

Epimorius is a genus of snout moths. It was described by Philipp Christoph Zeller in 1877.

== Species ==
- Epimorius caribellus Ferguson, 1991
- Epimorius cymonia (Schaus, 1913)
- Epimorius maylinae Solis, 2003
- Epimorius prodigiosa Whalley, 1964
- Epimorius suffusus (Zeller, 1877)
- Epimorius testaceellus Ragonot, 1887
