= Acyperas =

Scientific classification
- Kingdom: Animalia
- Phylum: Arthropoda
- Clade: Pancrustacea
- Class: Insecta
- Order: Lepidoptera
- Family: Pyralidae
- Subfamily: Galleriinae
- Genus: Acyperas; Hampson in Ragonot, 1901

Synonyms
- Omphalophora Hampson in Ragonot, 1901 (non Becker, 1900: preoccupied)

Genus of moths

Acyperas is a genus of snout moths in the subfamily Galleriinae. It was described by George Hampson in 1901 and is known from Papua New Guinea and Java, Indonesia.

== Species ==
- Acyperas aurantiacella Hampson in Ragonot, 1901
- Acyperas rubrella (Hampson in Ragonot, 1901)
