= Genopaschia =

Scientific classification
- Kingdom: Animalia
- Phylum: Arthropoda
- Class: Insecta
- Order: Lepidoptera
- Family: Pyralidae
- Tribe: Cacotherapiini
- Genus: Genopaschia; Dyar, 1914
- Species: G. protomis

Binomial name
- Genopaschia protomis Dyar, 1914

Synonyms
- Genus: Pseudotricha Schaus, 1940; Species: Pseudotricha irenealis Schaus, 1940

Genus of moths

Genopaschia is a monotypic snout moth genus. It was described by Harrison Gray Dyar Jr. in 1914 and is known from Panama and Puerto Rico. It contains the species Genopaschia protomis.
