= Eulophopalpia =

Scientific classification
- Kingdom: Animalia
- Phylum: Arthropoda
- Class: Insecta
- Order: Lepidoptera
- Family: Pyralidae
- Tribe: Megarthridiini
- Genus: Eulophopalpia; Inoue, 1982
- Species: E. pauperalis

Binomial name
- Eulophopalpia pauperalis (Leech, 1889)

Synonyms
- Genus: Lophopalpia Hampson, 1896; Species: Cataprosopus pauperalis Leech, 1889

Genus of moths

Eulophopalpia is a genus of snout moths. It was described by Hiroshi Inoue in 1982, and is known from Japan. It contains the species E. pauperalis.

The wingspan is about 28 mm.
