= Metaraphia =

Scientific classification
- Kingdom: Animalia
- Phylum: Arthropoda
- Class: Insecta
- Order: Lepidoptera
- Family: Pyralidae
- Tribe: Tirathabini
- Genus: Metaraphia; Hampson in Ragonot, 1901
- Species: M. postluteella

Binomial name
- Metaraphia postluteella Hampson in Ragonot, 1901

Synonyms
- Metarphia Whalley, 1964

Genus of moths

Metaraphia is a monotypic snout moth genus. Its one species, Metaraphia postluteella, was described by George Hampson in 1901 and is known from Borneo.
