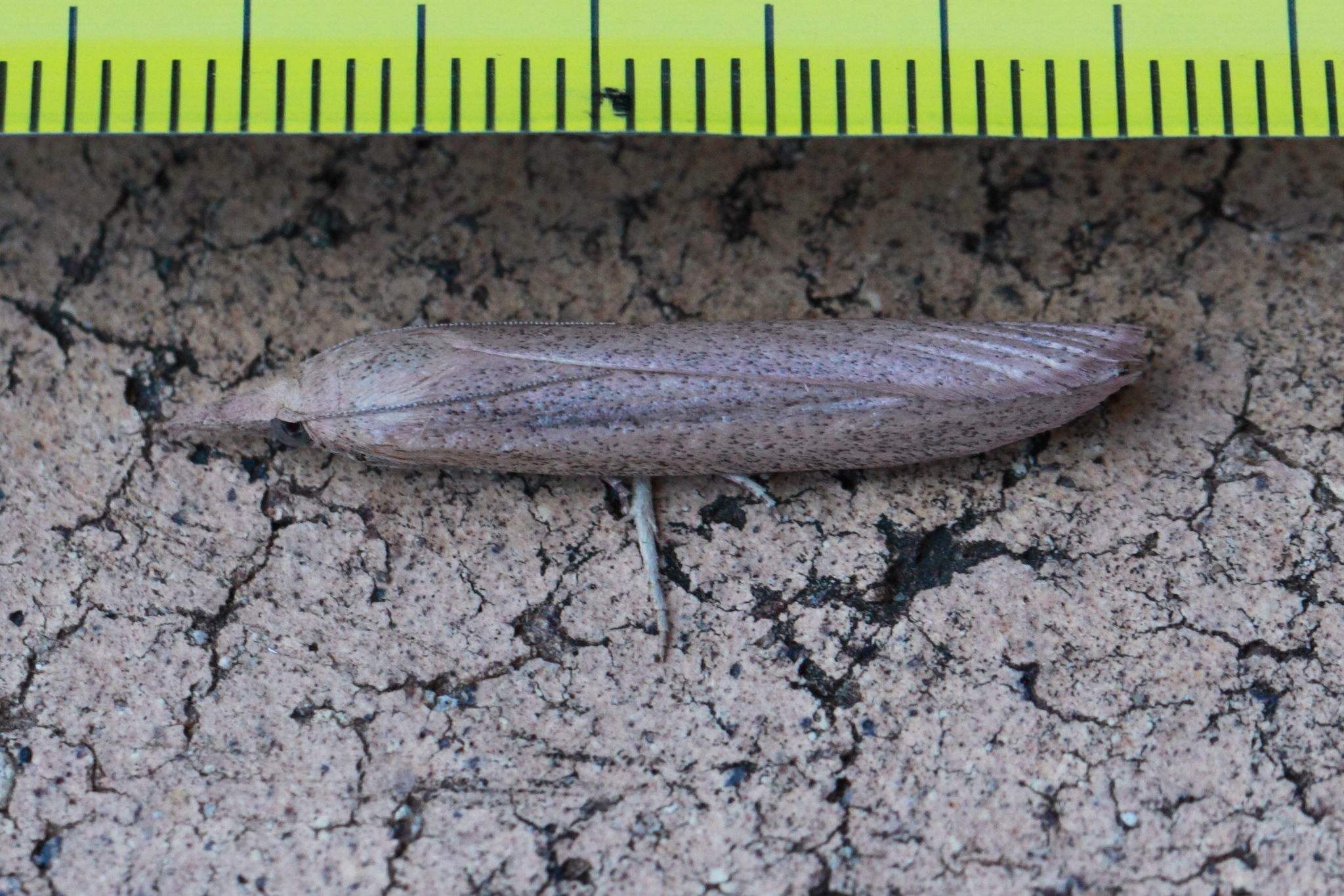

Scientific classification
- Kingdom: Animalia
- Phylum: Arthropoda
- Class: Insecta
- Order: Lepidoptera
- Family: Pyralidae
- Genus: Meyriccia; Hampson, 1917
- Species: M. latro

Binomial name
- Meyriccia latro (Zeller, 1873)

Synonyms
- Genus: Meyrickia Ragonot, 1901; Hylaletis Meyrick, 1932; Hyaletis Whalley, 1964; Species: Melissoblaptes latro Zeller, 1873

= Meyriccia =

Meyriccia latro

Genus of moths

Meyriccia is a genus of snout moths. It is monotypic, with a single species, Meyriccia latro, that is found in Australia.

The wingspan is about 30 mm.

The larvae feed on Xanthorrhoea species, including Xanthorrhoea semiplana. They live communally in silken webs and bore holes in the seed heads of their host plant. They reach a length of about 20 mm.
