= M. exigua =

M. exigua may refer to:

- Madia exigua, a western North American plant
- Meloidogyne exigua, a coffee root-knot nematode
- Micromystix exigua, a snout moth
- Micropyxis exigua, a perennial herb
- Miresa exigua, a slug moth
- Mitromorpha exigua, a sea snail
- Mordellistena exigua, a tumbling flower beetle
- Mycosphaerella exigua, a plant pathogen
- Myrmecia exigua, a bulldog ant
- Myrmica exigua, an ant with a binodal petiole
- Myrmicaria exigua, an ant with an antenna with seven segments
