= Nhoabe mocquerysalis =

Scientific classification
- Kingdom: Animalia
- Phylum: Arthropoda
- Class: Insecta
- Order: Lepidoptera
- Superfamily: Pyraloidea
- Family: Pyralidae
- Subfamily: Pyralinae
- Genus: Nhoabe
- Species: N. mocquerysalis

Binomial name
- Nhoabe mocquerysalis Viette, 1953

Species of moth

Nhoabe mocquerysalis is a species of snout moth, and the type species in the genus Nhoabe. It was described by Viette in 1953, and is known from Madagascar.
