= Nhoabe millotalis =

Scientific classification
- Kingdom: Animalia
- Phylum: Arthropoda
- Class: Insecta
- Order: Lepidoptera
- Superfamily: Pyraloidea
- Family: Pyralidae
- Subfamily: Pyralinae
- Genus: Nhoabe
- Species: N. millotalis

Binomial name
- Nhoabe millotalis Viette, 1953

Species of moth

Nhoabe millotalis is a species of snout moth in the genus Nhoabe. It was described by Viette in 1953, and is known from Madagascar.
