= Nhoabe privatalis =

Scientific classification
- Kingdom: Animalia
- Phylum: Arthropoda
- Class: Insecta
- Order: Lepidoptera
- Superfamily: Pyraloidea
- Family: Pyralidae
- Subfamily: Pyralinae
- Genus: Nhoabe
- Species: N. privatalis

Binomial name
- Nhoabe privatalis Viette, 1960

Species of moth

Nhoabe privatalis is a species of snout moth in the genus Nhoabe. It was described by Viette in 1960, and is known from the Comoro Islands.
