= Nhoabe viettealis =

Scientific classification
- Domain: Eukaryota
- Kingdom: Animalia
- Phylum: Arthropoda
- Class: Insecta
- Order: Lepidoptera
- Superfamily: Pyraloidea
- Family: Pyralidae
- Subfamily: Pyralinae
- Genus: Nhoabe
- Species: N. viettealis

Binomial name
- Nhoabe viettealis (Marion, 1955)

Synonyms
- Betsimisaraka viettealis Marion, 1955

Species of moth

Nhoabe viettealis is a species of snout moth in the genus Nhoabe. It was described by Hubert Marion in 1955 and is known from Madagascar.

== Subspecies ==
- Nhoabe viettealis suarezalis P. Leraut, 2006
