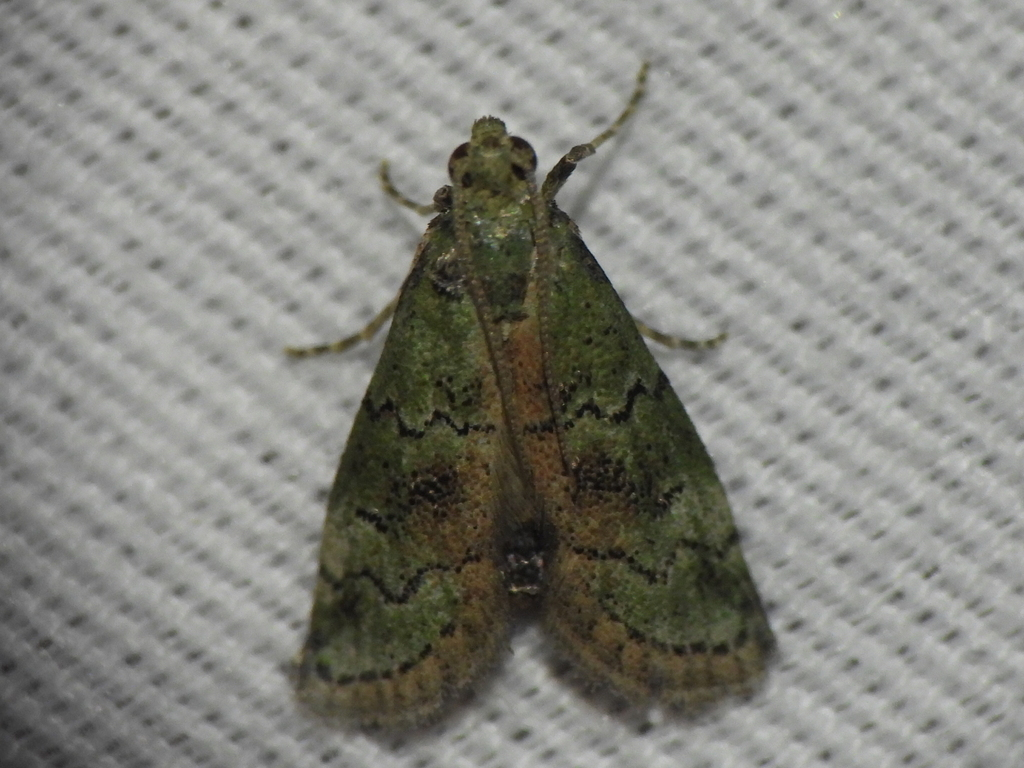

Scientific classification
- Kingdom: Animalia
- Phylum: Arthropoda
- Clade: Pancrustacea
- Class: Insecta
- Order: Lepidoptera
- Family: Pyralidae
- Genus: Cacotherapia
- Species: C. flexilinealis

Binomial name
- Cacotherapia flexilinealis Dyar, 1905

= Cacotherapia flexilinealis =

Species of moth

Cacotherapia flexilinealis is a species of snout moth in the genus Cacotherapia. It was described by Harrison Gray Dyar Jr. in 1905 and is known from the US state of Texas.
