= Pyralosis galactalis =

Scientific classification
- Kingdom: Animalia
- Phylum: Arthropoda
- Clade: Pancrustacea
- Class: Insecta
- Order: Lepidoptera
- Family: Pyralidae
- Genus: Pyralosis
- Species: P. galactalis

Binomial name
- Pyralosis galactalis Hampson, 1916

Species of moth

Pyralosis galactalis is a species of moth in the family Pyralidae. It was described by Sir George Francis Hampson, 10th Baronet in 1916. This species can be found in southern and eastern Africa.
