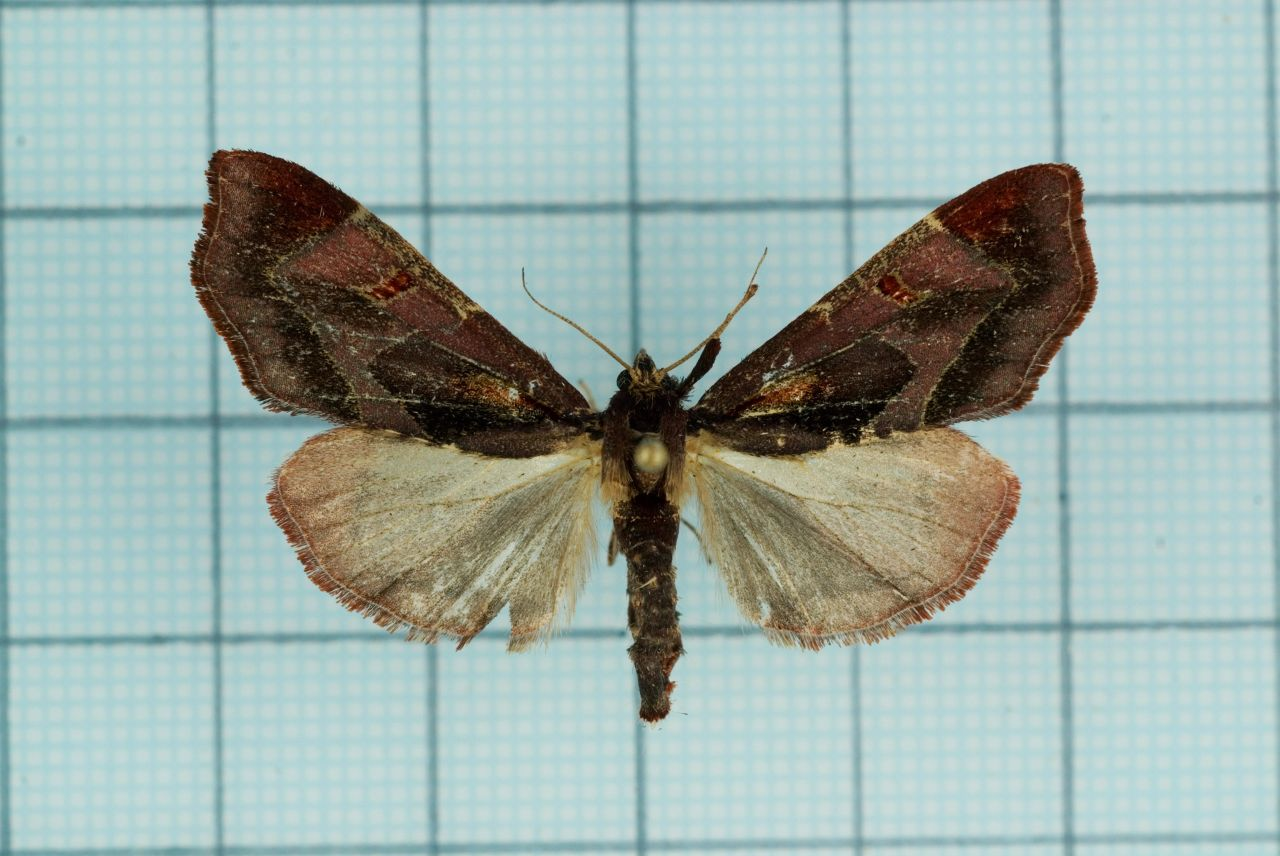

Scientific classification
- Kingdom: Animalia
- Phylum: Arthropoda
- Class: Insecta
- Order: Lepidoptera
- Family: Pyralidae
- Subfamily: Pyralinae
- Genus: Sybrida; Walker, 1865

= Sybrida =

Genus of moths

Sybrida is a genus of snout moths.

== Species ==
- Sybrida amethystalis Ghesquière, 1942
- Sybrida angulata Ghesquière, 1942
- Sybrida atroviolacea Ghesquière, 1942
- Sybrida dipenthes Meyrick, 1934
- Sybrida fulva Ghesquière, 1942
- Sybrida inordinata Walker, 1865
- Sybrida latericia Ghesquière, 1942
- Sybrida misakiensis Shibuya, 1928
- Sybrida ragonotalis Snellen, 1892
- Sybrida rhodinalis Hampson, 1906
- Sybrida roccelina Ghesquière, 1942
- Sybrida roseolurida Ghesquière, 1942
- Sybrida subviolacea Ghesquière, 1942

== Former species ==
- Sybrida approximans (Leech, 1888) is mostly placed in the genus Sacada
- Sybrida discinota (Moore, 1866) is mostly placed in the genus Sacada
