= Cacotherapia demeridalis =

Scientific classification
- Kingdom: Animalia
- Phylum: Arthropoda
- Class: Insecta
- Order: Lepidoptera
- Family: Pyralidae
- Genus: Cacotherapia
- Species: C. demeridalis

Binomial name
- Cacotherapia demeridalis (Schaus, 1924)

Synonyms
- Microcausta demeridalis Schaus, 1924

Species of moth

Cacotherapia demeridalis is a species of snout moth in the genus Cacotherapia. It was described by William Schaus in 1924, and is known from Guatemala.
