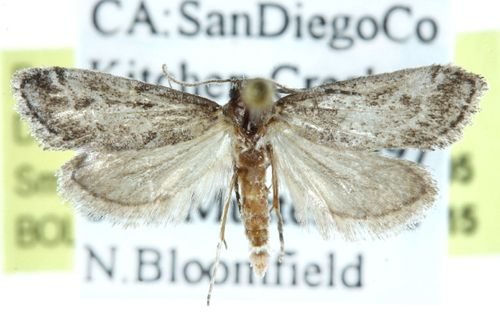

Scientific classification
- Kingdom: Animalia
- Phylum: Arthropoda
- Class: Insecta
- Order: Lepidoptera
- Family: Pyralidae
- Genus: Cacotherapia
- Species: C. ponda

Binomial name
- Cacotherapia ponda Dyar, 1907

= Cacotherapia ponda =

Species of moth

Cacotherapia ponda is a species of snout moth in the genus Cacotherapia. It was described by Harrison Gray Dyar Jr. in 1907 and is known from the US state of California.
