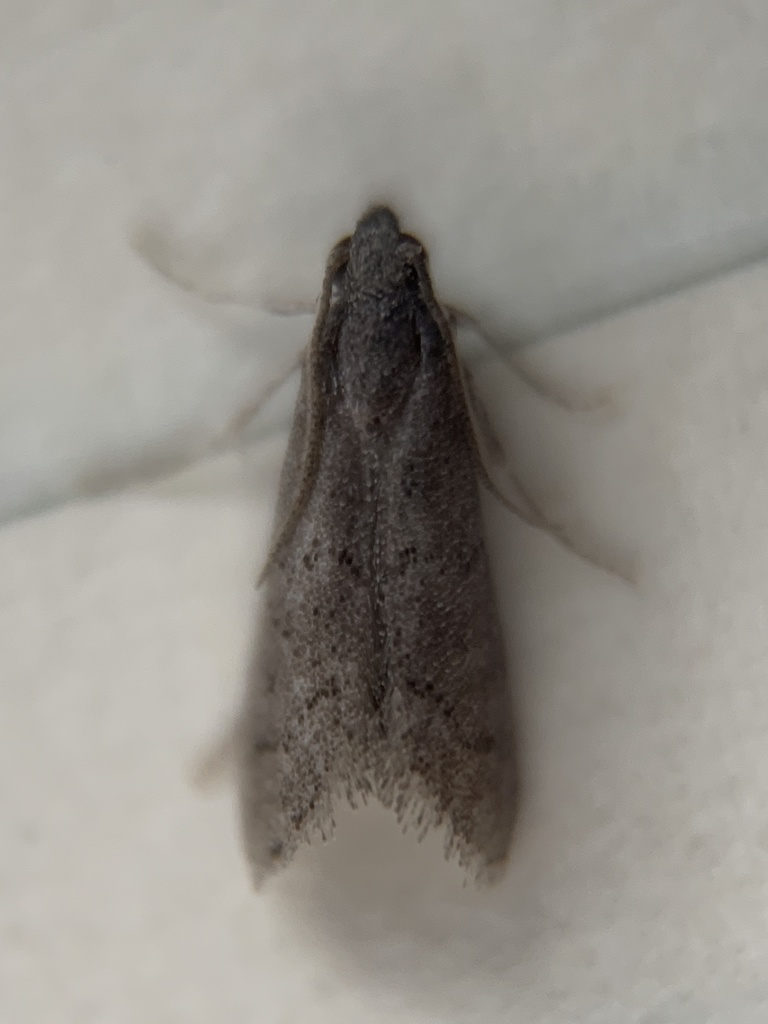

Scientific classification
- Kingdom: Animalia
- Phylum: Arthropoda
- Class: Insecta
- Order: Lepidoptera
- Family: Pyralidae
- Genus: Cacotherapia
- Species: C. unicoloralis

Binomial name
- Cacotherapia unicoloralis (Barnes & McDunnough, 1913)

Synonyms
- Macrotheca unicoloralis Barnes & McDunnough, 1913

= Cacotherapia unicoloralis =

Species of moth

Cacotherapia unicoloralis is a species of snout moth in the genus Cacotherapia. It was described by William Barnes and James Halliday McDunnough in 1913 and is known from the US state of Florida.
