= Falsoterinaea fuscorufa =

Scientific classification
- Domain: Eukaryota
- Kingdom: Animalia
- Phylum: Arthropoda
- Class: Insecta
- Order: Coleoptera
- Suborder: Polyphaga
- Infraorder: Cucujiformia
- Family: Cerambycidae
- Genus: Falsoterinaea
- Species: F. fuscorufa

Binomial name
- Falsoterinaea fuscorufa (Matsushita, 1937)

Synonyms
- Hirayamaia fuscorufa Matsushita, 1937

Species of beetle

Falsoterinaea fuscorufa is a species of beetle in the family Cerambycidae. It was described by Masaki Matsushita in 1937, originally under the genus Hirayamaia.
