= Cacotherapia lecerfialis =

Scientific classification
- Kingdom: Animalia
- Phylum: Arthropoda
- Class: Insecta
- Order: Lepidoptera
- Family: Pyralidae
- Genus: Cacotherapia
- Species: C. lecerfialis

Binomial name
- Cacotherapia lecerfialis (Barnes & Benjamin, 1925)

Synonyms
- Macrotheca lecerfialis Barnes & Benjamin, 1925

Species of moth

Cacotherapia lecerfialis is a species of snout moth in the genus Cacotherapia. It was described by William Barnes and Foster Hendrickson Benjamin in 1925 and is known from the US state of California.
