= Eugene G. Munroe =

Canadian entomologist (1919–2008)

- Born: Eugene Gordon Munroe; 8 September 1919
- Died: 31 May 2008 (aged 88)
- Occupation: Entomologist
- Scientific career
- Fields: Entomology

Eugene Gordon Munroe (8 September 1919 – 31 May 2008) was a Canadian entomologist who discovered numerous species of insects. He worked for the Insect Systematics and Biological Control Unit, Entomology Division in Ottawa, Ontario, Canada.

Munroe was "the acknowledged authority on the Pyraloidea worldwide for many years". From 1976 to 1982, he also served as editor-in-chief of Moths of America North of Mexico.

== Authored taxa ==
- Category:Taxa named by Eugene G. Munroe

== Publications ==
Monroe published more than 200 papers, including:

- Munroe, E.G. 1948: The geographical distribution of butterflies in the West Indies. Ph.D. thesis. Cornell University, Ithaca, New York.
- Munroe, E.G. 1959: New Pyralidae from the Papuan Region (Lepidoptera). The Canadian Entomologist, 91(2): 102–112.
- Munroe, E.G. 1960: New Tropical Pyraustinae (Lepidoptera: Pyralidae). The Canadian Entomologist, 92(3): 164–173.
- Munroe, E.G. 1960a: A New Genus of Pyralidae and its Species (Lepidoptera). The Canadian Entomologist, 92(3): 188–192.
- Munroe, E.G., Mutuura, A. 1968: Contributions to a study of the Pyraustinae (Lepidoptera: Pyralidae) of temperate East Asia II. The Canadian Entomologist, 100(8): 861–868.
- Munroe, E.G., Mutuura, A. 1968a: Contributions to a study of the Pyraustinae (Lepidoptera: Pyralidae) of temperate East Asia I. The Canadian Entomologist, 100(8): 847–861. doi: 10.4039/Ent100847-8.
- Mutuura, A., Munroe, E.G. 1970: Taxonomy and distribution of the European corn borer and allied species: Genus Ostrinia (Lepidoptera: Pyralidae). Memoirs of the Entomological Society of Canada, 112 (supplement 71): 1–112.
- Shaffer, J.C. & Munroe, E., 1989. Type Material Of 4 African Species Of Notarcha Meyrick, With Designations Of Lectotypes And Changes In Synonymy (Lepidoptera, Crambidae, Pyraustinae). Proceedings of the Entomological Society of Washington 91: 248–256
- Shaffer, J.C. & Munroe, E., 1989. Type material of two Peruvian species of Herpetogramma and one of Pleuroptya (Lepidoptera: Crambidae: Pyraustinae). Proceedings of the Entomological Society of Washington 91: 414–420
