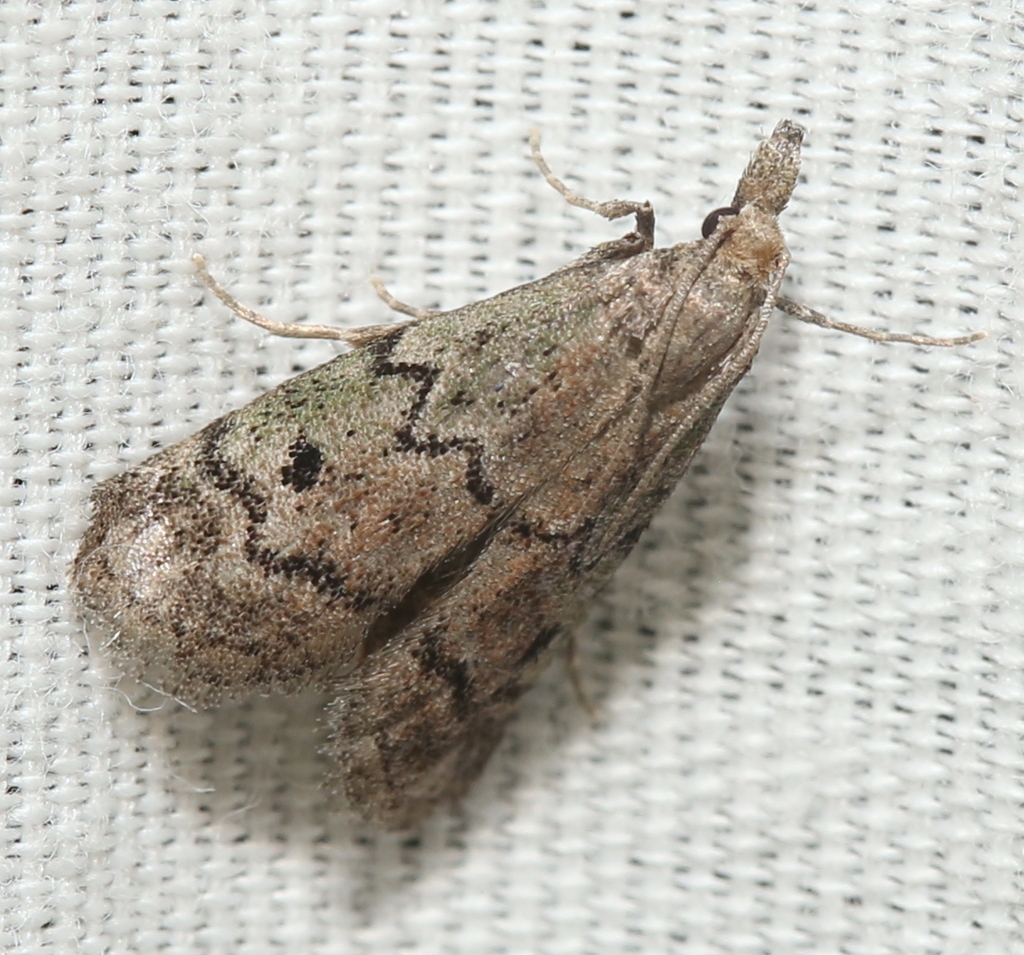

Scientific classification
- Kingdom: Animalia
- Phylum: Arthropoda
- Class: Insecta
- Order: Lepidoptera
- Family: Pyralidae
- Genus: Cacotherapia
- Species: C. unipuncta

Binomial name
- Cacotherapia unipuncta (Dyar, 1913)

Synonyms
- Macrotheca unipuncta Dyar, 1913

= Cacotherapia unipuncta =

Species of moth

Cacotherapia unipuncta is a species of snout moth in the genus Cacotherapia. It was described by Harrison Gray Dyar Jr. in 1913, and is known from North America, including Pennsylvania, Tennessee and North Carolina.
