= D. fimbriata =

D. fimbriata may refer to:

- Daphnellopsis fimbriata, a sea snail species
- Diloxia fimbriata, a moth species
- Drosera fimbriata, a carnivorous plant species
