= Cacotherapia nigrocinereella =

Scientific classification
- Kingdom: Animalia
- Phylum: Arthropoda
- Class: Insecta
- Order: Lepidoptera
- Family: Pyralidae
- Genus: Cacotherapia
- Species: C. nigrocinereella

Binomial name
- Cacotherapia nigrocinereella (Hulst, 1900)

Synonyms
- Aurora nigrocinereella Hulst, 1900

Species of moth

Cacotherapia nigrocinereella is a species of snout moth in the genus Cacotherapia. It was described by George Duryea Hulst in 1900 and is known from the US state of Texas.
