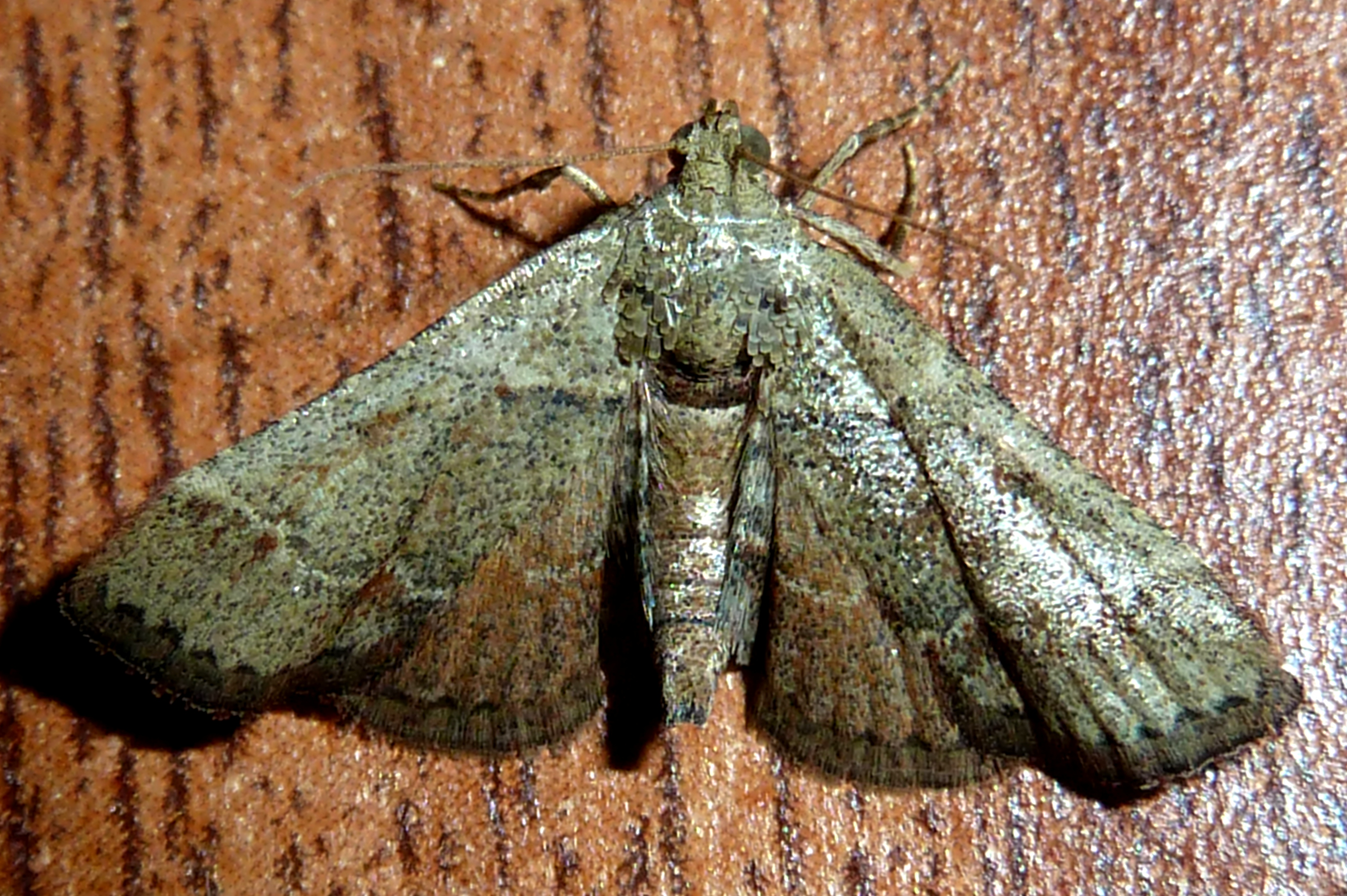
- Tegulifera zonalis

Scientific classification
- Kingdom: Animalia
- Phylum: Arthropoda
- Clade: Pancrustacea
- Class: Insecta
- Order: Lepidoptera
- Family: Pyralidae
- Subfamily: Pyralinae
- Genus: Tegulifera; Saalmüller, 1880

Synonyms
- Sphalerosticha Warren, 1897

= Tegulifera =

Genus of moths

Tegulifera is a genus of snout moths described by Max Saalmüller in 1880. Some authorities list it as a synonym of Zitha.

== Type species ==
- Tegulifera rubicundalis Saalmüller, 1880

== Species ==
Some species of this genus are:

- Tegulifera albostrigalis Saalmüller, 1880
- Tegulifera anneliese Viette, 1981
- Tegulifera audeoudi de Joannis, 1927
- Tegulifera bostralis Hampson, 1917
- Tegulifera capuronalis Viette, 1960
- Tegulifera catalalis Marion & Viette, 1956
- Tegulifera chromalis Hampson, 1917
- Tegulifera conisalis Hampson, 1917
- Tegulifera contestalis (Caradja, 1925)
- Tegulifera cyanealis (Mabille, 1879)
- Tegulifera elaeomesa Hampson, 1918
- Tegulifera flaveola Hampson, 1917
- Tegulifera flavirubralis (Hampson, 1906)
- Tegulifera gallienalis Viette, 1960
- Tegulifera herbulotalis Marion, 1954
- Tegulifera holothermalis Hampson, 1906
- Tegulifera humberti Viette, 1973
- Tegulifera irroralis Hampson, 1917
- Tegulifera kwangtungialis Caradja, 1925
- Tegulifera lanitralis Viette, 1978
- Tegulifera lignosalis Viette, 1960
- Tegulifera marionalis Viette, 1960
- Tegulifera metasarcistis Hampson, 1917
- Tegulifera millotalis Viette, 1960
- Tegulifera nosivolalis Viette, 1960
- Tegulifera oblunata (Warren, 1897)
- Tegulifera obovalis Hampson, 1917
- Tegulifera ochrealis Hampson, 1917
- Tegulifera ochrimesalis Hampson, 1917
- Tegulifera pallidalis Hampson, 1917
- Tegulifera pernalis Viette, 1960
- Tegulifera purpurascens Hampson, 1917
- Tegulifera radamalis Viette, 196
- Tegulifera rosalinde Viette, 1981
- Tegulifera rubicundalis Saalmüller, 1880
- Tegulifera sanguinalis Marion, 1954
- Tegulifera sanguinea Warren, 1891
- Tegulifera semicircularis Hampson, 1917
- Tegulifera tristiculalis Saalmüller, 1880
- Tegulifera zombitsalis Viette, 1960
- Tegulifera zonalis (Warren, 1897)
