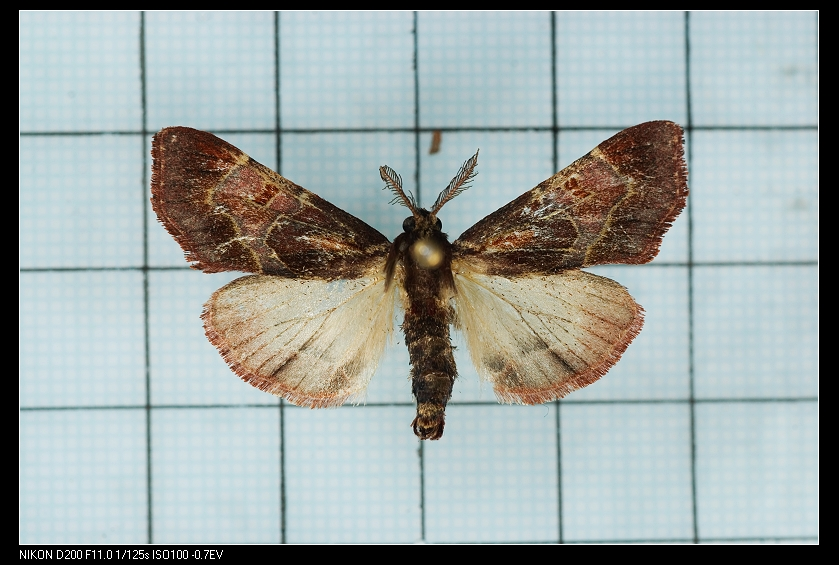

Scientific classification
- Kingdom: Animalia
- Phylum: Arthropoda
- Class: Insecta
- Order: Lepidoptera
- Family: Pyralidae
- Genus: Sacada
- Species: S. discinota

Binomial name
- Sacada discinota (Moore, 1866)

Synonyms
- Paravetta discinota Moore, 1866; Sybrida discinota

= Sacada discinota =

Species of moth

Sacada discinota is a species of moth of the family Pyralidae described by Frederic Moore in 1866. It is found in India and Taiwan.
