= Arsenaria wiltshirei =

Scientific classification
- Domain: Eukaryota
- Kingdom: Animalia
- Phylum: Arthropoda
- Class: Insecta
- Order: Lepidoptera
- Family: Pyralidae
- Genus: Arsenaria
- Species: A. wiltshirei

Binomial name
- Arsenaria wiltshirei (Amsel, 1949)

Synonyms
- Constantia wiltshirei Amsel, 1949

Species of moth

Arsenaria wiltshirei is a species of snout moth in the genus Arsenaria. It was described by Hans Georg Amsel in 1949 and is known from Iraq.
