= Epacternis flavimedialis =

Scientific classification
- Kingdom: Animalia
- Phylum: Arthropoda
- Class: Insecta
- Order: Lepidoptera
- Family: Pyralidae
- Genus: Epacternis
- Species: E. flavimedialis

Binomial name
- Epacternis flavimedialis (Hampson, 1906)

Synonyms
- Pyralis flavimedialis Hampson, 1906

Species of moth

Epacternis flavimedialis is a species of snout moth in the genus Epacternis. It was described by George Hampson in 1906 and is known from Angola, Benin, the Central African Republic, Ivory Coast, Ethiopia and Nigeria.
