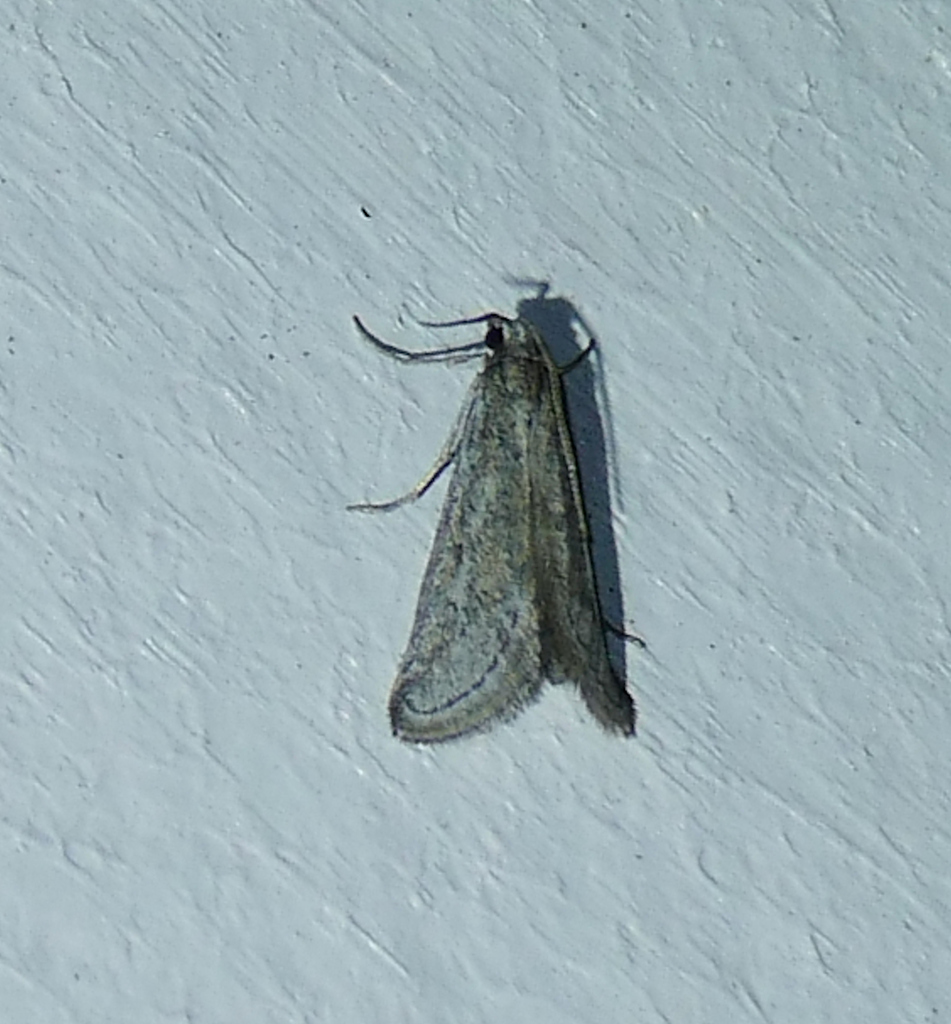

Scientific classification
- Kingdom: Animalia
- Phylum: Arthropoda
- Class: Insecta
- Order: Lepidoptera
- Family: Pyralidae
- Genus: Cacotherapia
- Species: C. leucocope

Binomial name
- Cacotherapia leucocope (Dyar, 1917)

Synonyms
- Macrotheca leucocope Dyar, 1917

= Cacotherapia leucocope =

Species of moth

Cacotherapia leucocope is a species of snout moth in the genus Cacotherapia. It was described by Harrison Gray Dyar Jr. in 1917 and is known from the US state of Colorado.

The wingspan is about 18 mm.
