= Macropyralis =

Scientific classification
- Kingdom: Animalia
- Phylum: Arthropoda
- Class: Insecta
- Order: Lepidoptera
- Family: Pyralidae
- Subfamily: Pyralinae
- Genus: Macropyralis; Amsel, 1953
- Species: M. gigantalis

Binomial name
- Macropyralis gigantalis Amsel, 1953

Genus of moths

Macropyralis is a monotypic snout moth genus described by Hans Georg Amsel in 1953. Its single species, Macropyralis gigantalis, described by the same author, is found in Mauritania.
