= Imerina (moth) =

Scientific classification
- Kingdom: Animalia
- Phylum: Arthropoda
- Class: Insecta
- Order: Lepidoptera
- Family: Pyralidae
- Subfamily: Pyralinae
- Genus: Imerina; Ragonot, 1891

Genus of moths

Imerina is a genus of snout moths described by Émile Louis Ragonot in 1891.

== Species ==
- Imerina mabillalis Ragonot, 1891
- Imerina saramitoi Guillermet in Viette & Guillermet, 1996
