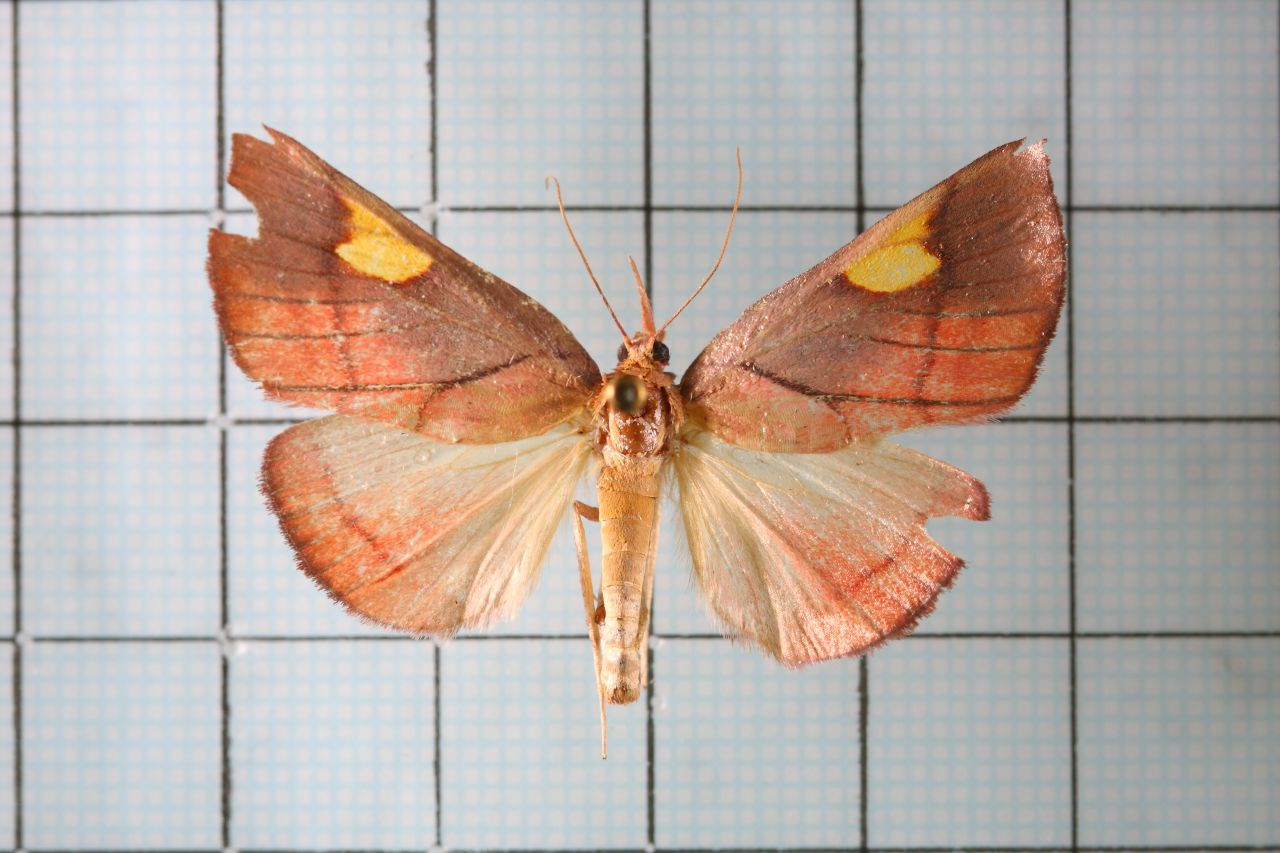
- Orybina flaviplaga

Scientific classification
- Kingdom: Animalia
- Phylum: Arthropoda
- Class: Insecta
- Order: Lepidoptera
- Family: Pyralidae
- Subfamily: Pyralinae
- Genus: Orybina; Snellen, 1895

Synonyms
- Oryba Walker, 1863

= Orybina =

Genus of moths

Orybina is a genus of moths of the family Pyralidae. It was described by Snellen in 1895.

== Species ==
- Orybina flaviplaga Walker, 1863
- Orybina plangonalis (Walker, 1859)
