= Arsenaria caidalis =

Scientific classification
- Kingdom: Animalia
- Phylum: Arthropoda
- Class: Insecta
- Order: Lepidoptera
- Family: Pyralidae
- Genus: Arsenaria
- Species: A. caidalis

Binomial name
- Arsenaria caidalis (Hampson, 1900)

Synonyms
- Constantia caidalis Hampson, 1900; Constantia caidalis var. strobilacalis Chrétien, 1910

Species of moth

Arsenaria caidalis is a species of snout moth in the genus Arsenaria. It was described by George Hampson in 1900 and is found in Algeria, Morocco, Tunisia and the United Arab Emirates.

The larvae feed on Halocnemum strobilaceum.
