= Cacotherapia poecilostigma =

Scientific classification
- Kingdom: Animalia
- Phylum: Arthropoda
- Class: Insecta
- Order: Lepidoptera
- Family: Pyralidae
- Genus: Cacotherapia
- Species: C. poecilostigma

Binomial name
- Cacotherapia poecilostigma (Dyar, 1914)

Synonyms
- Macrotheca poecilostigma Dyar, 1914

Species of moth

Cacotherapia poecilostigma is a species of snout moth in the genus Cacotherapia. It was described by Harrison Gray Dyar Jr. in 1914, and is known from Panama.
