= Meca astralis =

Scientific classification
- Kingdom: Animalia
- Phylum: Arthropoda
- Clade: Pancrustacea
- Class: Insecta
- Order: Lepidoptera
- Family: Pyralidae
- Subfamily: Pyralinae
- Genus: Meca; Karsch, 1900
- Species: M. astralis

Binomial name
- Meca astralis Karsch, 1900

Species of moth

Meca astralis is a species of snout moth, and the only species in the genus Meca. Both the species and genus were described by Ferdinand Karsch in 1900. It is known from southern Cameroon.
