= Epacternis porphyraspis =

Scientific classification
- Kingdom: Animalia
- Phylum: Arthropoda
- Class: Insecta
- Order: Lepidoptera
- Family: Pyralidae
- Genus: Epacternis
- Species: E. porphyraspis

Binomial name
- Epacternis porphyraspis Meyrick, 1933

Species of moth

Epacternis porphyraspis is a species of snout moth in the genus Epacternis. It was described by Edward Meyrick in 1933. It is found in the Democratic Republic of the Congo.
