= Omphalomia accersita =

Scientific classification
- Kingdom: Animalia
- Phylum: Arthropoda
- Class: Insecta
- Order: Lepidoptera
- Family: Pyralidae
- Genus: Omphalomia
- Species: O. accersita

Binomial name
- Omphalomia accersita C. Swinhoe, 1894

Species of moth

Omphalomia accersita is a species of snout moth. It was described by Charles Swinhoe in 1894. It is found in India.
