= Lophocera =

Scientific classification
- Kingdom: Animalia
- Phylum: Arthropoda
- Class: Insecta
- Order: Lepidoptera
- Family: Pyralidae
- Subfamily: Pyralinae
- Genus: Lophocera; Kenrick, 1917

Genus of moths

Lophocera is a genus of snout moths described by George Hamilton Kenrick in 1917.

Palpi are upturned, the third joint well developed and acute, proboscis present; antennae pectinated (comb like) in the male, with a bunch in the middle.

The species of this genus are all known only from Madagascar. The forewings are brown blackish with a yellow spot in the cell. Hindwing orange yellow, bordered blackish.

== Species ==
- Lophocera flavifusalis Marion & Viette, 1956
- Lophocera flavipuncta Kenrick, 1917
- Lophocera vadonalis Marion & Viette, 1956
