= Lorymana =

Scientific classification
- Kingdom: Animalia
- Phylum: Arthropoda
- Class: Insecta
- Order: Lepidoptera
- Family: Pyralidae
- Subfamily: Pyralinae
- Genus: Lorymana; Strand, 1915
- Species: L. noctuiformis

Binomial name
- Lorymana noctuiformis Strand, 1915

Genus of moths

Lorymana is a monotypic snout moth genus described by Embrik Strand in 1915. Its single species, Lorymana noctuiformis, was described in the same article and is found in Sudan.
