= Omphalobasella =

Scientific classification
- Kingdom: Animalia
- Phylum: Arthropoda
- Clade: Pancrustacea
- Class: Insecta
- Order: Lepidoptera
- Family: Pyralidae
- Subfamily: Pyralinae
- Genus: Omphalobasella; Strand, 1915
- Species: O. inconspicua

Binomial name
- Omphalobasella inconspicua Strand, 1915

Genus of moths

Omphalobasella is a monotypic snout moth genus described by Embrik Strand in 1915. Its only species, Omphalobasella inconspicua, described by the same author in the same year, is found in Cameroon.
