= Antisindris =

Scientific classification
- Kingdom: Animalia
- Phylum: Arthropoda
- Class: Insecta
- Order: Lepidoptera
- Family: Pyralidae
- Subfamily: Pyralinae
- Genus: Antisindris; Marion, 1955
- Species: A. bipunctalis

Binomial name
- Antisindris bipunctalis Marion, 1955

Genus of moths

Antisindris is a monotypic snout moth genus. Its only species, Antisindris bipunctalis, is found on Madagascar. Both the genus and species were first described by Hubert Marion in 1955.
