= Mimicia =

Scientific classification
- Kingdom: Animalia
- Phylum: Arthropoda
- Class: Insecta
- Order: Lepidoptera
- Family: Pyralidae
- Subfamily: Pyralinae
- Genus: Mimicia; Caradja, 1925
- Species: M. pseudolibatrix

Binomial name
- Mimicia pseudolibatrix Caradja, 1925

Synonyms
- Genus: Mellia Caradja & Meyrick, 1934; Meltalia Strand, 1935; Species: Hyboloma pseudolibatrix Caradja 1925

Genus of moths

Mimicia is a monotypic snout moth genus described by Aristide Caradja in 1925. Its only species, Mimicia pseudolibatrix, described by the same author in the same year, is found in China.
