= Diloxia belohalis =

Scientific classification
- Kingdom: Animalia
- Phylum: Arthropoda
- Class: Insecta
- Order: Lepidoptera
- Family: Pyralidae
- Genus: Diloxia
- Species: D. belohalis

Binomial name
- Diloxia belohalis Marion & Viette, 1956

Species of moth

Diloxia belohalis is a species of snout moth in the genus Diloxia. It was described by Hubert Marion and Pierre Viette in 1956 and is known from Beloha, Madagascar, from which its specific epithet is derived.
