= Diloxia =

Scientific classification
- Kingdom: Animalia
- Phylum: Arthropoda
- Class: Insecta
- Order: Lepidoptera
- Family: Pyralidae
- Subfamily: Pyralinae
- Genus: Diloxia; Hampson, 1896

Type species
- Diloxia fimbriata Hampson, 1896

Genus of moths

Diloxia is a genus of snout moths (family Pyralidae). It was described by George Hampson in 1896, and is known from Madagascar and India.

== Species ==
- Diloxia belohalis Marion & Viette, 1956
- Diloxia euteles West, 1931
- Diloxia fimbriata Hampson, 1896
- Diloxia isocypha Meyrick 1938
