= Hypanchyla =

Scientific classification
- Kingdom: Animalia
- Phylum: Arthropoda
- Class: Insecta
- Order: Lepidoptera
- Family: Pyralidae
- Subfamily: Pyralinae
- Genus: Hypanchyla; Warren, 1891
- Species: H. maricalis

Binomial name
- Hypanchyla maricalis (Walker, 1859)

Synonyms
- Pyralis maricalis Walker, 1859; Pyralis lebonalis Walker, 1859

Genus of moths

Hypanchyla is a monotypic snout moth genus described by William Warren in 1891. Its single species, Hypanchyla maricalis, described by Francis Walker in 1859, is known from Borneo.
