= Pyralosis terminalis =

Scientific classification
- Domain: Eukaryota
- Kingdom: Animalia
- Phylum: Arthropoda
- Class: Insecta
- Order: Lepidoptera
- Family: Pyralidae
- Genus: Pyralosis
- Species: P. terminalis

Binomial name
- Pyralosis terminalis (Rothschild, 1915)

Synonyms
- Ulotricha terminalis Rothschild, 1915

Species of moth

Pyralosis terminalis is a species of snout moth in the genus Pyralosis. It was described by Walter Rothschild in 1915. It is found in Algeria.
