= Embryoglossa =

Scientific classification
- Kingdom: Animalia
- Phylum: Arthropoda
- Class: Insecta
- Order: Lepidoptera
- Family: Pyralidae
- Subfamily: Pyralinae
- Genus: Embryoglossa; Warren, 1896

Synonyms
- Taeniaphora Kenrick, 1917

Genus of moths

Embryoglossa is a genus of snout moths. It was described by Warren in 1896, and is known from Nigeria, Madagascar, and India.

== Species ==
- Embryoglossa aethiopicalis Gaede, 1916
- Embryoglossa bipuncta Hampson, 1903
- Embryoglossa submarginata (Kenrick, 1917)
- Embryoglossa variegata Warren, 1896
