= Embryoglossa aethiopicalis =

Scientific classification
- Kingdom: Animalia
- Phylum: Arthropoda
- Class: Insecta
- Order: Lepidoptera
- Family: Pyralidae
- Genus: Embryoglossa
- Species: E. aethiopicalis

Binomial name
- Embryoglossa aethiopicalis Gaede, 1916

Species of moth

Embryoglossa aethiopicalis is a species of snout moth in the genus Embryoglossa. It was described by Max Gaede in 1916 and is known from Nigeria.
