= Epacternis mabokealis =

Scientific classification
- Kingdom: Animalia
- Phylum: Arthropoda
- Class: Insecta
- Order: Lepidoptera
- Family: Pyralidae
- Genus: Epacternis
- Species: E. mabokealis

Binomial name
- Epacternis mabokealis Leraut, 2011

Species of moth

Epacternis mabokealis is a species of snout moth in the genus Epacternis. It was described by Patrice J.A. Leraut in 2011 and is found in the Central African Republic.
