= Acteniopsis kurdistanella =

Scientific classification
- Kingdom: Animalia
- Phylum: Arthropoda
- Clade: Pancrustacea
- Class: Insecta
- Order: Lepidoptera
- Family: Pyralidae
- Genus: Acteniopsis
- Species: A. kurdistanella

Binomial name
- Acteniopsis kurdistanella Amsel, 1959

Species of moth

Acteniopsis kurdistanella is a species of snout moth in the genus Acteniopsis. It was described by Hans Georg Amsel in 1959. It is found in Iraq and Iran.

== Subspecies ==
- Acteniopsis kurdistanella kurdistanella (Iraq)
- Acteniopsis kurdistanella unicolorella Amsel, 1961 (Iran)
