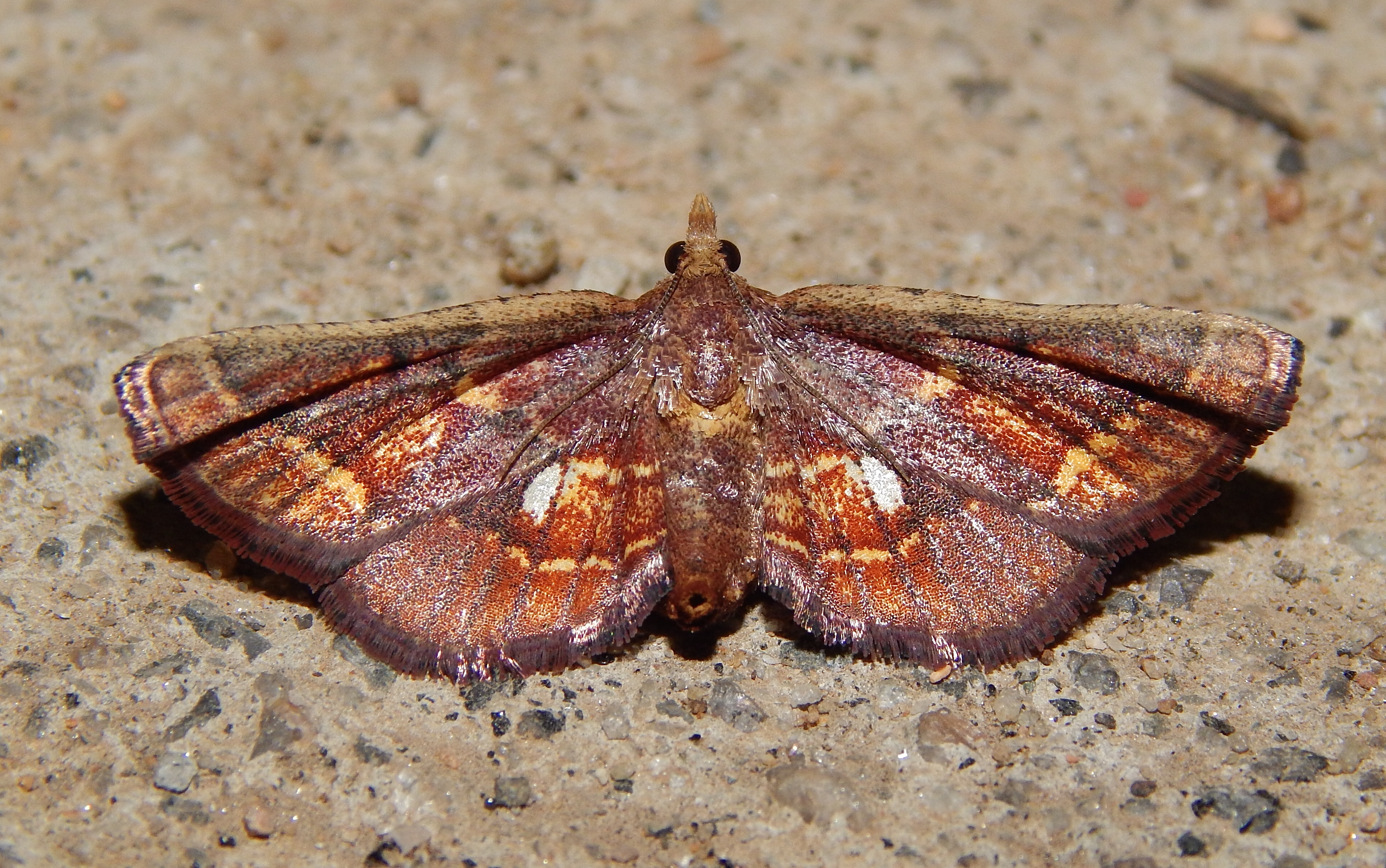
- Z. torridalis in the Western Ghats, India

Scientific classification
- Domain: Eukaryota
- Kingdom: Animalia
- Phylum: Arthropoda
- Class: Insecta
- Order: Lepidoptera
- Family: Pyralidae
- Genus: Zitha
- Species: Z. torridalis

Binomial name
- Zitha torridalis (Lederer, 1863)

Synonyms
- Asopia torridalis Lederer, 1863; Tamraca torridalis; Vanina incerta Walker, 1865; Coenodomus brunneus Suzuki, 1915

= Zitha torridalis =

Species of moth

Zitha torridalis is a species of snout moth. It is found in Korea, Japan, China, India, Sri Lanka, Myanmar and Java.

The wingspan is 17–23 mm. Adults are on wing from July to August.
