= Arsenaria dattinii =

Scientific classification
- Domain: Eukaryota
- Kingdom: Animalia
- Phylum: Arthropoda
- Class: Insecta
- Order: Lepidoptera
- Family: Pyralidae
- Genus: Arsenaria
- Species: A. dattinii

Binomial name
- Arsenaria dattinii (Ragonot, 1887)

Synonyms
- Libya dattinii Ragonot, 1887; Constantia rara Amsel, 1935

Species of moth

Arsenaria dattinii is a species of snout moth in the genus Arsenaria. It was described by Ragonot in 1887, and is known from Tunisia and Palestine.
