= Arsenaria kebilialis =

Scientific classification
- Kingdom: Animalia
- Phylum: Arthropoda
- Class: Insecta
- Order: Lepidoptera
- Family: Pyralidae
- Genus: Arsenaria
- Species: A. kebilialis

Binomial name
- Arsenaria kebilialis (D. Lucas, 1907)

Synonyms
- Constantia kebilialis D. Lucas, 1907; Arsenaria kebilialis rungsalis Leraut, 2004

Species of moth

Arsenaria kebilialis is a species of snout moth in the genus Arsenaria. It was described by Daniel Lucas in 1907, and is known from Tunisia and Morocco.
