= Marionana =

Scientific classification
- Kingdom: Animalia
- Phylum: Arthropoda
- Class: Insecta
- Order: Lepidoptera
- Family: Pyralidae
- Subfamily: Pyralinae
- Genus: Marionana; Viette, 1953

Genus of moths

Marionana is a genus of snout moths described by Pierre Viette in 1953.

== Species ==
- Marionana paulianalis Viette, 1953

== Former species ==
- Marionana vinolentalis Viette, 1960
