= Arsenaria (moth) =

Scientific classification
- Domain: Eukaryota
- Kingdom: Animalia
- Phylum: Arthropoda
- Class: Insecta
- Order: Lepidoptera
- Family: Pyralidae
- Tribe: Hypotiini
- Genus: Arsenaria; Ragonot, 1891

Synonyms
- Libya Ragonot, 1887

Genus of moths

Arsenaria is a genus of snout moths. It was described by Ragonot in 1891, and is found in Algeria, Tunisia, Iran, Syria and Iraq.

== Species ==
- Arsenaria caidalis (Hampson, 1900)
- Arsenaria dattinii (Ragonot, 1887)
- Arsenaria indistinctalis (Amsel, 1949)
- Arsenaria kebilialis (D. Lucas, 1907)
- Arsenaria sanctalis (Hampson, 1900)
- Arsenaria strictalis (Amsel, 1949)
- Arsenaria vesceritalis (Chrétien, 1913)
- Arsenaria wiltshirei (Amsel, 1949)
