= Neobostra =

Scientific classification
- Kingdom: Animalia
- Phylum: Arthropoda
- Class: Insecta
- Order: Lepidoptera
- Family: Pyralidae
- Subfamily: Pyralinae
- Genus: Neobostra; Hampson, 1906
- Species: N. ferruginealis

Binomial name
- Neobostra ferruginealis Hampson, 1906

Genus of moths

Neobostra, is a monotypic snout moth genus described by George Hampson in 1906. Its only species, Neobostra ferruginealis, described by the same author in the same year, is found in South Africa.
