= Discordia (moth) =

Scientific classification
- Kingdom: Animalia
- Phylum: Arthropoda
- Class: Insecta
- Order: Lepidoptera
- Family: Pyralidae
- Subfamily: Pyralinae
- Genus: Discordia; Swinhoe, 1885

Genus of moths

Discordia is a genus of snout moths. It was described by Swinhoe, in 1885, and is known from Madagascar.

== Species ==
- Discordia evulsa Swinhoe, 1885
- Discordia sakarahalis Marion & Viette, 1956
- Discordia seyrigalis Marion & Viette, 1956
