= Lophocera flavipuncta =

Scientific classification
- Kingdom: Animalia
- Phylum: Arthropoda
- Class: Insecta
- Order: Lepidoptera
- Family: Pyralidae
- Genus: Lophocera
- Species: L. flavipuncta

Binomial name
- Lophocera flavipuncta Kenrick, 1917

Species of moth

Lophocera flavipuncta is a species of snout moth in the genus Lophocera. It was described by George Hamilton Kenrick in 1917 and is known from Madagascar.

This species has a wingspan of 30–34 mm.
