= Adulis distrigalis =

Scientific classification
- Kingdom: Animalia
- Phylum: Arthropoda
- Class: Insecta
- Order: Lepidoptera
- Family: Pyralidae
- Genus: Adulis
- Species: A. distrigalis

Binomial name
- Adulis distrigalis Ragonot, 1891

Species of moth

Adulis distrigalis is a species of snout moth in the genus Adulis. It was described by Ragonot in 1891. It is found in Madagascar.
