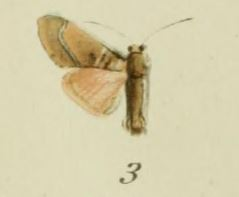

Scientific classification
- Kingdom: Animalia
- Phylum: Arthropoda
- Clade: Pancrustacea
- Class: Insecta
- Order: Lepidoptera
- Family: Pyralidae
- Genus: Sacada
- Species: S. acutipennis

Binomial name
- Sacada acutipennis Strand, 1915

Synonyms
- Aiteta acutipennis Strand, 1915

= Sacada acutipennis =

Species of moth

Sacada acutipennis is a species of moth in the family Pyralidae. It was described by Embrik Strand in 1915.

== Distribution ==
It is found in Cameroon.
