= Heterocrasa =

Scientific classification
- Kingdom: Animalia
- Phylum: Arthropoda
- Class: Insecta
- Order: Lepidoptera
- Family: Pyralidae
- Subfamily: Pyralinae
- Genus: Heterocrasa; Warren, 1896
- Species: H. expansalis

Binomial name
- Heterocrasa expansalis Warren, 1896

Genus of moths

Heterocrasa is a monotypic snout moth genus described by William Warren in 1896. Its only species, Heterocrasa expansalis, described by the same author in the same year, is found in India.
