= Latagognoma =

Scientific classification
- Kingdom: Animalia
- Phylum: Arthropoda
- Clade: Pancrustacea
- Class: Insecta
- Order: Lepidoptera
- Family: Pyralidae
- Subfamily: Pyralinae
- Genus: Latagognoma; Tams, 1935
- Species: L. dacryodes

Binomial name
- Latagognoma dacryodes Tams, 1935

Genus of moths

Latagognoma is a genus of snout moths. It was described by Tams in 1935, and contains the species Latagognoma dacryodes. It is known from Samoa.
