= Hyboloma =

Scientific classification
- Kingdom: Animalia
- Phylum: Arthropoda
- Clade: Pancrustacea
- Class: Insecta
- Order: Lepidoptera
- Family: Pyralidae
- Subfamily: Pyralinae
- Genus: Hyboloma; Ragonot 1891
- Species: H. nummosalis

Binomial name
- Hyboloma nummosalis Ragonot, 1891

Genus of moths

Hyboloma is a monotypic snout moth genus described by Émile Louis Ragonot in 1891. Its only species, Hyboloma nummosalis, described in the same article, is found on Borneo.
