= Haplosindris =

Scientific classification
- Kingdom: Animalia
- Phylum: Arthropoda
- Class: Insecta
- Order: Lepidoptera
- Family: Pyralidae
- Subfamily: Pyralinae
- Genus: Haplosindris; Viette, 1953
- Species: H. leucotriangula

Binomial name
- Haplosindris leucotriangula (Mabille, 1900)

Synonyms
- Sindris leucotriangula Mabille, 1900

Genus of moths

Haplosindris is a monotypic snout moth genus described by Pierre Viette in 1953. Its single species, Haplosindris leucotriangula, described by Paul Mabille in 1900, is known from Madagascar.
