= Ethelontides =

Scientific classification
- Kingdom: Animalia
- Phylum: Arthropoda
- Class: Insecta
- Order: Lepidoptera
- Family: Pyralidae
- Subfamily: Pyralinae
- Genus: Ethelontides; Meyrick, 1934
- Species: E. biunicornis

Binomial name
- Ethelontides biunicornis Meyrick, 1934

Genus of moths

Ethelontides is a monotypic snout moth genus. Its only species, Ethelontides biunicornis, is found on Java in Indonesia. Both the genus and species were first described by Edward Meyrick in 1934.
