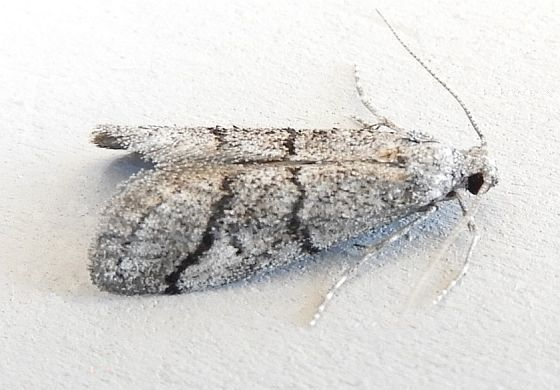

Scientific classification
- Kingdom: Animalia
- Phylum: Arthropoda
- Class: Insecta
- Order: Lepidoptera
- Family: Pyralidae
- Genus: Cacotherapia
- Species: C. bilinealis

Binomial name
- Cacotherapia bilinealis (Barnes & McDunnough, 1918)

Synonyms
- Macrotheca bilinealis Barnes & McDunnough, 1918

= Cacotherapia bilinealis =

Species of moth

Cacotherapia bilinealis is a species of snout moth in the genus Cacotherapia. It was described by William Barnes and James Halliday McDunnough in 1918 and is known from the US state of Arizona.
