= Epacternis alluaudalis =

Scientific classification
- Kingdom: Animalia
- Phylum: Arthropoda
- Clade: Pancrustacea
- Class: Insecta
- Order: Lepidoptera
- Family: Pyralidae
- Genus: Epacternis
- Species: E. alluaudalis

Binomial name
- Epacternis alluaudalis Leraut, 2011

Species of moth

Epacternis alluaudalis is a species of snout moth in the genus Epacternis. It was described by Patrice J.A. Leraut in 2011 and is known to be located in Kenya.
