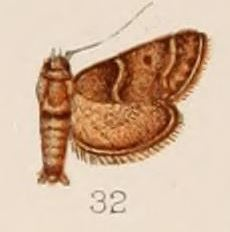
- Triphassa marcrarthralis

Scientific classification
- Kingdom: Animalia
- Phylum: Arthropoda
- Clade: Pancrustacea
- Class: Insecta
- Order: Lepidoptera
- Family: Pyralidae
- Subfamily: Pyralinae
- Genus: Triphassa; Hübner, 1818

Type species
- Triphassa stalachtis Hübner, 1818

= Triphassa =

Genus of moths

Triphassa is a genus of moths of the family Pyralidae described by Jacob Hübner in 1818.

== Species ==
- Triphassa anaemialis Hampson, 1906 (from Nigeria)
- Triphassa argentea Mey, 2011 (from South Africa)
- Triphassa bilineata Moore, 1887 from Sri Lanka
- Triphassa confusa Ghesquière, 1942 (from Congo)
- Triphassa costipuncta de Joannis, 1930
- Triphassa exustalis (Guenée, 1854) (from Congo and South Africa)
- Triphassa flammealis Hampson, 1906 (from Ghana)
- Triphassa flavifrons (Warren, 1892) (from Ghana)
- Triphassa imbutalis Walker, [1866]
- Triphassa luteicilialis Hampson, 1896
- Triphassa marcrarthralis Hampson, 1908 (from India)
- Triphassa marshalli (Hampson, 1906) (from South Africa)
- Triphassa maynei Ghesquière, 1942 (from Congo)
- Triphassa metaxantha Hampson, 1896
- Triphassa ochrealis Hampson, 1893 (from South Africa)
- Triphassa philerastis Meyrick, 1934 (from Congo)
- Triphassa rufinalis (Felder & Rogenhofer, 1875) (from South Africa)
- Triphassa senior Meyrick, 1936 (from Congo)
- Triphassa smaragdina Ghesquière, 1942 (from Congo)
- Triphassa stalachtis Hübner, 1818 (from South Africa and Lesotho)
- Triphassa unilinealis (Warren, 1896)
- Triphassa victorialis Karsch, 1900 (from Cameroon and Congo)
- Triphassa vulsalis Walker, 1859
- Triphassa xylinalis Swinhoe, 1886
- Triphassa zeuxoalis Walker, 1863
- Triphassa zonalis Hampson, 1899
