= Benderia =

Scientific classification
- Kingdom: Animalia
- Phylum: Arthropoda
- Class: Insecta
- Order: Lepidoptera
- Family: Pyralidae
- Subfamily: Pyralinae
- Genus: Benderia; Amsel, 1949
- Species: B. talhouki

Binomial name
- Benderia talhouki Amsel, 1949

Genus of moths

Benderia is a monotypic snout moth genus described by Hans Georg Amsel in 1949. Its single species, Benderia talhouki, was described by the same author. It is found in Iran.
