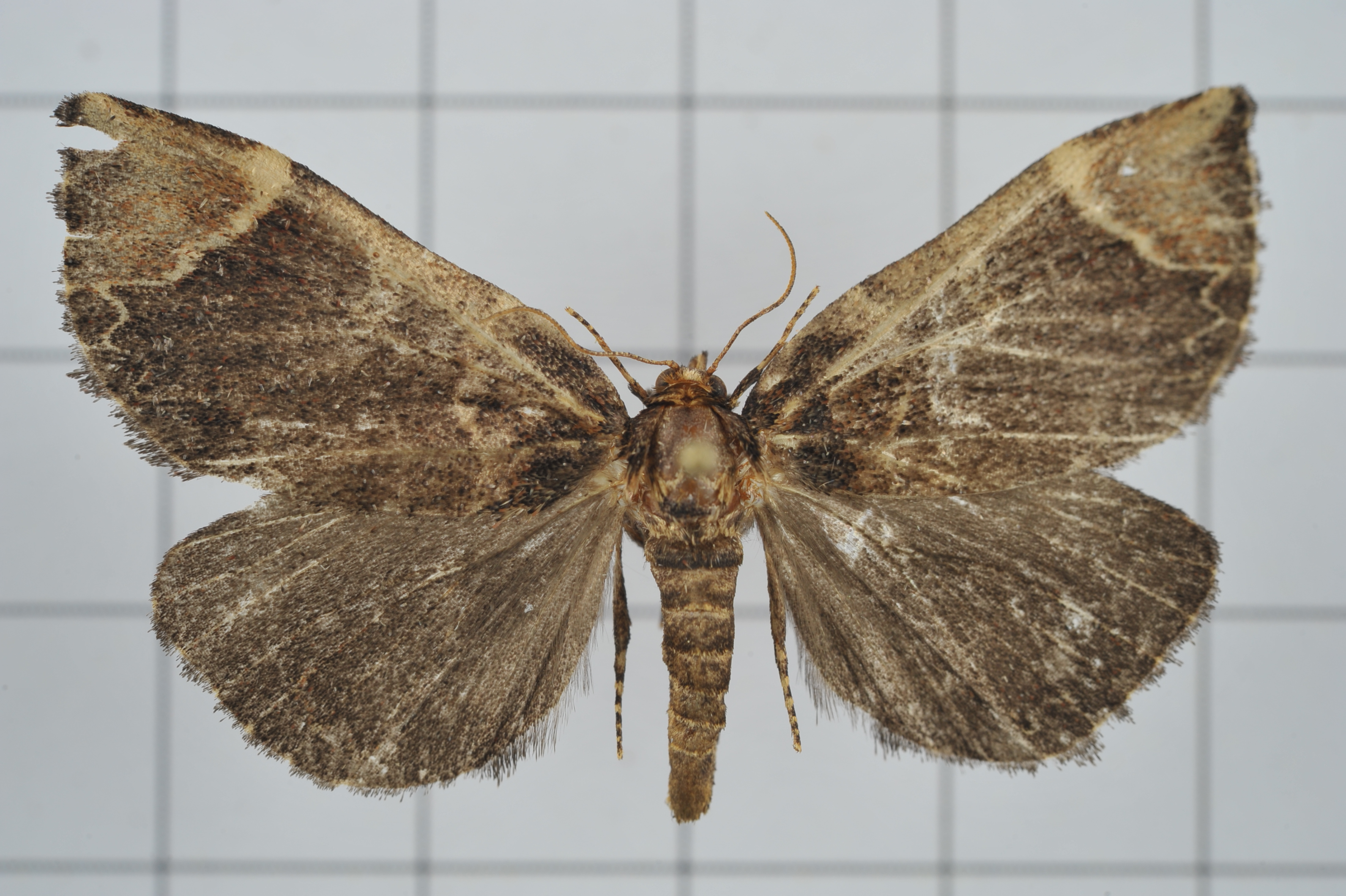

Scientific classification
- Kingdom: Animalia
- Phylum: Arthropoda
- Class: Insecta
- Order: Lepidoptera
- Family: Pyralidae
- Genus: Omphalomia
- Species: O. hirta

Binomial name
- Omphalomia hirta South, 1901

= Omphalomia hirta =

Species of moth

Omphalomia hirta is a species of snout moth. It was described by South in 1901. It is found in China.
