= Embryoglossa bipuncta =

Scientific classification
- Kingdom: Animalia
- Phylum: Arthropoda
- Class: Insecta
- Order: Lepidoptera
- Family: Pyralidae
- Genus: Embryoglossa
- Species: E. bipuncta

Binomial name
- Embryoglossa bipuncta Hampson, 1903

Species of moth

Embryoglossa bipuncta is a species of snout moth in the genus Embryoglossa. It was described by George Hampson in 1903 and is known from India.
