= Triphassa bilineata =

Scientific classification
- Domain: Eukaryota
- Kingdom: Animalia
- Phylum: Arthropoda
- Class: Insecta
- Order: Lepidoptera
- Family: Pyralidae
- Genus: Triphassa
- Species: T. bilineata

Binomial name
- Triphassa bilineata Moore, 1887

Species of moth

Triphassa bilineata is a moth of the family Pyralidae first described by Frederic Moore in 1887. It was first found in Sri Lanka.
