= Arsenaria sanctalis =

Scientific classification
- Kingdom: Animalia
- Phylum: Arthropoda
- Class: Insecta
- Order: Lepidoptera
- Family: Pyralidae
- Genus: Arsenaria
- Species: A. sanctalis

Binomial name
- Arsenaria sanctalis (Hampson, 1900)

Synonyms
- Constantia sanctalis Hampson, 1900

Species of moth

Arsenaria sanctalis is a species of snout moth in the genus Arsenaria. It was described by George Hampson in 1900 and is known from Syria.
