= Zitha laminalis =

Scientific classification
- Kingdom: Animalia
- Phylum: Arthropoda
- Class: Insecta
- Order: Lepidoptera
- Family: Pyralidae
- Genus: Zitha
- Species: Z. laminalis

Binomial name
- Zitha laminalis (Guenée, 1854)

Synonyms
- Oryctocera rufiflualis Walker, 1865; Aglossa laminalis

Species of moth

Zitha laminalis is a species of snout moth in the genus Zitha. It was described by Achille Guenée in 1854. It is found in South Africa.
