= Melanalis =

Scientific classification
- Kingdom: Animalia
- Phylum: Arthropoda
- Class: Insecta
- Order: Lepidoptera
- Family: Pyralidae
- Subfamily: Pyralinae
- Genus: Melanalis; Hampson, 1906
- Species: M. perfusca

Binomial name
- Melanalis perfusca Hampson, 1906

Genus of moths

Melanalis, is a monotypic snout moth genus described by George Hampson in 1906. Its only species, Melanalis perfusca, described by the same author in the same year, is found in South Africa.
