= Falsoterinaea =

Scientific classification
- Domain: Eukaryota
- Kingdom: Animalia
- Phylum: Arthropoda
- Class: Insecta
- Order: Coleoptera
- Suborder: Polyphaga
- Infraorder: Cucujiformia
- Family: Cerambycidae
- Subfamily: Lamiinae
- Genus: Falsoterinaea (Matsushita, 1937)

species
- Falsoterinaea fuscorufa (Matsushita, 1937); Falsoterinaea pakistana (Breuning, 1975)

Synonyms
- Hirayamaia(Matsushita, 1937)

Genus of beetles

Falsoterinaea is a genus of longhorn beetles of the subfamily Lamiinae, containing the following species:

- Falsoterinaea fuscorufa (Matsushita, 1937)
- Falsoterinaea pakistana Breuning, 1975
