= Orybina plangonalis =

Scientific classification
- Kingdom: Animalia
- Phylum: Arthropoda
- Class: Insecta
- Order: Lepidoptera
- Family: Pyralidae
- Genus: Orybina
- Species: O. plangonalis

Binomial name
- Orybina plangonalis (Walker, 1859)

Synonyms
- Scopula plangonalis Walker, 1859

Species of moth

Orybina plangonalis is a moth of the family Pyralidae. It was described by Francis Walker in 1859 and is known from northern India and Taiwan.
