= Acteniopsis =

Scientific classification
- Kingdom: Animalia
- Phylum: Arthropoda
- Clade: Pancrustacea
- Class: Insecta
- Order: Lepidoptera
- Family: Pyralidae
- Subfamily: Pyralinae
- Genus: Acteniopsis; Amsel, 1959

Genus of insects

Acteniopsis is a genus of snout moths in the subfamily Pyralinae. It was described by Hans Georg Amsel in 1959 and is known from the United Arab Emirates.

== Species ==
- Acteniopsis kurdistanella Amsel, 1959
- Acteniopsis gambronensis Alipanah & Asselbergs, 2018

== Former species ==
- Acteniopsis robustus, now Stemmatophora robustus (Asselbergs, 2010)
