= Discordia seyrigalis =

Scientific classification
- Kingdom: Animalia
- Phylum: Arthropoda
- Class: Insecta
- Order: Lepidoptera
- Family: Pyralidae
- Genus: Discordia
- Species: D. seyrigalis

Binomial name
- Discordia seyrigalis Marion & Viette, 1956

Species of moth

Discordia seyrigalis is a species of snout moth in the genus Discordia. It was described by Hubert Marion and Pierre Viette in 1956 and is known from Madagascar.
