= Diboma =

Scientific classification
- Kingdom: Animalia
- Phylum: Arthropoda
- Class: Insecta
- Order: Lepidoptera
- Family: Pyralidae
- Genus: Diboma; Walker, 1863
- Species: D. abscissalis

Binomial name
- Diboma abscissalis Walker, 1863

Genus of moths

Diboma is a monotypic moth genus in the family Pyralidae. Its only species, Diboma abscissalis, is found in Borneo. Both the genus and the species were first described by Francis Walker in 1863.

The Global Lepidoptera Names Index gives this name as a synonym of Lamacha Walker, 1863.
