= Discordia evulsa =

Scientific classification
- Kingdom: Animalia
- Phylum: Arthropoda
- Class: Insecta
- Order: Lepidoptera
- Family: Pyralidae
- Genus: Discordia
- Species: D. evulsa

Binomial name
- Discordia evulsa C. Swinhoe, 1885

Species of moth

Discordia evulsa is a species of snout moth in the genus Discordia. It was described by Charles Swinhoe in 1885 and is found in India.
