= Pyralosis polycyclophora =

Scientific classification
- Kingdom: Animalia
- Phylum: Arthropoda
- Class: Insecta
- Order: Lepidoptera
- Family: Pyralidae
- Genus: Pyralosis
- Species: P. polycyclophora

Binomial name
- Pyralosis polycyclophora (Hampson, 1916)

Synonyms
- Hypsopygia polycyclophora Hampson, 1916

Species of moth

Pyralosis polycyclophora is a species of snout moth in the genus Pyralosis. It was described by George Hampson in 1916. It is found in Malawi, Namibia and South Africa.
