= Maschalandra =

Scientific classification
- Kingdom: Animalia
- Phylum: Arthropoda
- Class: Insecta
- Order: Lepidoptera
- Family: Pyralidae
- Subfamily: Pyralinae
- Genus: Maschalandra; Meyrick, 1937
- Species: M. euphema

Binomial name
- Maschalandra euphema Meyrick, 1937

Genus of moths

Maschalandra is a monotypic snout moth genus described by Edward Meyrick in 1937. Its only species, Maschalandra euphema, described in the same publication, is known from Democratic Republic of the Congo (including Lubumbashi, the type location).
