= Nhoabe =

Scientific classification
- Kingdom: Animalia
- Phylum: Arthropoda
- Class: Insecta
- Order: Lepidoptera
- Family: Pyralidae
- Subfamily: Pyralinae
- Genus: Nhoabe; Viette, 1953

Synonyms
- Betsimisaraka Marion, 1955

Genus of moths

Nhoabe is a genus of snout moths described by Pierre Viette in 1953.

== Species ==
- Nhoabe marionalis P. Leraut, 2006
- Nhoabe millotalis Viette, 1953
- Nhoabe minetalis P. Leraut, 2006
- Nhoabe mocquerysalis Viette, 1953
- Nhoabe privatalis Viette, 1960
- Nhoabe ratovosonalis P. Leraut, 2006
- Nhoabe sambiranoalis P. Leraut, 2006
- Nhoabe viettealis (Marion, 1955)
