= Adulis (moth) =

Scientific classification
- Kingdom: Animalia
- Phylum: Arthropoda
- Clade: Pancrustacea
- Class: Insecta
- Order: Lepidoptera
- Family: Pyralidae
- Subfamily: Pyralinae
- Genus: Adulis; Ragonot, 1891

Genus of moths

Adulis is a genus of snout moths. It was described by Émile Louis Ragonot in 1891.

== Species ==
- Adulis serratalis Ragonot, 1891
- Adulis distrigalis Ragonot, 1891
