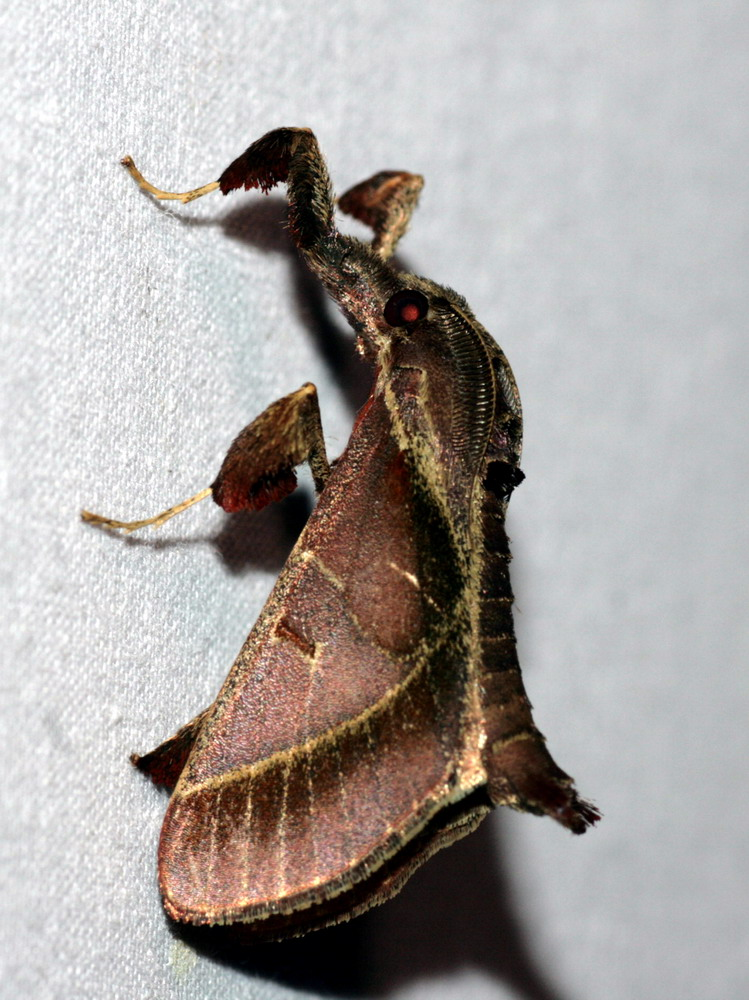

Scientific classification
- Kingdom: Animalia
- Phylum: Arthropoda
- Clade: Pancrustacea
- Class: Insecta
- Order: Lepidoptera
- Family: Pyralidae
- Genus: Sacada
- Species: S. approximans

Binomial name
- Sacada approximans (Leech, 1889)

Synonyms
- Datanoides approximans Leech, 1889; Sybrida approximans

= Sacada approximans =

Species of moth

Sacada approximans is a species of snout moth first described by John Henry Leech in 1889. It is found in Korea, Japan, China, Myanmar and India.

The wingspan is 25–35 mm. Adults are on wing from May to August.

The larvae feed on Quercus acutissima, Quercus acuta and Castanea crenata.
