= Grammiphlebia =

Scientific classification
- Kingdom: Animalia
- Phylum: Arthropoda
- Class: Insecta
- Order: Lepidoptera
- Family: Pyralidae
- Subfamily: Pyralinae
- Genus: Grammiphlebia; Hampson, 1906
- Species: G. obliqualis

Binomial name
- Grammiphlebia obliqualis Hampson, 1906

Synonyms
- Grammiphlebia striata Druce, 1902

Genus of moths

Grammiphlebia is a genus of snout moths. It was described by George Hampson in 1906 and contains the species Grammiphlebia obliqualis. It is found in eastern Africa.
