= Sacada fasciata =

Scientific classification
- Domain: Eukaryota
- Kingdom: Animalia
- Phylum: Arthropoda
- Class: Insecta
- Order: Lepidoptera
- Family: Pyralidae
- Genus: Sacada
- Species: S. fasciata

Binomial name
- Sacada fasciata (Butler, 1878)

Synonyms
- Datanoides fasciata Butler, 1878; Sacada fasciatus; Datanoides fasciatus; Sybrida fasciatus; Trebania fasciatus; Xestula miraculosa Snellen, 1885

Species of moth

Sacada fasciata is a species of snout moth. It is found in Korea, Japan, China, Myanmar, India and Russia.

The wingspan is 26–33 mm. Adults are on wing from May to September.

The larvae feed on Quercus acutissima, Quercus serrata, Quercus aliena and Lespedeza bicolor.
