= Arsenaria vesceritalis =

Scientific classification
- Domain: Eukaryota
- Kingdom: Animalia
- Phylum: Arthropoda
- Class: Insecta
- Order: Lepidoptera
- Family: Pyralidae
- Genus: Arsenaria
- Species: A. vesceritalis

Binomial name
- Arsenaria vesceritalis Chrétien, 1913

Species of moth

Arsenaria vesceritalis is a species of snout moth in the genus Arsenaria. It was described by Pierre Chrétien in 1913 and is known from Algeria.
