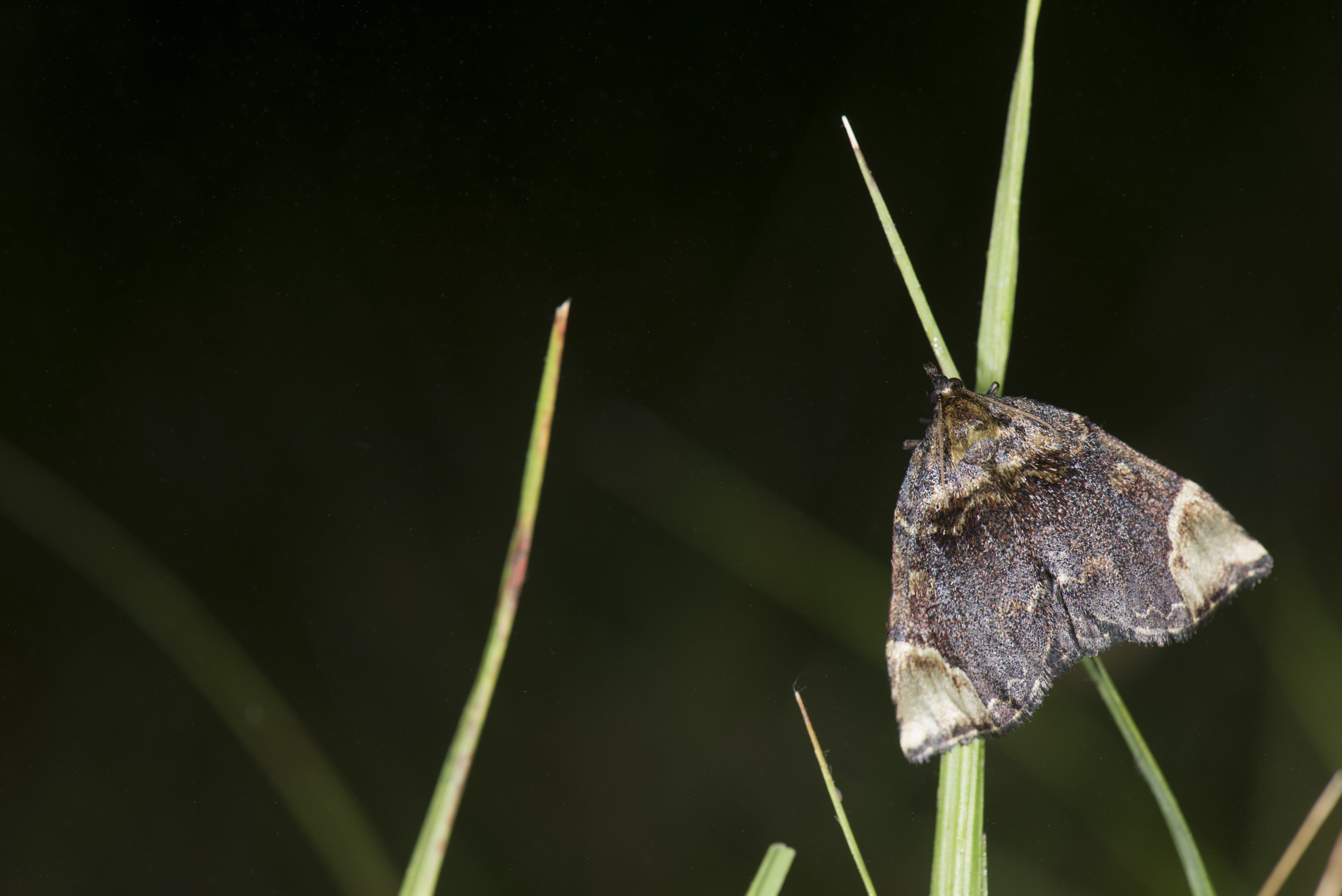

Scientific classification
- Kingdom: Animalia
- Phylum: Arthropoda
- Class: Insecta
- Order: Lepidoptera
- Family: Pyralidae
- Subfamily: Pyralinae
- Genus: Omphalomia; C. Swinhoe, 1894

= Omphalomia =

Genus of moths

Omphalomia is a genus of snout moths described by Charles Swinhoe in 1894.

== Species ==
- Omphalomia accersita C. Swinhoe, 1894
- Omphalomia hirta South, 1901
