= Ocydina =

Scientific classification
- Kingdom: Animalia
- Phylum: Arthropoda
- Class: Insecta
- Order: Lepidoptera
- Family: Pyralidae
- Subfamily: Pyralinae
- Genus: Ocydina; Meyrick, 1936
- Species: O. syngrammaula

Binomial name
- Ocydina syngrammaula Meyrick, 1936

Genus of moths

Ocydina is a monotypic snout moth genus described by Edward Meyrick in 1936. Its single species, Ocydina syngrammaula, described by the same author in the same year, is found in Congo.
