= Embryoglossa variegata =

Scientific classification
- Kingdom: Animalia
- Phylum: Arthropoda
- Class: Insecta
- Order: Lepidoptera
- Family: Pyralidae
- Genus: Embryoglossa
- Species: E. variegata

Binomial name
- Embryoglossa variegata Warren, 1896

Species of moth

Embryoglossa variegata is a species of snout moth in the genus Embryoglossa. It was described by Warren in 1896, and is known from northern India.
