= Hypotiini =

Scientific classification
- Domain: Eukaryota
- Kingdom: Animalia
- Phylum: Arthropoda
- Class: Insecta
- Order: Lepidoptera
- Family: Pyralidae
- Subfamily: Pyralinae
- Tribe: Hypotiini; Chapman, 1902

Tribe of moths

The Hypotiini are a tribe of moths of the family Pyralidae. It was described by Thomas Algernon Chapman in 1902

== Genera ==
- Arsenaria Ragonot, 1891
- Hypotia Zeller, 1847
