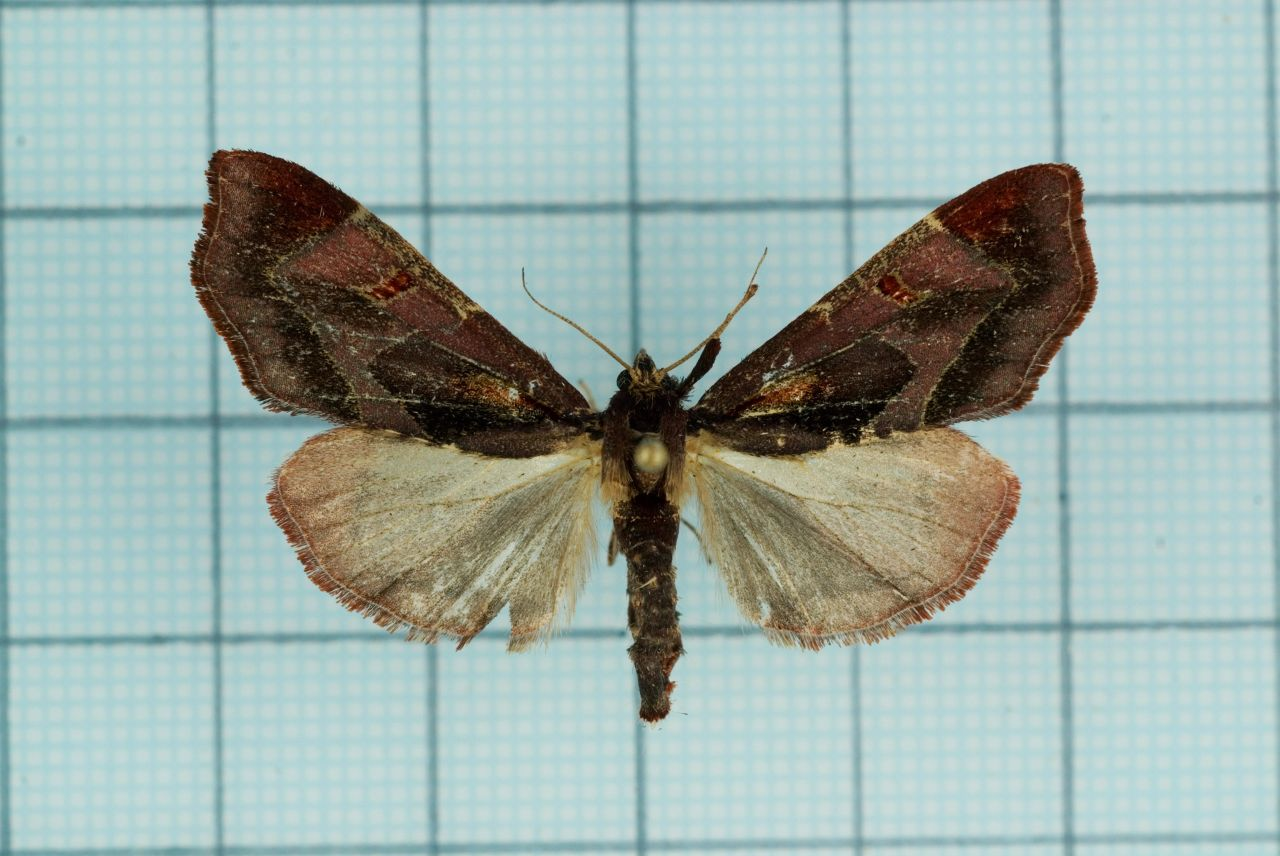
- Probably Sybrida inordinata

Scientific classification
- Kingdom: Animalia
- Phylum: Arthropoda
- Class: Insecta
- Order: Lepidoptera
- Family: Pyralidae
- Genus: Sybrida
- Species: S. inordinata

Binomial name
- Sybrida inordinata Walker, 1865

= Sybrida inordinata =

Species of moth

Sybrida inordinata is a species of snout moth. It is found in Taiwan and India.
