= Arctioblepsis =

Scientific classification
- Domain: Eukaryota
- Kingdom: Animalia
- Phylum: Arthropoda
- Class: Insecta
- Order: Lepidoptera
- Family: Pyralidae
- Subfamily: Pyralinae
- Genus: Arctioblepsis; Felder & Felder, 1862
- Species: A. rubida

Binomial name
- Arctioblepsis rubida C. Felder & R. Felder, 1862

Synonyms
- Propachys nigrivena Walker, 1863

Genus of moths

Arctioblepsis is a monotypic genus of snout moths described by Cajetan Felder and Rudolf Felder in 1862. It contains the species Arctioblepsis rubida. It is found in south-east Asia, including Hong Kong, China, Taiwan, India and Nepal.

The wingspan is 36–44 mm. Adults are on wing from early April to early June and again from early July to mid August in Hong Kong.

The larvae have been recorded feeding on Machilus species, including Machilus breviflora and Machilus gamblei.
