= Adulis serratalis =

Scientific classification
- Kingdom: Animalia
- Phylum: Arthropoda
- Class: Insecta
- Order: Lepidoptera
- Family: Pyralidae
- Genus: Adulis
- Species: A. serratalis

Binomial name
- Adulis serratalis Ragonot, 1891

Species of moth

Adulis serratalis is a species of snout moth. It was described by Émile Louis Ragonot in 1891 and is found in the Gambia.
