= Embryoglossa submarginata =

Scientific classification
- Kingdom: Animalia
- Phylum: Arthropoda
- Class: Insecta
- Order: Lepidoptera
- Family: Pyralidae
- Genus: Embryoglossa
- Species: E. submarginata

Binomial name
- Embryoglossa submarginata (Kenrick, 1917)

Synonyms
- Taeniaphora submarginata Kenrick, 1917

Species of moth

Embryoglossa submarginata is a species of snout moth in the genus Embryoglossa. It was described by George Hamilton Kenrick in 1917 and is known from Madagascar.
