= Mesosindris =

Scientific classification
- Kingdom: Animalia
- Phylum: Arthropoda
- Class: Insecta
- Order: Lepidoptera
- Family: Pyralidae
- Subfamily: Pyralinae
- Genus: Mesosindris; Viette, 1960
- Species: M. paulianalis

Binomial name
- Mesosindris paulianalis Viette, 1960

Genus of moths

Mesosindris is a monotypic snout moth genus described by Pierre Viette in 1960. Its only species, Mesosindris paulianalis, described by the same author in the same year, is known from Madagascar.
