= Larice =

Scientific classification
- Kingdom: Animalia
- Phylum: Arthropoda
- Class: Insecta
- Order: Lepidoptera
- Family: Pyralidae
- Subfamily: Pyralinae
- Genus: Larice; Ragonot, 1892
- Species: L. swinhoei

Binomial name
- Larice swinhoei Ragonot, 1892

Genus of moths

Larice is a genus of snout moths. It was described by Ragonot in 1892, and contains the species L. swinhoei. It is found in India.
