= Epacternis maesalis =

Scientific classification
- Kingdom: Animalia
- Phylum: Arthropoda
- Class: Insecta
- Order: Lepidoptera
- Family: Pyralidae
- Genus: Epacternis
- Species: E. maesalis

Binomial name
- Epacternis maesalis Leraut, 2011

Species of moth

Epacternis maesalis is a species of snout moth in the genus Epacternis. It was described by Patrice J.A. Leraut in 2011 and is known from Kenya.
