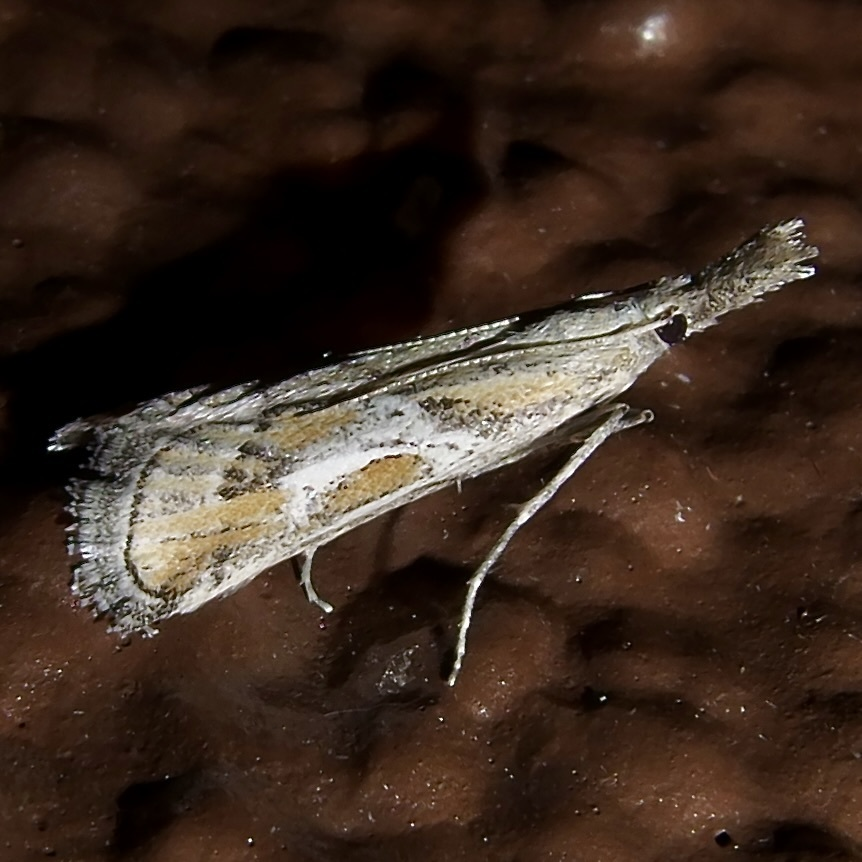

Scientific classification
- Domain: Eukaryota
- Kingdom: Animalia
- Phylum: Arthropoda
- Class: Insecta
- Order: Lepidoptera
- Family: Pyralidae
- Genus: Cacotherapia
- Species: C. interalbicalis

Binomial name
- Cacotherapia interalbicalis (Ragonot, 1891)

Synonyms
- Macrotheca interalbicalis Ragonot, 1891; Macrotheca vulnifera Dyar, 1917

= Cacotherapia interalbicalis =

Species of moth

Cacotherapia interalbicalis is a species of snout moth in the genus Cacotherapia. It was described by Émile Louis Ragonot in 1891, from Sonora, Mexico. It is also found in the southern United States.
