= Delopterus =

Scientific classification
- Kingdom: Animalia
- Phylum: Arthropoda
- Class: Insecta
- Order: Lepidoptera
- Family: Pyralidae
- Subfamily: Pyralinae
- Genus: Delopterus; Janse, 1922
- Species: D. basalis

Binomial name
- Delopterus basalis Janse, 1922

Genus of moths

Delopterus is a monotypic snout moth genus (family Pyralidae). Its single species, Delopterus basalis, is found in Namibia, South Africa and Zimbabwe. Both the genus and species, were first described by Anthonie Johannes Theodorus Janse in 1922.
