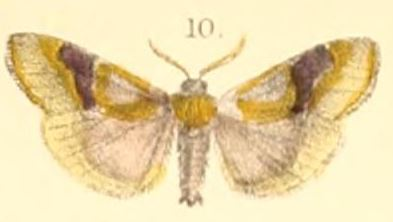

Scientific classification
- Domain: Eukaryota
- Kingdom: Animalia
- Phylum: Arthropoda
- Class: Insecta
- Order: Lepidoptera
- Family: Pyralidae
- Genus: Sacada
- Species: S. pyraliformis

Binomial name
- Sacada pyraliformis (Moore, 1879)

Synonyms
- Danaka pyraliformis Moore, 1878

= Sacada pyraliformis =

Species of moth

Sacada pyraliformis is a species of snout moth (family Pyralidae). It is found in India.
