= Burgeonidea =

Scientific classification
- Kingdom: Animalia
- Phylum: Arthropoda
- Class: Insecta
- Order: Lepidoptera
- Family: Pyralidae
- Subfamily: Pyralinae
- Genus: Burgeonidea; Ghesquière, 1942
- Species: B. meteoraula

Binomial name
- Burgeonidea meteoraula (Meyrick, 1934)

Synonyms
- Paracme meteoraula Meyrick, 1934

Genus of moths

Burgeonidea is a monotypic snout moth genus described by Jean Ghesquière in 1942. Its only species, Burgeonidea meteoraula, described by Edward Meyrick in 1934, is found in Uganda.
