= Minooa =

Scientific classification
- Kingdom: Animalia
- Phylum: Arthropoda
- Class: Insecta
- Order: Lepidoptera
- Family: Pyralidae
- Subfamily: Pyralinae
- Genus: Minooa; Yamanaka, 1996
- Species: M. yamamotoi

Binomial name
- Minooa yamamotoi Yamanaka, 1996

Genus of moths

Minooa is a monotypic snout moth genus described by Hiroshi Yamanaka in 1996. Its only species, Minooa yamamotoi, described in the same publication, is known from Osaka, Japan, where it was described from Minoo Park.
