= Epacternis =

Scientific classification
- Kingdom: Animalia
- Phylum: Arthropoda
- Class: Insecta
- Order: Lepidoptera
- Family: Pyralidae
- Subfamily: Pyralinae
- Genus: Epacternis; Meyrick, 1933

Genus of moths

Epacternis is a genus of snout moths. It was erected by Edward Meyrick in 1933.

== Species ==
- Epacternis alluaudalis Leraut, 2011
- Epacternis flavimedialis (Hampson, 1906)
- Epacternis mabokealis Leraut, 2011
- Epacternis maesalis Leraut, 2011
- Epacternis porphyraspis Meyrick, 1933
- Epacternis pyralis Leraut, 2011
