= Lophocera vadonalis =

Scientific classification
- Kingdom: Animalia
- Phylum: Arthropoda
- Class: Insecta
- Order: Lepidoptera
- Family: Pyralidae
- Genus: Lophocera
- Species: L. vadonalis

Binomial name
- Lophocera vadonalis Marion & Viette, 1956

Species of moth

Lophocera vadonalis is a species of snout moth in the genus Lophocera. It was described by Hubert Marion and Pierre Viette in 1956 and is known from Madagascar.
