= Elaealis =

Scientific classification
- Kingdom: Animalia
- Phylum: Arthropoda
- Class: Insecta
- Order: Lepidoptera
- Family: Pyralidae
- Subfamily: Pyralinae
- Genus: Elaealis; Hampson, 1906
- Species: E. olivalis

Binomial name
- Elaealis olivalis Hampson, 1906

Genus of moths

Elaealis is a monotypic snout moth genus. Its single species, Elaealis olivalis, is found in eastern Africa including Uganda. Both the genus and species were described by George Hampson in 1906.
