= Marionana paulianalis =

Scientific classification
- Kingdom: Animalia
- Phylum: Arthropoda
- Class: Insecta
- Order: Lepidoptera
- Family: Pyralidae
- Genus: Marionana
- Species: M. paulianalis

Binomial name
- Marionana paulianalis Viette, 1953

Synonyms
- Marionana vinolentalis Viette, 1960

Species of moth

Marionana paulianalis is a species of snout moth, and the type species in the genus Marionana. It was described by Viette in 1953, and is known from the Comoros and Madagascar.

== Subspecies ==
- Marionana paulianalis paulianalis (Madagascar)
- Marionana paulianalis cuprealis Viette, 1981 (Comoros)
