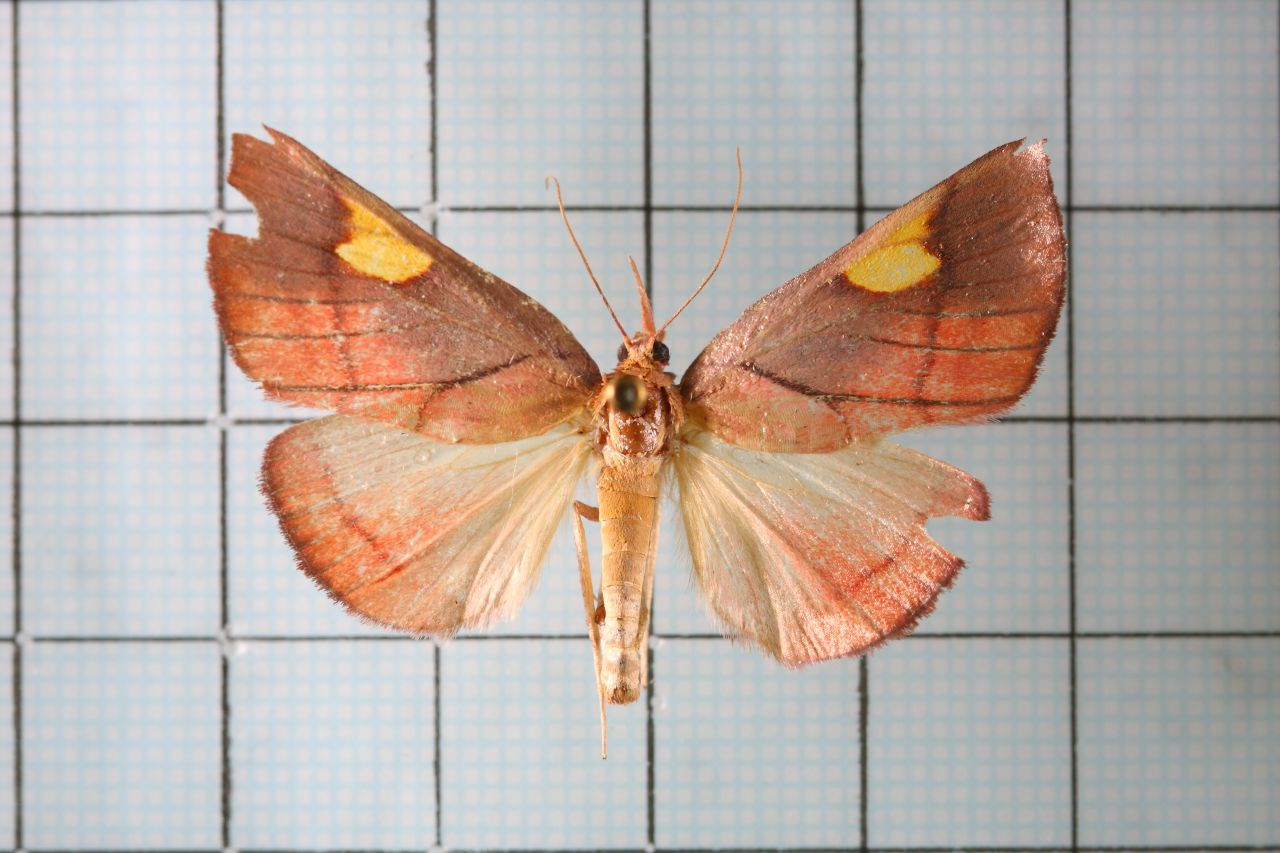

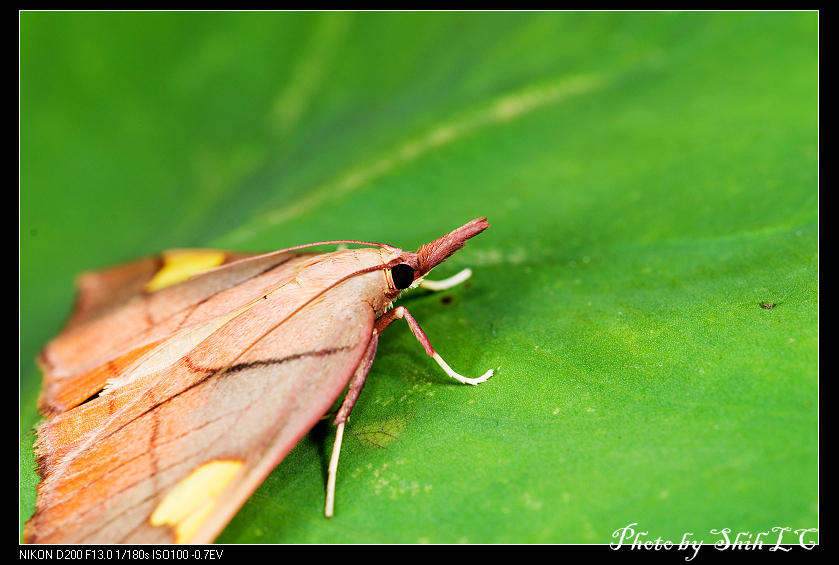

Scientific classification
- Kingdom: Animalia
- Phylum: Arthropoda
- Class: Insecta
- Order: Lepidoptera
- Family: Pyralidae
- Genus: Orybina
- Species: O. flaviplaga

Binomial name
- Orybina flaviplaga (Walker, 1863)

Synonyms
- Oryba flaviplaga Walker, 1863

= Orybina flaviplaga =

Species of moth

Orybina flaviplaga is a moth of the family Pyralidae described by Francis Walker in 1863. It is found in China, India, Thailand and Taiwan.

The wingspan is 39–42 mm. Adults are on wing in May.
