= Euryzonella =

Scientific classification
- Kingdom: Animalia
- Phylum: Arthropoda
- Class: Insecta
- Order: Lepidoptera
- Family: Pyralidae
- Subfamily: Pyralinae
- Genus: Euryzonella; Ghesquière, 1942
- Species: E. latisfascia

Binomial name
- Euryzonella latisfascia (Hampson, 1891)

Synonyms
- Generic: Euryzona Hampson, 1896; Specific: Pyralis latisfascia Hampson, 1891; Euryzona latisfascia

Genus of moths

Euryzonella is a monotypic snout moth genus described by Jean Ghesquière in 1942. Its only species, Euryzonella latisfascia, described by George Hampson in 1891, is found in India.
