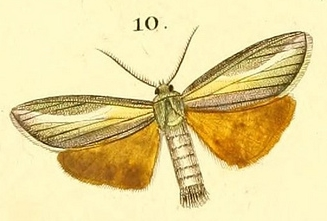
- Sindris sganzini

Scientific classification
- Domain: Eukaryota
- Kingdom: Animalia
- Phylum: Arthropoda
- Class: Insecta
- Order: Lepidoptera
- Family: Pyralidae
- Subfamily: Pyralinae
- Genus: Sindris; Boisduval, 1833

Type species
- Sindris sganzini Boisduval, 1833

= Sindris =

Genus of moths

Sindris is a genus of snout moths.

== Species ==
Some species of this genus are:

- Sindris bipunctalis Hampson, 1906
- Sindris cervinalis Hampson, 1896
- Sindris deltoidalis Hampson, 1906
- Sindris holochralis Hampson, 1906
- Sindris leucomelas Kenrick, 1917
- Sindris magnifica Jordan, 1904
- Sindris rogueti Leraut, 2013
- Sindris sganzini Boisduval, 1833
