= Discordia sakarahalis =

Scientific classification
- Kingdom: Animalia
- Phylum: Arthropoda
- Class: Insecta
- Order: Lepidoptera
- Family: Pyralidae
- Genus: Discordia
- Species: D. sakarahalis

Binomial name
- Discordia sakarahalis Marion & Viette, 1956

Species of moth

Discordia sakarahalis is a species of snout moth in the genus Discordia. It was described by Hubert Marion and Pierre Viette in 1956 and is known from Madagascar. The type location is Sakaraha, from which its specific epithet is derived.
