= Imerina mabillalis =

Scientific classification
- Kingdom: Animalia
- Phylum: Arthropoda
- Class: Insecta
- Order: Lepidoptera
- Family: Pyralidae
- Genus: Imerina
- Species: I. mabillalis

Binomial name
- Imerina mabillalis Ragonot, 1891

Species of moth

Imerina mabillalis is a species of snout moth in the genus Imerina. It was described by Émile Louis Ragonot in 1891 and is known from Madagascar.

It is the type species of the genus Imerina.

== Taxonomy ==
The species was introduced by Ragonot in his work on the classification of Pyralinae.

== Distribution ==
I. mabillalis is recorded from Madagascar.
