= Cacotherapia =

Scientific classification
- Kingdom: Animalia
- Phylum: Arthropoda
- Class: Insecta
- Order: Lepidoptera
- Family: Pyralidae
- Subfamily: Galleriinae
- Tribe: Cacotherapiini
- Genus: Cacotherapia; Dyar, 1904

Synonyms
- Macrotheca Ragonot, 1891

Genus of moths

Cacotherapia is a genus of snout moths. It was described by Harrison Gray Dyar Jr. in 1904 and is known from the United States, Guatemala, Mexico, and Panama.

== Species ==
- Cacotherapia angulalis (Barnes & McDunnough)
- Cacotherapia bilinealis (Barnes & McDunnough, 1918)
- Cacotherapia demeridalis (Schaus, 1924)
- Cacotherapia flexilinealis Dyar, 1905
- Cacotherapia interalbicalis (Ragonot, 1891)
- Cacotherapia lecerfialis (Barnes & Benjamin, 1925)
- Cacotherapia leucocope (Dyar, 1917)
- Cacotherapia nigrocinereella (Hulst, 1900)
- Cacotherapia poecilostigma (Dyar, 1914)
- Cacotherapia ponda Dyar, 1907
- Cacotherapia unicoloralis (Barnes & McDunnough, 1913)
- Cacotherapia unipuncta (Dyar, 1913)
