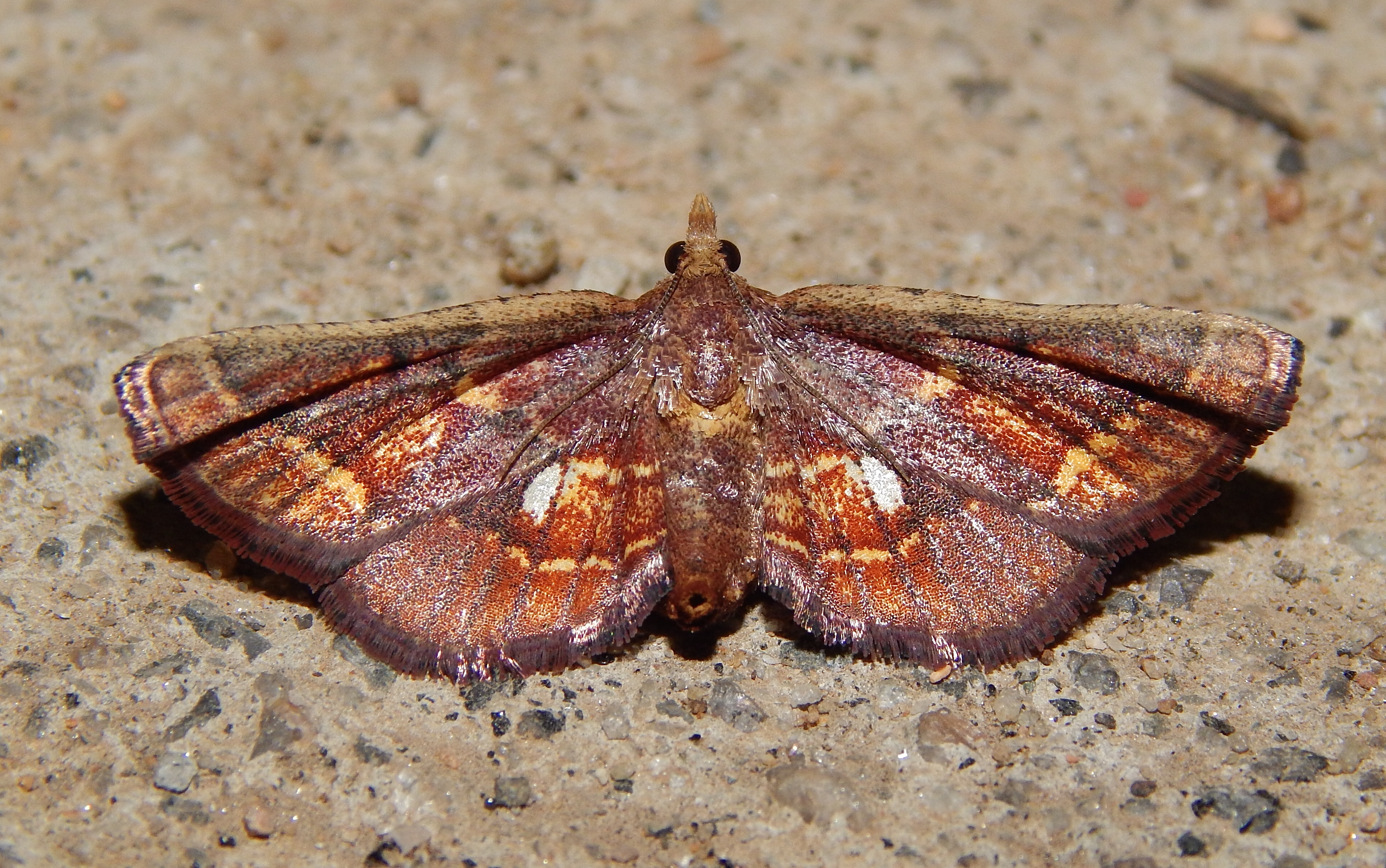
- Z. torridalis in the Western Ghats, India

Scientific classification
- Domain: Eukaryota
- Kingdom: Animalia
- Phylum: Arthropoda
- Class: Insecta
- Order: Lepidoptera
- Family: Pyralidae
- Subfamily: Pyralinae
- Tribe: Pyralini
- Genus: Zitha; Walker, 1866

Type species
- Zitha punicealis Walker, 1866

Synonyms
- Koremalepis Hampson, 1891; Sphalerosticha Warren, 1897; Tegulifera Saalmüller, 1880

= Zitha =

Genus of moths

Zitha is a genus of snout moths.

== Species ==
Some species of this genus are: (incomplete list)

- Zitha absconsalis Leraut, 2011
- Zitha adjunctalis Leraut, 2007
- Zitha agnielealis Leraut, 2011
- Zitha albostrigalis Saalmüller, 1880
- Zitha allutalis (Zeller, 1852)
- Zitha alticolalis Leraut, 2011
- Zitha ambatosoratralis Leraut, 2008
- Zitha ambinanitalis (Viette, 1960)
- Zitha ambodirianalis Leraut, 2011
- Zitha ambralis Leraut, 2011
- Zitha ankafinalis Leraut, 2007
- Zitha ankasokalis (Viette, 1960)
- Zitha anneliese (Viette, 1981)
- Zitha barbutalis Leraut, 2008
- Zitha belalonalis Leraut, 2011
- Zitha betsakotsakoalis Leraut, 2011
- Zitha bombycalis Leraut, 2007
- Zitha capuronalis (Viette, 1960)
- Zitha catochrysalis (Ragonot, 1891)
- Zitha cyanealis (Mabille, 1879)
- Zitha decrepis (Viette, 1989)
- Zitha deuvealis Leraut, 2009
- Zitha didyalis Leraut, 2008
- Zitha gallienalis Viette, 1960
- Zitha geometralis Leraut, 2007
- Zitha gueneealis Leraut, 2011
- Zitha herbulotalis (Marion, 1954)
- Zitha hiarakalis Leraut, 2011
- Zitha hongalis Leraut, 2011
- Zitha ignalis (Guenée, 1854)
- Zitha joannisalis Leraut, 2008
- Zitha lalannealis Leraut, 2009
- Zitha laminalis (Guenée, 1854)
- Zitha lanitralis Viette, 1978
- Zitha legrandalis Leraut, 2009
- Zitha lignosalis (Viette, 1960)
- Zitha luquetalis Leraut, 2011
- Zitha maesalis Leraut, 2007
- Zitha mangindranoalis Leraut, 2008
- Zitha mantasoalis Leraut, 2011
- Zitha marionalis (Viette, 1960)
- Zitha martinealis Leraut, 2011
- Zitha matsaboryalis Leraut, 2011
- Zitha millotalis Viette, 1960
- Zitha minetalis Leraut, 2008
- Zitha mixtalis Leraut, 2011
- Zitha montreuilalis Leraut, 2009
- Zitha munroealis Leraut, 2008
- Zitha navattealis Leraut, 2008
- Zitha noctualis Leraut, 2007
- Zitha nosivolalis (Viette, 1960)
- Zitha novembralis Leraut, 2009
- Zitha nussalis Leraut, 2011
- Zitha oecophoralis Leraut, 2007
- Zitha panemerialis Leraut, 2007
- Zitha pernalis (Viette, 1960)
- Zitha pronubalis (Marion & Viette, 1956)
- Zitha punicealis Walker, 1866
- Zitha pyraustalis Leraut, 2007
- Zitha radamalis (Viette, 1960)
- Zitha ragonotalis (Viette, 1960)
- Zitha ranaivosoloalis Leraut, 2011
- Zitha rosalinde Viette, 1981
- Zitha rubicundalis Saalmüller, 1880
- Zitha sahafaryalis Leraut, 2011
- Zitha sakavondroalis Leraut, 2008
- Zitha sambavalis Leraut, 2009
- Zitha sanguinalis (Marion, 1954)
- Zitha saturninalis Leraut, 2011
- Zitha secundalis Leraut, 2008
- Zitha sogalis (Viette, 1960)
- Zitha sublignosalis Leraut, 2011
- Zitha subcupralis (Zeller, 1852)
- Zitha subochracea (Warren, 1897)
- Zitha subradamalis Leraut, 2011
- Zitha subvinosalis Leraut, 2011
- Zitha tertialis Leraut, 2008
- Zitha torridalis (Lederer, 1863)
- Zitha tortricoidalis Leraut, 2007
- Zitha toulgoetalis Leraut, 2009
- Zitha touretalbyalis Leraut, 2008
- Zitha tsarafidyalis Leraut, 2011
- Zitha tsaratananalis Leraut, 2011
- Zitha viettealis Leraut, 2009
- Zitha vieualis Leraut, 2011
- Zitha vincentalis Leraut, 2009
- Zitha vinosalis Leraut, 2011
- Zitha whalleyalis (Viette, 1960)
- Zitha zombitsalis 'Viette, 1960)
