= Hirayamaia =

Scientific classification
- Domain: Eukaryota
- Kingdom: Animalia
- Phylum: Arthropoda
- Class: Insecta
- Order: Lepidoptera
- Family: Pyralidae
- Subfamily: Pyralinae
- Genus: Hirayamaia; Marumo, 1917
- Species: H. regalis

Binomial name
- Hirayamaia regalis (Leech, 1889)

Synonyms
- Oryba regalis Leech, 1889; Orybina regalis

Species of crustacean

Hirayamaia is a monotypic snout moth genus described by Nobukatsu Marumo in 1917. Its only species, Hirayamaia regalis, was described by John Henry Leech in 1889. It is found in Korea, Japan and China.

The wingspan is 28–30 mm. Adults are on wing from June to September.
