= Tanaobela =

Scientific classification
- Kingdom: Animalia
- Phylum: Arthropoda
- Class: Insecta
- Order: Lepidoptera
- Superfamily: Pyraloidea
- Family: incertae sedis
- Genus: Tanaobela Turner, 1915
- Species: T. chrysochlora

Binomial name
- Tanaobela chrysochlora Turner, 1915

Genus of moths

Tanaobela is a genus of moths in the superfamily Pyraloidea containing only one species, Tanaobela chrysochlora, which is found in Australia, where it has been recorded from Queensland. Its affiliations are disputed.

The wingspan is about 20 mm. The forewings are yellowish-green without defined markings, although there is a brownish streak on the base of the costa and a minute dot beneath the mid-costa, as well as traces of a pale-fuscous dentate transverse line and some fuscous suffusion at the tornus. The hindwings are pale-pinkish with a narrow dark-fuscous sub-dorsal blotch.
