= Diloxia fimbriata =

Scientific classification
- Kingdom: Animalia
- Phylum: Arthropoda
- Class: Insecta
- Order: Lepidoptera
- Family: Pyralidae
- Genus: Diloxia
- Species: D. fimbriata

Binomial name
- Diloxia fimbriata Hampson, 1896

Species of moth

Diloxia fimbriata is a species of snout moth (family Pyralidae) in the genus Diloxia. It was described by George Hampson in 1896. It is found in India.

The wingspan is 24–30 mm.
