= Micromystix =

Scientific classification
- Kingdom: Animalia
- Phylum: Arthropoda
- Class: Insecta
- Order: Lepidoptera
- Family: Pyralidae
- Subfamily: Pyralinae
- Genus: Micromystix de Joannis, 1929
- Species: M. exigua

Binomial name
- Micromystix exigua de Joannis, 1929

Genus of moths

Micromystix, is a monotypic snout moth genus described by Joseph de Joannis in 1929. Its only species, Micromystix exigua, described by the same author in the same year, is known from Vietnam (including Tonkin, the type location).
