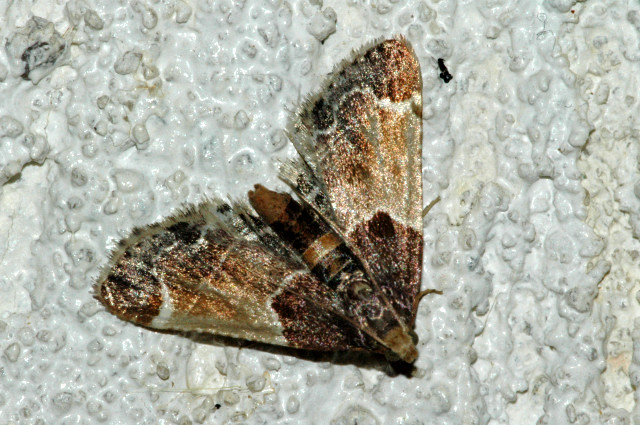
- Meal moth (Pyralis farinalis) imago (Pyralini)

Scientific classification
- Kingdom: Animalia
- Phylum: Arthropoda
- Clade: Pancrustacea
- Class: Insecta
- Order: Lepidoptera
- Family: Pyralidae
- Subfamily: Pyralinae; Latreille, 1809

Type species
- Phalaena (Pyralis) farinalis Linnaeus, 1758

Tribes
- Endotrichini; Hypotiini; Pyralini and see text

= Pyralinae =

Subfamily of moths

The Pyralinae are the typical subfamily of snout moths (family Pyralidae) and occur essentially worldwide, in some cases aided by involuntary introduction by humans. They are rather rare in the Americas however, and their diversity in the Australian region is also limited. Altogether, this subfamily includes about 900 described species, but new ones continue to be discovered. Like many of their relatives in the superfamily Pyraloidea, the caterpillar larvae of Pyralinae – and in some cases even the adults – have evolved the ability to use unusual foods for nutrition; a few of these can become harmful to humans as pests of stored goods.

== Description and ecology ==
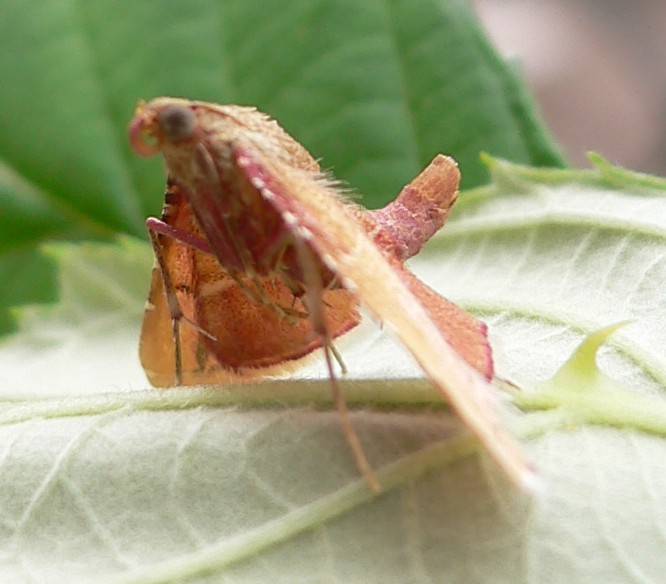
Adult Endotricha flammealis of the Endotrichini in typical resting pose

This subfamily unites mid-sized to smallish moths with a more or less cryptic coloration including most often various hues of brownish colors. Adult females of Pyralinae (except Cardamyla and Embryoglossa) are characterized by the short genital ductus bursae, their corpus bursae barely extending forward beyond abdominal segment 7. Otherwise they are undistinguished mid-sized moths (large by Pyralidae standards) which at least sometimes can be differentiated from their relatives by possessing forewing vein 7 and having hindwing veins 7 and 8 unjoined as adults.

The meal moth (Pyralis farinalis) and the grease moth (Aglossa pinguinalis) are pests of stored food products, in the case of the grease moth including fats (which are also eaten by the adult moths), and have been inadvertently spread almost worldwide by transport of such goods. Most other species' caterpillars are leaf feeders; the extremely polyphagous larvae of Pyralis manihotalis have been reared from bat guano.

== Systematics ==
The systematics and taxonomy of this subfamily is somewhat provisional. No quantitative phylogenetic analysis had been done as of 2007, but in the mid-late 1990s, Michael Shaffer of the London Natural History Museum and Maria Alma Solis of the National Museum of Natural History prepared the groundwork for further studies by their comprehensive qualitative reviews of Pyralinae morphology. Some cladistic studies of the Pyraloidea do exist however, and these place the Pyralinae among the advanced snout moths, a lineage which otherwise includes the even more autapomorphic subfamilies Epipaschiinae and Phycitinae.

Even though the Pyralinae contain a high number of genera and species, there are a mere three tribes generally accepted nowadays. Others that were proposed earlier (in some cases even as independent subfamilies within Pyralidae) are presently treated as junior synonyms of the Pyralini. A large number of genera are considered not to be reliably assignable to one of the three tribes. It is not certain that the presently-used subdivisions of the Pyralinae are the last word on the issue.

The tribes – with some significant genera and species also noted – and the genera of unclear affiliation in this subfamily are:

Endotrichini Ragonot, 1890 (= Endotrichinae)

- Endotricha Zeller, 1847
  - Endotricha flammealis
  - Endotricha ignealis
  - Endotricha pyrosalis
- Persicoptera Meyrick, 1884
  - Persicoptera compsopa

Hypotiini Chapman, 1902 (= Hypotiinae)

- Hypotia Zeller, 1847

Pyralini

- Almost 40 genera

Genera incertae sedis

- Acteniopsis Amsel, 1959
- Adulis Ragonot, 1891
- Aglossodes Ragonot, 1891
- Antisindris Marion, 1955
- Arctioblepsis C. & R.Felder, 1862
- Benderia Amsel, 1949
- Betsimisaraka Marion, 1955
- Burgeonidea Ghesquière, 1942
- Celetostola Meyrick, 1936
- Comaria Ragonot, 1892
- Cosmethella Munroe & Shaffer, 1980
- Delopterus Janse, 1922
- Diboma Walker, 1863
- Diloxia Hampson, 1896
- Discordia Swinhoe, 1885
- Elaealis Hampson, 1906
- Embryoglossa Warren, 1896
- Epacternis Meyrick, 1933
- Ethelontides Meyrick, 1934
- Euryzonella Ghesquière, 1942
- Eutrichodes Warren, 1891
- Grammiphlebia Hampson, 1906
- Gvelilia Strand, 1920
- Haplosindris Viette, 1953
- Heterocrasa Warren, 1896
- Hirayamaia Marumo, 1917
- Hyboloma Ragonot, 1891
- Hypanchyla Warren, 1891
- Hypsidia Rothschild, 1896
- Imerina Ragonot, 1891
- Lamacha Walker, 1863
- Larice Ragonot, 1892
- Latagognoma Tams, 1935
- Lophocera Kenrick, 1917
- Lorymav Walker, 1859 (Pyralini?)
- Lorymana Strand, 1915
- Lorymodes Hampson, 1917
- Macropyralis Amsel, 1953
- Marionana Viette, 1953
- Maschalandra Meyrick, 1937
- Meca Karsch, 1900
- Megalomia Ragonot, 1891
- Melanalis Hampson, 1906
- Mesosindris Viette, 1967
- Methora Walker, 1866
- Micromystix de Joannis, 1929
- Mimicia Caradja, 1925
- Minooa Yamanaka, 1996
- Mittonia Whalley, 1964
- Namibina Leraut, 2007
- Namibiodes Leraut, 2007
- Neobostra Hampson, 1906
- Nhoabe Viette, 1953
- Nussia Leraut, 2009
- Ocydina Meyrick, 1936
- Omphalobasella Strand, 1915
- Omphalomia Swinhoe, 1894
- Orybina Snellen, 1895
- Parachmidia Hampson, 1896
- Paraglossa Hampson, 1906
- Paraphycita Hampson, 1901
- Perforadix Sein, 1930
- Perula Mabille, 1900
- Peucela Ragonot, 1891
- Phasga Walker, 1863
- Pithyllis Grünberg, 1910
- Poliostola Janse, 1922
- Polycampsis Warren, 1896
- Propachys Walker, 1863
- Proropera Warren, 1896
- Prosaris Meyrick, 1894
- Proteinia Hampson, 1896
- Pseudozitha Leraut, 2007
- Pyralosis Amsel, 1957
- Rhynchetera Hampson, 1896
- Rhynchopygia Hampson, 1896
- Rostripalpus Hampson, 1896
- Rungsina Leraut, 2004
- Sacada Walker, 1862
- Setomigma Ghesquière, 1942
- Scotomera Butler, 1881 (Pyralini?)
- Sindris Boisduval, 1833
- Sphalerosticha Warren, 1897
- Sybrida Walker, 1865
- Tegulifera Saalmüller, 1880 (Pyralini?)
- Toccolosida Walker, 1863
- Trihauchenia Warren, 1892
- Triphassa Hübner, 1818
- Tyndis Ragonot, 1891
- Vitessidia Rothschild & Jordan, 1905
- Xenomilia Warren, 1896
- Zitha Walker, [1866] (including Tamraca; Pyralini?)

The genus Micronix, formerly placed here, seems to belong to the Crambidae, but its exact placement is obscure. For a similar case, see Tanaobela.
