= Lamacha =

Scientific classification
- Kingdom: Animalia
- Phylum: Arthropoda
- Class: Insecta
- Order: Lepidoptera
- Family: Pyralidae
- Subfamily: Pyralinae
- Genus: Lamacha; Walker, 1863
- Species: L. bilineolata

Binomial name
- Lamacha bilineolata Walker, 1863

Genus of moths

Lamacha is a monotypic genus of snout moths. It was described by Francis Walker in 1863 and contains the species Lamacha bilineolata. It is found in China.
