= Mitromorpha exigua =

Scientific classification
- Kingdom: Animalia
- Phylum: Mollusca
- Class: Gastropoda
- Subclass: Caenogastropoda
- Order: Neogastropoda
- Superfamily: Conoidea
- Family: Mitromorphidae
- Genus: Mitromorpha
- Species: M. exigua

Binomial name
- Mitromorpha exigua (Von Maltzan, 1884)

Synonyms
- Mitra exigua Von Maltzan, 1884; Volutomitra exigua H.F. Von Maltzan, 1884

Species of gastropod

Mitromorpha exigua is a species of sea snail, a marine gastropod mollusk in the family Mitromorphidae.
