= Pyralosis =

Scientific classification
- Kingdom: Animalia
- Phylum: Arthropoda
- Clade: Pancrustacea
- Class: Insecta
- Order: Lepidoptera
- Family: Pyralidae
- Subfamily: Pyralinae
- Tribe: Pyralini
- Genus: Pyralosis; Amsel, 1957

Genus of moths

Pyralosis is a genus of snout moths described by Hans Georg Amsel in 1957.

== Species ==
- Pyralosis polycyclophora (Hampson, 1916)
- Pyralosis terminalis (Rothschild, 1915)
