= Mordellistena exigua =

Scientific classification
- Kingdom: Animalia
- Phylum: Arthropoda
- Class: Insecta
- Order: Coleoptera
- Suborder: Polyphaga
- Infraorder: Cucujiformia
- Family: Mordellidae
- Genus: Mordellistena
- Species: M. exigua

Binomial name
- Mordellistena exigua (Boheman, 1858)

Synonyms
- Mordella exigua Boheman, 1858

Species of beetle

Mordellistena exigua is a beetle in the genus Mordellistena of the family Mordellidae. It was described in 1858 by Carl Henrik Boheman.
