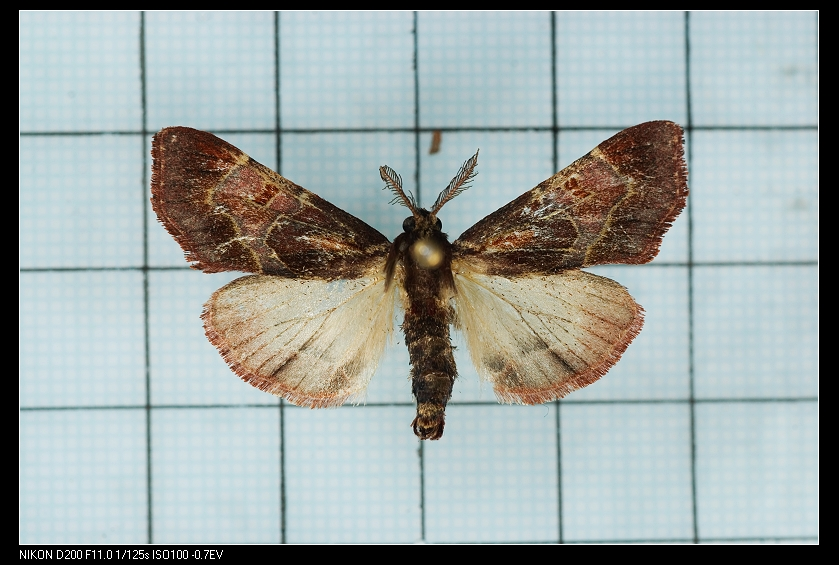
- Sacada discinota

Scientific classification
- Domain: Eukaryota
- Kingdom: Animalia
- Phylum: Arthropoda
- Class: Insecta
- Order: Lepidoptera
- Family: Pyralidae
- Genus: Sacada; Walker, 1862

Synonyms
- Paravetta Moore, [1866]; Datanoides Butler, 1878; Danaka Moore, 1879; Xestula Snellen, 1885; Kawiella Roepke, 1943

= Sacada (moth) =

Genus of moths

Sacada is a genus of snout moths described by Francis Walker in 1862.

== Species ==
In alphabetical order:

- Sacada acutipennis Strand, 1915
- Sacada approximans (Leech, 1889)
- Sacada constrictalis Ragonot, 1891
- Sacada discinota (Moore, [1866])
- Sacada fasciata (Butler, 1878)
- Sacada flexuosa Snellen, 1890
- Sacada miraculosa (Snellen, 1885)
- Sacada pallescens Hampson, 1896
- Sacada pyraliformis (Moore, 1879)
- Sacada rubralis Holland, 1900
- Sacada unilinealis Hampson, 1896
