= Pyraloidea =

- European corn borer, Ostrinia nubilalis

Scientific classification
- Kingdom: Animalia
- Phylum: Arthropoda
- Clade: Pancrustacea
- Class: Insecta
- Order: Lepidoptera
- Clade: Obtectomera
- Superfamily: Pyraloidea

Families
- Pyralidae; Crambidae

Diversity
- about 2,100 genera, roughly 16,000 described species

Superfamily of moths

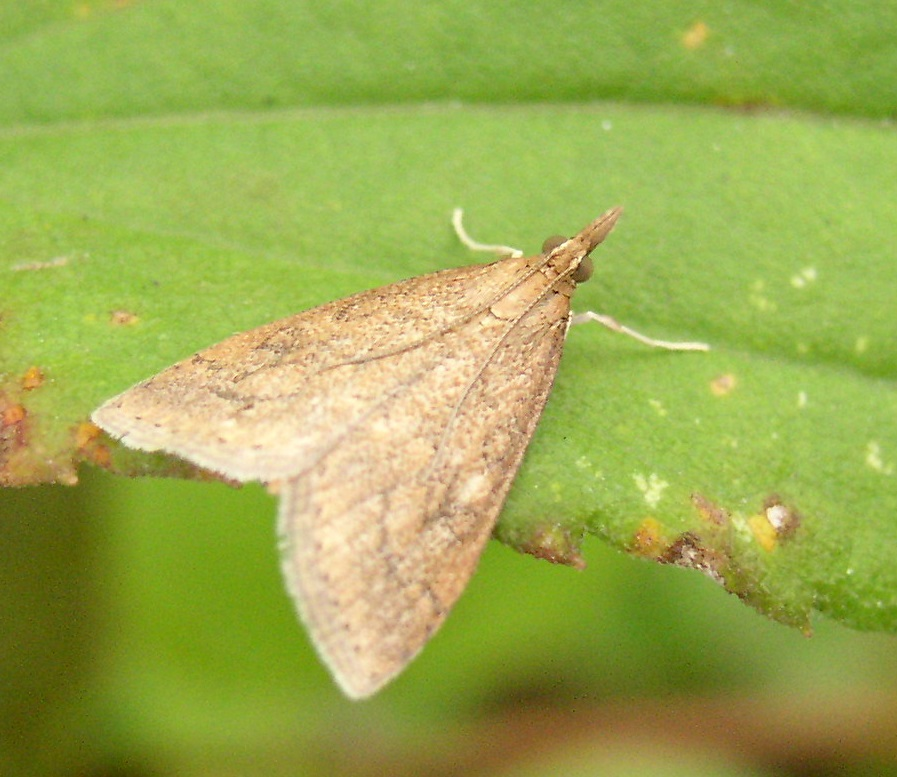
Udea rubigalis

The Pyraloidea (pyraloid moths or snout moths) are a moth superfamily containing about 16,000 described species worldwide, and probably at least as many more remain to be described. They are generally fairly small moths, and as such, they have been traditionally associated with the paraphyletic Microlepidoptera.

This superfamily used to contain the Hyblaeidae, Thyrididae, Alucitidae (plus Tineodidae), Pterophoridae, and Pyralidae. The first four families are now each split off as a distinct superfamily.

Nowadays, Pyralidae are usually split into the Pyralidae sensu stricto and the Crambidae, as both groups have been shown to be monophyletic and a sister group.

Some genera (e.g. Micronix and Tanaobela) still defy easy classification and have been variously assigned to the Crambidae or the Pyralidae.

Among all Lepidoptera, pyraloids show the most diverse life history adaptations. The larvae of most species feed on living plants either internally or externally as leaf rollers, leaf webbers leaf miners, borers, root feeders, and seed feeders. Some species live parasitically in ant nests (Wurthiini), prey on scale insects (certain Phycitinae), or live in the nests of bees (Galleriinae). The larvae of the Acentropinae are adapted to life under water, and certain Phycitinae and Pyralinae are adapted to very dry environments and their larvae feed on stored food products. Others feed on animal detritus such as carrion and feces.

With such a variety of living habits, pyraloids are used in biodiversity studies. Some species are of economic importance, e.g.:

- rice stem borers (Chilo spp.; Scirpophaga spp.)
- sod grass webworms (different species of Crambinae)
- Indian meal moth (Plodia interpunctella)
- European corn borer (Ostrinia nubilalis)
- Indo-Australian coconut spike moth (Tirathaba rufivena)
- Cacao moth (Ephestia elutella)
- Mediterranean flour moth (Ephestia kuehniella)
- wax moths (Achroia grisella, Galleria mellonella)
- rice moth (Corcyra cephalonica)
- beet webworm (Spoladea recurvalis)
- European pepper moth (Duponchelia fovealis)
- legume pod borer (Maruca vitrata)
- eggplant fruit borers (Leucinodes spp.).
