= Stilbenoid =

Class of chemical compounds

Resveratrol is a biologically important stilbenoid.

Stilbenoids are hydroxylated derivatives of stilbene. They have a C_{6}–C_{2}–C_{6} structure. In biochemical terms, they belong to the family of phenylpropanoids and share most of their biosynthesis pathway with chalcones. Most stilbenoids are produced by plants, and the only known exception is the antimicrobial stilbenoid drug tapinarof which is biosynthesized by the Gram-negative bacterium Photorhabdus luminescens.

== Chemistry ==
Stilbenoids are hydroxylated derivatives of stilbene and have a C_{6}–C_{2}–C_{6} structure. They belong to the family of phenylpropanoids and share most of their biosynthesis pathway with chalcones. Under UV irradiation, stilbene and its derivatives undergo intramolecular cyclization, called stilbene photocyclization to form dihydrophenanthrenes. Oligomeric forms are known as oligostilbenoids.

== Types ==
Aglycones

- Piceatannol in the roots of Norway spruces
- Pinosylvin is a fungal toxin protecting wood from fungal infection, found in trees of the pine family
- Pterostilbene in almonds, pine and vaccinium berries
- Resveratrol in grapes

Glycosides

- Astringin in the bark of Norway spruce
- Piceid is a resveratrol derivative in grape juices

== Production ==
Stilbenoids are produced in various plants; for example, they are secondary products of heartwood formation in trees that can act as phytoalexins. Another example is resveratrol, an antifungal found in grapes and suggested to have health benefits. Ampelopsin A and Ampelopsin B are resveratrol dimers produced in porcelain berry.

A bacterial stilbenoid, (E)-3,5-dihydroxy-4-isopropyl-trans-stilbene, is produced by Photorhabdus which is a bacterial symbiont of nematode worms called Heterorhabditis, obligate parasites of insects.

Stilbenoids are secondary metabolites present in Cannabis sativa.

== Properties ==
Phytoalexins have been suggested by some studies to be responsible for resistance to some tree diseases, such as pine wilt.

== See also ==
- Combretastatins, many are stilbenoids
- Dihydrostilbenoids, no double bond on the bridge
- List of antioxidants in food
- List of phytochemicals in food
- Phytochemistry
- Secondary metabolites
- Stilbestrol

== Books ==
- Hillis, W.E. (1987). Heartwood and Tree Exudates. Berlin, Heidelberg: Springer Berlin Heidelberg. ISBN 978-3-642-72534-0.
- YAMADA, Toshihiro; ITO, Shin-ichiro (1993). "Chemical Defense Responses of Wilt-Resistant Pine Species, Pinus strobus and P. taeda, against Bursaphelenchus xylophilus Infection". Japanese Journal of Phytopathology. 59 (6): 666–672. doi:10.3186/jjphytopath.59.666.
