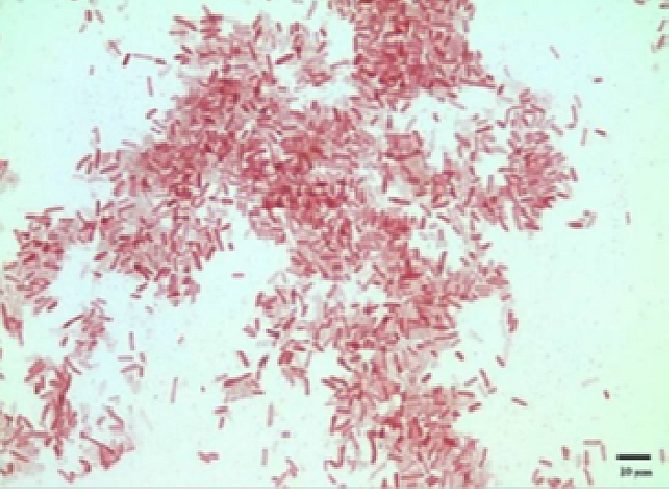

Scientific classification
- Domain: Bacteria
- Kingdom: Pseudomonadati
- Phylum: Pseudomonadota
- Class: Gammaproteobacteria
- Order: Enterobacterales
- Family: Morganellaceae
- Genus: Photorhabdus
- Species: P. luminescens

Binomial name
- Photorhabdus luminescens (Thomas et Poinar, 1979) Boemare et al. 1993 emend.

Synonyms
- Xenorhabdus luminescens

= Photorhabdus luminescens =

Species of bacterium

Photorhabdus luminescens (previously called Xenorhabdus luminescens) is a Gammaproteobacterium of the family Morganellaceae, and is a lethal pathogen of insects.

It lives in the gut of an entomopathogenic nematode of the family Heterorhabditidae. When the nematode infects an insect, P. luminescens is released into the blood stream and rapidly kills the insect host (within 48 hours) by producing toxins, such as the high molecular weight insecticidal protein complex Tca. P. luminescens also produces a proteic toxin through the expression of a single gene called makes caterpillars floppy (mcf).

It also secretes enzymes which break down the body of the infected insect and bioconvert it into nutrients which can be used by both nematode and bacteria. In this way, both organisms gain enough nutrients to replicate (or reproduce in the case of the nematode) several times. The bacteria enter the nematode progeny as they develop.

3,5-Dihydroxy-4-isopropyl-trans-stilbene is produced by P. luminescens bacterial symbiont of the nematode Heterorhabditis megidis. Experiments with Galleria mellonella infected larvae supports the hypothesis that the compound has antibiotic properties that help minimize competition from other microorganisms and prevents the putrefaction of the nematode-infected insect cadaver.

P. luminescens is bioluminescent; however, the reason for this is not yet properly understood.

It has been reported that infection by this bacterium of the wounds of soldiers in the American Civil War at the Battle of Shiloh caused the wounds to glow, and that this aided the survival of the soldiers due to the production of antibiotics by P. luminescens. This led to the phenomenon's nickname "Angel's Glow." There are no contemporary accounts of this phenomenon, meaning that it may be a myth or that conditions including low temperatures, low lighting, abundance of blood, time on battlefield, presence of specific vegetation, presence of rain and humidity, and the time to organize medical evacuation would prevent the phenomenon from recurring in current conditions.

Studies have also shown it can have acaricidal attributes. A new strain of the bacterium P. luminescens achieved up to 90% mortality of the mite Tetranychus truncatus in laboratory tests. The researchers compared the 0805-P2R and 2103-RUVI strains. The 2103-RUVI strain was isolated from entomopathogenic nematodes collected in southern Taiwan. The team evaluated bacterial growth, proteolytic activity, and acaricidal effect against T. truncatus, a species with a history of acaricide resistance. The best result was obtained using the culture supernatant from the 2103-RUVI strain. Mortality reached 90% within 72 hours. Under the same conditions, the 0805-P2R strain reached 83%.

P. luminescens' genome has been sequenced. It contains a MACPF protein, however, this molecule appears non-lytic. It also contains the gcvB RNA gene which encodes a small non-coding RNA involved in the regulation of a number of amino acid transport systems as well as amino acid biosynthetic genes.

A deletion of the hfq gene causes loss of secondary metabolite production.

It is a source for bioluminescence imaging.

== See also ==
- Pseudomonas protegens, another insect pathogenic bacterium
