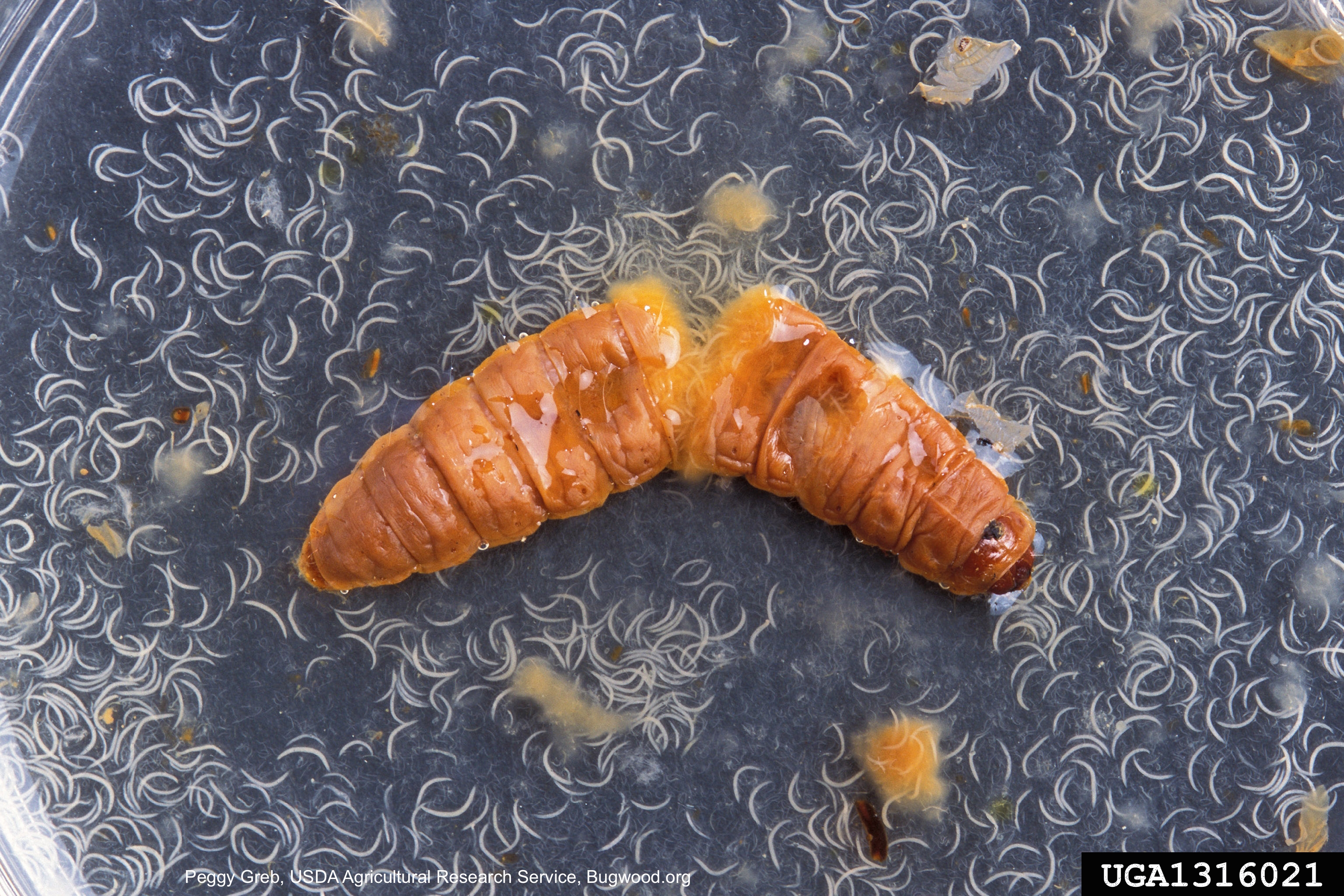
- Entomopathogenic nematodes emerging from a wax moth cadaver

Scientific classification
- Domain: Eukaryota
- Kingdom: Animalia
- Phylum: Nematoda
- Class: Chromadorea
- Order: Rhabditida
- Family: Heterorhabditidae
- Genus: Heterorhabditis
- Species: H. megidis

Binomial name
- Heterorhabditis megidis Poinar, Jackson & Klein, 1987

= Heterorhabditis megidis =

Species of roundworm

Heterorhabditis megidis is a species of nematodes in the genus Heterorhabditis. All species of this genus are obligate parasites of insects, and some are used as biological control agents for the control of pest insects.

Heterorhabditis megidis nematodes are hosts for the Photorhabdus luminescens bacterial symbiont. It can be used to fight the Japanese beetle, Popillia japonica (Scarabaeidae: Coleoptera), in Ohio.

3,5-Dihydroxy-4-isopropyl-trans-stilbene is a bacterial stilbenoid produced by the P. luminescens bacterial symbiont species of the entomopathogenic nematode, H. megidis. Experiments with infected larvae of Galleria mellonella, the wax moth, support the hypothesis that the compound has antibiotic properties that help minimize competition from other microorganisms and prevents the putrefaction of the nematode-infected insect cadaver.
