= Waxworm =

Caterpillar larvae of wax moths

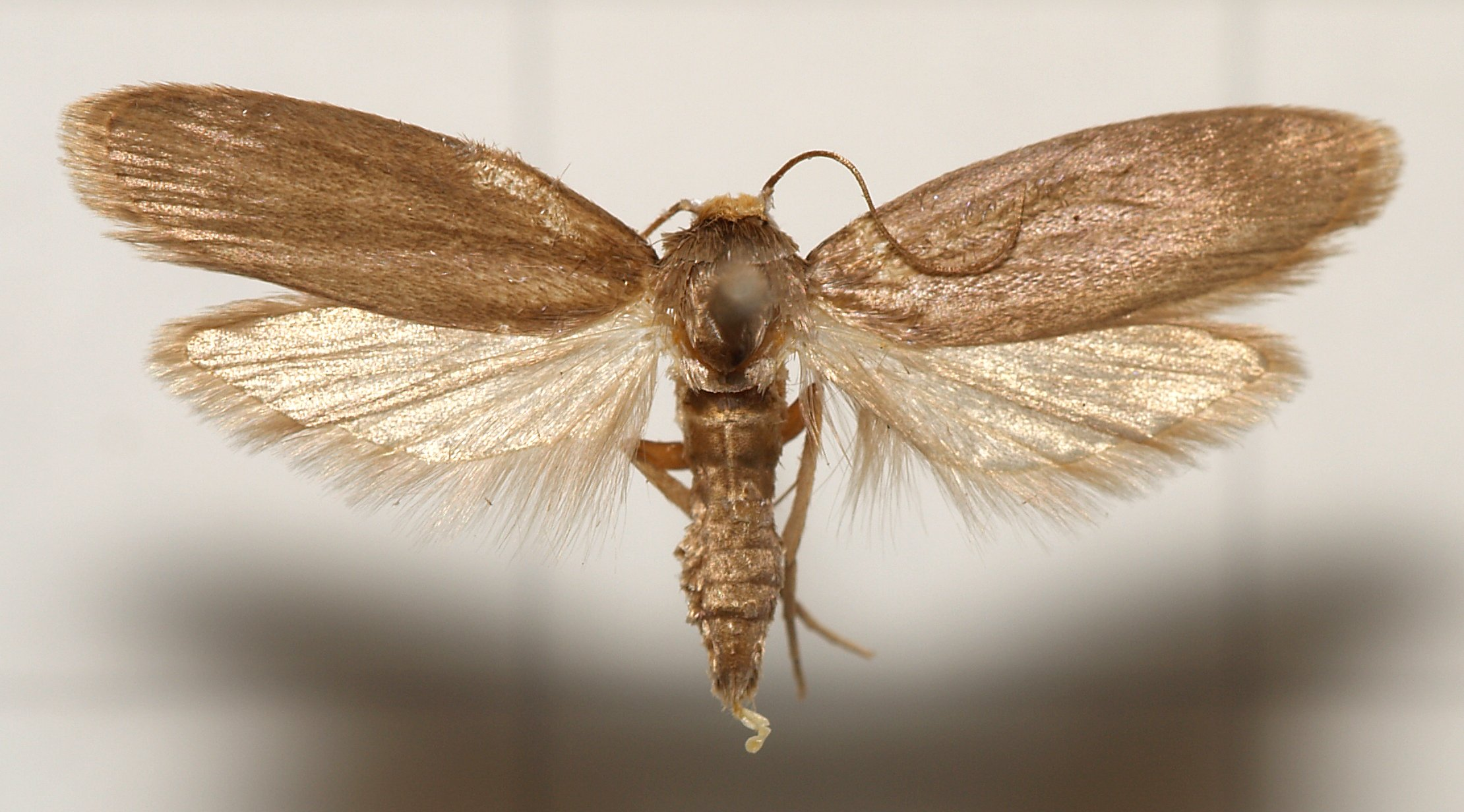
Adult specimen of the lesser wax moth (Achroia grisella)

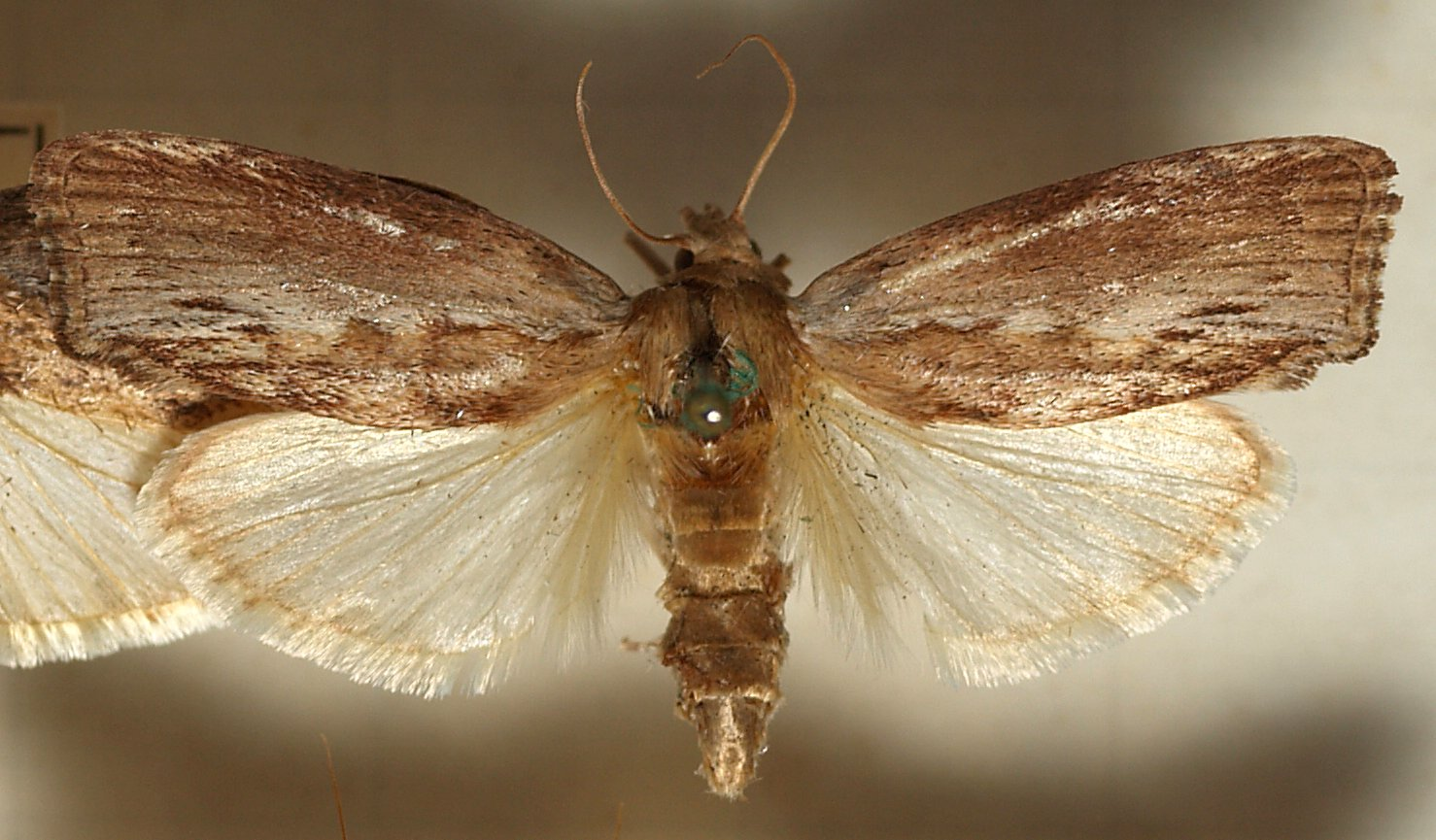
Adult specimen of the greater wax moth (Galleria mellonella)

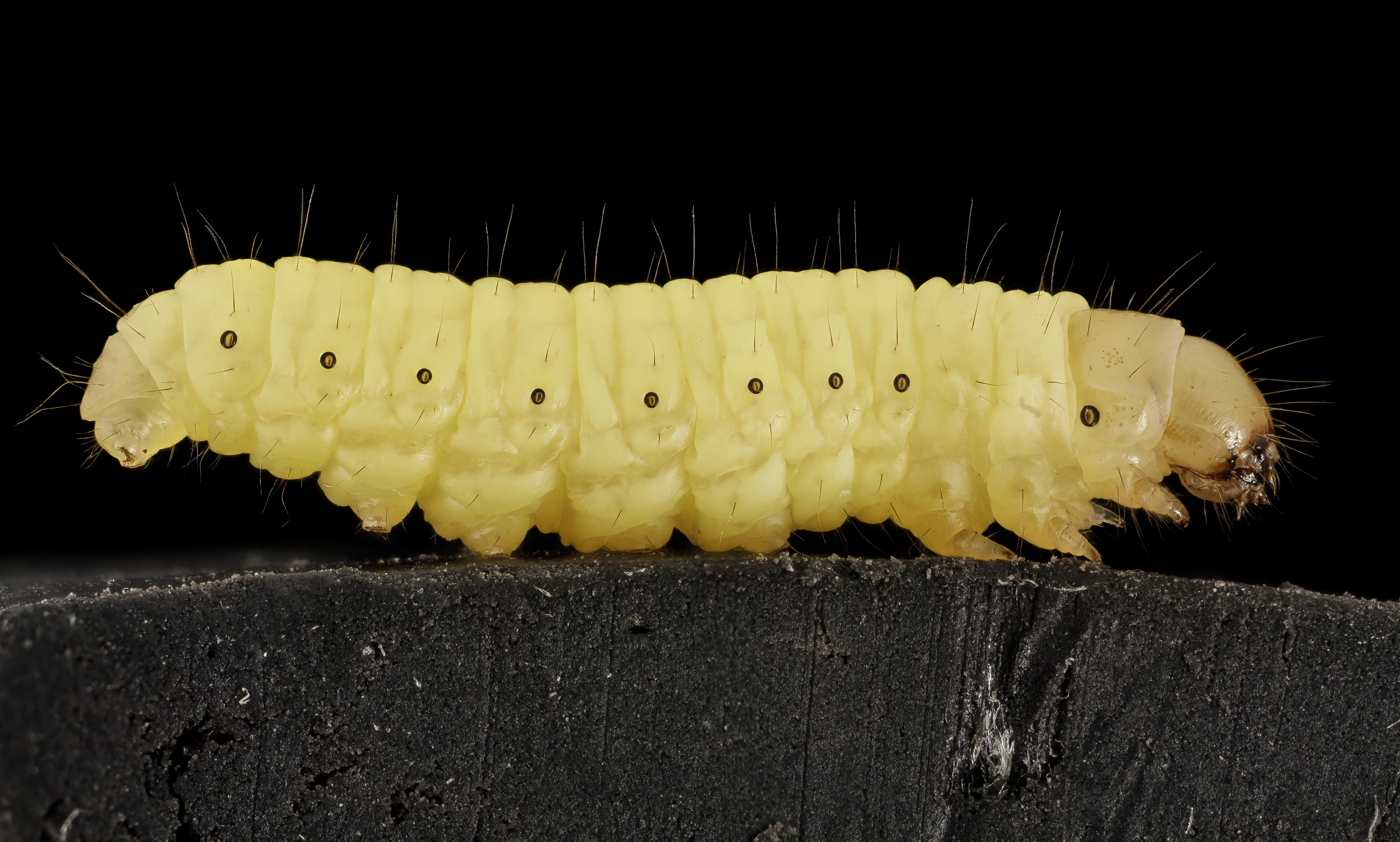
G. mellonella larva

Waxworms are the caterpillar larvae of wax moths, which belong to the family Pyralidae (snout moths). Two closely related species are commercially bred – the lesser wax moth (Achroia grisella) and the greater wax moth (Galleria mellonella). They belong to the tribe Galleriini in the snout moth subfamily Galleriinae. Another species whose larvae share that name is the Indianmeal moth (Plodia interpunctella), though this species is not available commercially.

The adult moths are sometimes called "bee moths", but, particularly in apiculture, this can also refer to Aphomia sociella, another Galleriinae moth which also produces waxworms, but is not commercially bred.

Waxworms are medium-white caterpillars with black-tipped feet and small, black or brown heads.

In the wild, they live as nest parasites in bee colonies and eat cocoons, pollen, and shed skins of bees, and chew through beeswax, thus the name. Beekeepers consider waxworms to be pests. Galleria mellonella (the greater wax moths) will not attack the bees directly, but feed on the wax used by the bees to build their honeycomb. Their full development to adults requires access to used brood comb or brood cell cleanings—these contain protein essential for the larvae's development, in the form of brood cocoons. The destruction of the comb will spill or contaminate stored honey and may kill bee larvae or be the cause of the spreading of honey bee diseases.

When kept in captivity, they can go a long time without eating, particularly if kept at a cool temperature. Captive waxworms are usually raised on a mixture of cereal grain, bran, and honey.

== Waxworms as a food source ==
Waxworms are a commonly used food for many insectivorous animals and plants in captivity. These larvae are grown extensively for use as food for humans, as well as live food for terrarium pets and some pet birds, mostly due to their high fat content, their ease of breeding, and their ability to survive for weeks at low temperatures. They are recommended for use as a treat rather than a staple food, due to their relative lack of nutrients when compared to crickets and mealworms. Their high fat and food energy (caloric) density can also contribute to obesity in captive animals if they are fed waxworms too often, especially in animals with a low metabolism, such as reptiles.

Most commonly, they are used to feed reptiles such as bearded dragons (species in the genus Pogona), the neon tree dragon (Diploderma splendidum), geckos, brown anoles (Anolis sagrei), turtles such as the three-toed box turtle (Terrapene carolina triunguis), and chameleons. They can also be fed to amphibians such as Ceratophrys frogs, newts such as Strauch's spotted newt (Neurergus strauchii), and salamanders such as axolotls. Small mammals such as the domesticated hedgehog can also be fed with waxworms, while birds such as the greater honeyguide can also appreciate the food. They can also be used as food for captive predatory insects reared in terraria, such as assassin bugs in the genus Platymeris, and are also occasionally used to feed certain kinds of fish in the wild, such as bluegills (Lepomis macrochirus).

== Waxworms as bait ==
Waxworms may be store-bought or raised by anglers. Anglers and fishing bait shops often refer to the larvae as "waxies". They are used for catching some varieties of panfish, members of the sunfish family (Centrarchidae), green sunfish (Lepomis cyanellus) and can be used for shallow-water fishing with the use of a lighter weight. They are also used for fishing some members of the family Salmonidae, masu salmon (Oncorhynchus masou), white-spotted char (Salvelinus leucomaenis), and rainbow trout (Oncorhynchus mykiss).

=== Uses ===
==== Fishing ====
Anglers use waxworms usually provided by commercial suppliers to catch trout. Waxworms are popular bait for anglers in Japan. Anglers throw handfuls into the "swim" they are targeting, attracting the trout to the area. The angler then uses the largest or most attractive waxworms on the hook, hoping to be irresistible to the fish.

== Waxworms as an alternative to mammals in animal research ==
Waxworms can replace mammals in certain types of scientific experiments with animal testing, especially in studies examining the virulence mechanisms of bacterial and fungal pathogens. Waxworms prove valuable in such studies because the innate immune system of insects is strikingly similar to that of mammals. Waxworms survive well at human body temperature and are large enough in size to allow straightforward handling and accurate dosing. Additionally, the considerable cost savings when using waxworms instead of small mammals (usually mice, hamsters, or guinea pigs) allows testing throughput that is otherwise impossible. Using waxworms, it is now possible to screen large numbers of bacterial and fungal strains to identify genes involved in pathogenesis or large chemical libraries with the hope of identifying promising therapeutic compounds. The later studies have proved especially useful in identifying chemical compounds with favorable bioavailability.

== Biodegradation of plastic ==
Two species of waxworm, Galleria mellonella and Plodia interpunctella have both been observed eating and digesting polyethylene plastic (plastivory). The waxworms metabolize polyethylene plastic films into ethylene glycol, a compound which biodegrades rapidly. This unusual ability to digest matter classically thought of as non-edible may originate with the waxworm's ability to digest beeswax as a result of gut microbes that are essential in the biodegradation process. Two strains of bacteria, Enterobacter asburiae and Bacillus sp, isolated from the guts of Plodia interpunctella waxworms, have been shown to decompose polyethylene in laboratory testing. In a test with a 28-day incubation period of these two strains of bacteria on polyethylene films, the films' hydrophobicity decreased. In addition, damage to the films' surface with pits and cavities (0.3–0.4 μm in depth) was observed using scanning electron microscopy and atomic-force microscopy.

Placed in a polyethylene shopping bag, about 100 Galleria mellonella waxworms consumed almost 0.1 g (0.0035 oz) of the plastic over the course of 12 hours in laboratory conditions.

== See also ==
- Pyralis regalis
- Hypsopygia mauritialis
