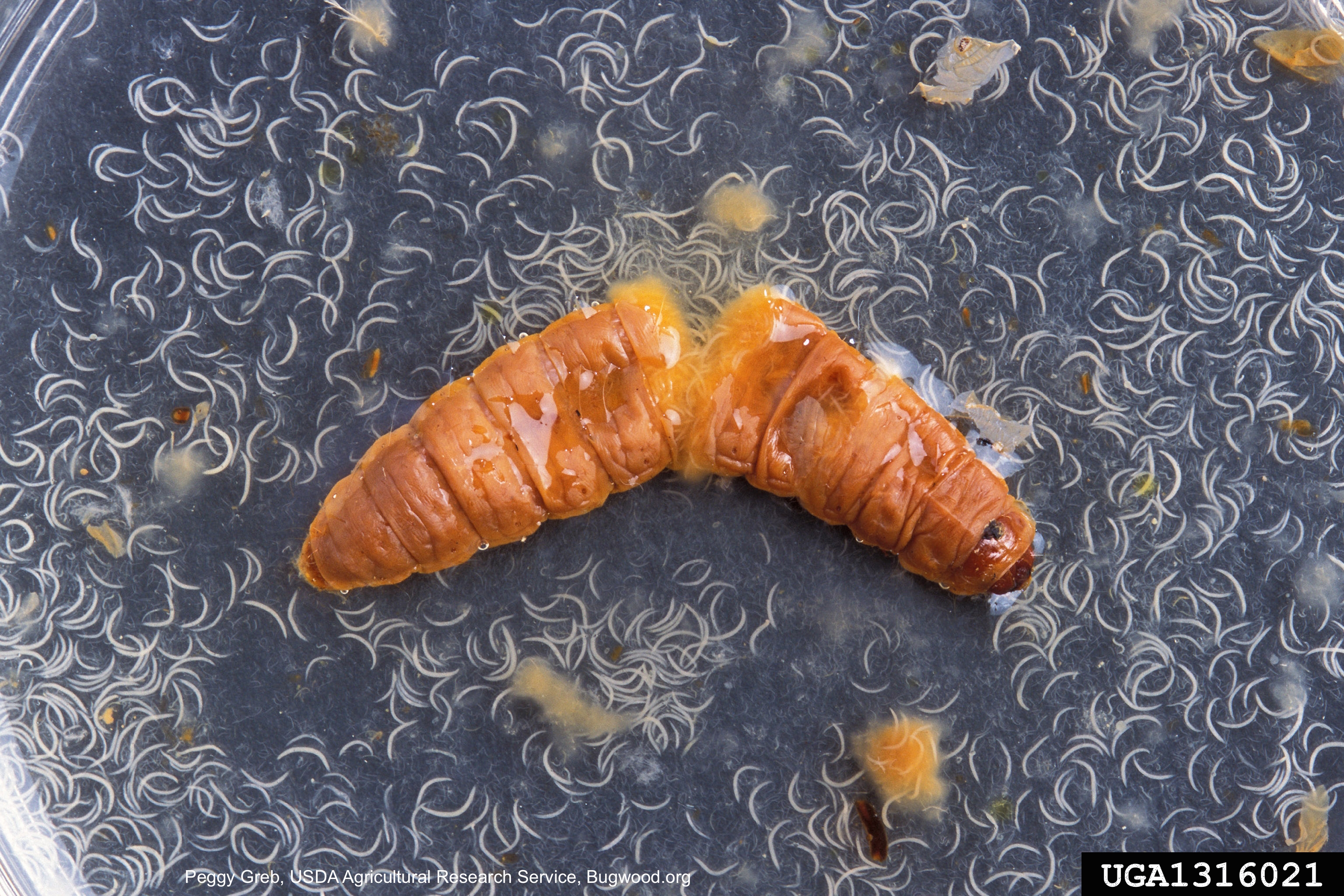
- Heterorhabditis bacteriophora nematodes emerging from a greater wax moth.

Scientific classification
- Kingdom: Animalia
- Phylum: Nematoda
- Class: Chromadorea
- Order: Rhabditida
- Family: Heterorhabditidae
- Genus: Heterorhabditis
- Species: H. bacteriophora

Binomial name
- Heterorhabditis bacteriophora Poinar, 1976

= Heterorhabditis bacteriophora =

Species of roundworm

Heterorhabditis bacteriophora is a species of entomopathogenic nematode known commonly as beneficial nematodes. They are microscopic and are used in gardening as a form of biological pest control. They are used to control ants, fleas, moths, beetles, flies, weevils, and other pests.

These beneficial nematodes enter target insect larva via mouth, anus or respiratory openings and starts to feed. To reproduce the nematodes release Photorhabdus bacteria from their digestive tract. The bacteria rapidly multiply in the target insect larva and kill it. The nematodes then use the larva cadaver to grow and reproduce.

== Biological systems research ==
These nematodes are amenable to in vitro culture, making them of interest to evolutionary and molecular biologists who investigate parasitic and symbiotic systems. Heterorhabditis bacteriophora was selected by the National Human Genome Research Institute as a sequencing target. In 2013, the inbred strain H. bacteriophora TTO1 was sequenced using Roche 454 technology, and a high-quality 77 Mb draft genome assembly was produced.
