= Carotenoid isomerooxygenase =

Identifiers
- EC no.: 1.13.11.65

Databases
- IntEnz: IntEnz view
- BRENDA: BRENDA entry
- ExPASy: NiceZyme view
- KEGG: KEGG entry
- MetaCyc: metabolic pathway
- PRIAM: profile
- PDB structures: RCSB PDB PDBe PDBsum
Search
- PMC: articles
- PubMed: articles
- NCBI: proteins

Carotenoid isomerooxygenase (EC 1.13.11.65, ninaB (gene)) is an enzyme with systematic name zeaxanthin:oxygen 15,15'-oxidoreductase (bond-cleaving, cis-isomerizing).

This enzyme catalyses the following chemical reaction:

zeaxanthin + O_{2} $\rightleftharpoons$ (3R)-11-cis-3-hydroxyretinal + (3R)-all-trans-3-hydroxyretinal

The enzyme from the moth Galleria mellonella and the fruit fly Drosophila melanogaster takes part in the synthesis of retinal.
