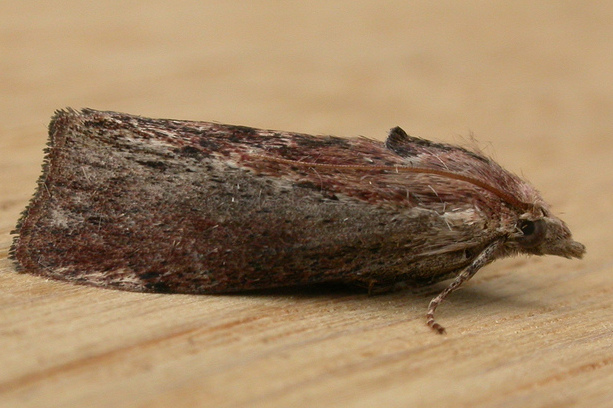
- Adult Galleria mellonella

Scientific classification
- Kingdom: Animalia
- Phylum: Arthropoda
- Clade: Pancrustacea
- Class: Insecta
- Order: Lepidoptera
- Family: Pyralidae
- Subfamily: Galleriinae
- Tribe: Galleriini; Zeller, 1848

Genera
- See text

= Galleriini =

Tribe of moths

Galleriini is a tribe of moths of the subfamily Galleriinae.

== Genera ==
In alphabetical order:

- Achroia Hübner, [1819]
- Cathayia Hampson, 1901
- Chevalierella Ghesquière, 1943
- Dinopleura Turner, 1942
- Eloeidiphilos Praviel, 1938
- Galleria Fabricius, 1798
- Pseudarenipses Speidel & Schmitz, 1991
- Trachylepidia Ragonot, 1887
