= Phelsuma comorensis =

Conservation status
- Near Threatened (IUCN 3.1)

Scientific classification
- Kingdom: Animalia
- Phylum: Chordata
- Class: Reptilia
- Order: Squamata
- Suborder: Gekkota
- Family: Gekkonidae
- Genus: Phelsuma
- Species: P. comorensis

Binomial name
- Phelsuma comorensis Boettger, 1913
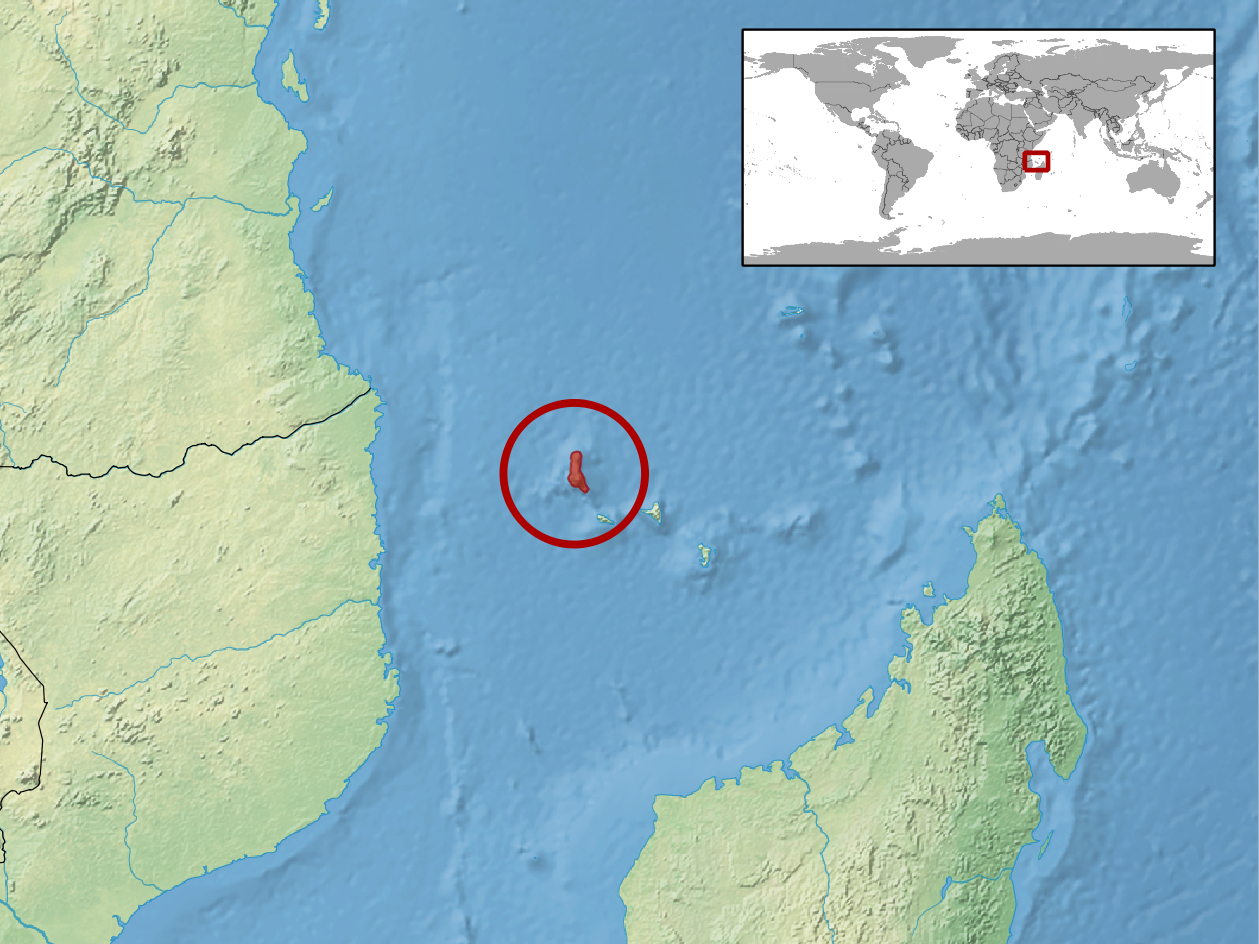

Species of lizard

Phelsuma comorensis, commonly known as the Comoros day gecko, is a species of gecko endemic to the island of Grande Comore, Comoros. It typically dwells on trees, and feeds on insects and nectar.

== Description ==
This lizard belongs to the smallest day geckos. It can reach a maximum length of about 12 centimetres (4.7 in). The body colour is olive green or pale green. A rost-coloured stripe extends from the nostril to the eye. A black lateral stripe extends from the eye to the hind leg. On the lower back there are brownish or red-brick coloured dots. The legs have dark spots.

== Distribution ==
This species is only known from the island Grande Comore. It is found in higher areas (600 meters and upwards). It is not currently endangered.

== Habitat ==
P. comorensis is often found on a variety of pantropic vegetation.

== Diet ==
These day geckos feed on various insects and other invertebrates. They also like to lick soft, sweet fruit, pollen and nectar.

== Reproduction ==
The females are very productive and lay up to 8 pairs of eggs per year. Juveniles reach sexual maturity after only 4–5 months.

== Care and maintenance in captivity ==
These animals should be housed in pairs and need an enclosure with live plants and vertical bamboo shoots. The temperature should be between 28 °C (82 °F) and 30 °C (86 °F) during the day with a 6-7 °C drop during the night. A good air flow is important. In captivity, these animals can be fed with crickets, wax moth, fruit flies, mealworms and houseflies.
