= Cathayia lineata =

Scientific classification
- Kingdom: Animalia
- Phylum: Arthropoda
- Class: Insecta
- Order: Lepidoptera
- Family: Pyralidae
- Genus: Cathayia
- Species: C. lineata

Binomial name
- Cathayia lineata (Turner, 1942)

Synonyms
- Dinopleura lineata Turner, 1942

Species of moth

Cathayia lineata is a species of snout moth in the genus Cathayia. It was described by Turner in 1942, and is known from Queensland, Australia.
