= Cathayia obliquella =

Scientific classification
- Kingdom: Animalia
- Phylum: Arthropoda
- Class: Insecta
- Order: Lepidoptera
- Family: Pyralidae
- Genus: Cathayia
- Species: C. obliquella

Binomial name
- Cathayia obliquella Hampson in Ragonot, 1901

Species of moth

Cathayia obliquella is a species of snout moth in the genus Cathayia. It was described by George Hampson in 1901 and is known from Japan and central China.
