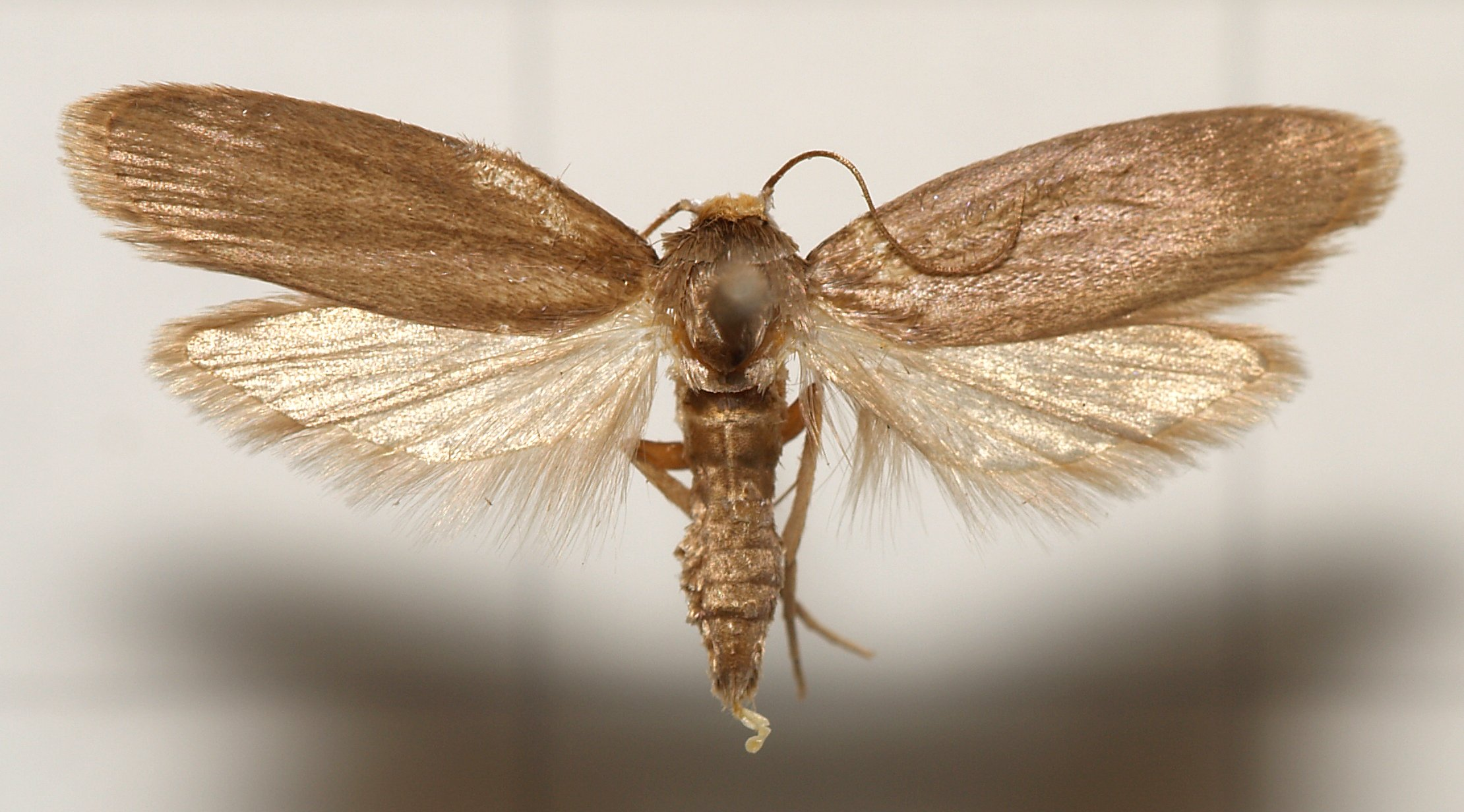
- Adult lesser wax moth (A. grisella)
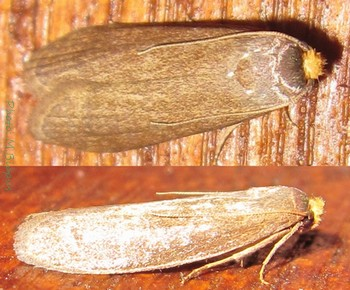

Scientific classification
- Kingdom: Animalia
- Phylum: Arthropoda
- Clade: Pancrustacea
- Class: Insecta
- Order: Lepidoptera
- Family: Pyralidae
- Tribe: Galleriini
- Genus: Achroia; Hübner, 1819

Type species
- Bombyx cinereola Hübner, [1803]

Synonyms
- Several, see text

= Achroia =

Genus of moths

Achroia is a genus of small moths of the snout moth family (Pyralidae). It belongs to the tribe Galleriini of subfamily Galleriinae.

It has only one unequivocally recognized species:

- Achroia grisella (Fabricius, 1794) – lesser wax moth

Others are mentioned here with doubtful validity:

- Achroia aluearia Fabricius 1798
- Achroia alvea Haworth 1811
- Achroia anticella Walker 1863
- Achroia cinereola Hübner 1802
- Achroia ifranella Lucas 1955
- Achroia innotata (Walker, 1864)
- Achroia obscurevittella Ragonot 1901

Invalid junior synonyms of this genus are:

- Achroea Agassiz, 1847 (unjustified emendation)
- Acroia (lapsus)
- Meliphora Guenée, 1845
- Vobrix Walker, 1864
