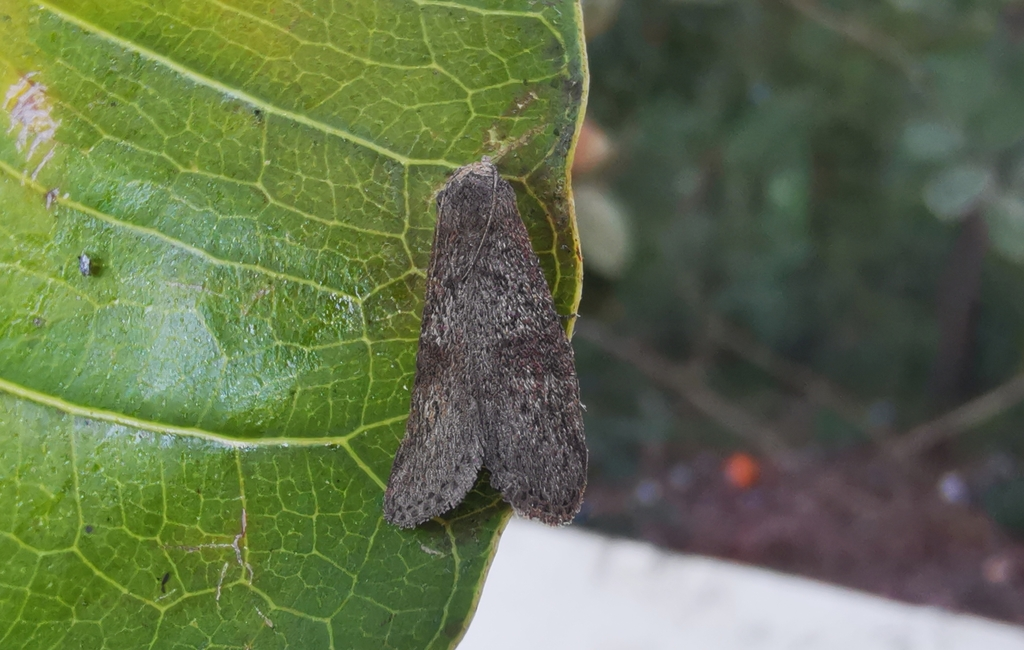

Scientific classification
- Kingdom: Animalia
- Phylum: Arthropoda
- Clade: Pancrustacea
- Class: Insecta
- Order: Lepidoptera
- Family: Pyralidae
- Subfamily: Galleriinae
- Tribe: Galleriini
- Genus: Trachylepidia; Ragonot, 1887
- Species: T. fructicassiella

Binomial name
- Trachylepidia fructicassiella Ragonot, 1887

Synonyms
- Trachylepidia indecora Dyar, 1921

= Trachylepidia =

Genus of moths

Trachylepidia fructicassiella is a moth of the family Pyralidae first described by Émile Louis Ragonot in 1887. It is the only species in the genus Trachylepidia. It is found in India, Pakistan and Sri Lanka.

The wingspan of the adult is 20–32 mm. Dorsum dusky brown and ventrum light brown. Proboscis short almost concealed. Apical margin of forewings crenulated with apical angle sub-rounded. Apical margin of hindwings slightly sinuated, with apical angle sub-rounded. Anterior and posterior margin of both wings are convex.

The caterpillar is a pest on pods of Cassia roxburghii and Cassia fistula. Parasierola species are known parasitoids of these caterpillars.
