= Cathayia =

Scientific classification
- Kingdom: Animalia
- Phylum: Arthropoda
- Class: Insecta
- Order: Lepidoptera
- Family: Pyralidae
- Tribe: Galleriini
- Genus: Cathayia; Hampson in Ragonot, 1901

Synonyms
- Dinopleura Turner, 1942; Pseudarenipses Speidel & Schmitz, 1991

Genus of moths

Cathayia is a genus of snout moths. It was described by George Hampson in 1901 and is known from Spain, Australia, China and Borneo.

== Species ==
- Cathayia insularum (Speidel & Schmitz, 1991)
- Cathayia lineata (Turner, 1942)
- Cathayia obliquella Hampson in Ragonot, 1901
- Cathayia purpureotincta Hampson, 1917
