= Heterorhabditis zealandica =

Scientific classification
- Kingdom: Animalia
- Phylum: Nematoda
- Class: Chromadorea
- Order: Rhabditida
- Family: Heterorhabditidae
- Genus: Heterorhabditis
- Species: H. zealandica

Binomial name
- Heterorhabditis zealandica (Poinar, 1990)

Species of roundworm

Heterorhabditis zealandica is a nematode species in the genus Heterorhabditis.
