= Cathayia purpureotincta =

Scientific classification
- Kingdom: Animalia
- Phylum: Arthropoda
- Class: Insecta
- Order: Lepidoptera
- Family: Pyralidae
- Genus: Cathayia
- Species: C. purpureotincta

Binomial name
- Cathayia purpureotincta Hampson, 1917

Species of moth

Cathayia purpureotincta is a species of snout moth in the genus Cathayia. It was described by George Hampson in 1917 and is known from Borneo.

The head and thorax are rufous with a few blackish scales. The abdomen is paler rufous. The forewings are bright rufous irrorated (sprinkled) with black and slightly tinged with purple, the veins with slight pale streaks. The hindwings are ochreous tinged and irrorated with brown. The underside is reddish ochreous irrorated with dark brown, on the forewing tinged with purplish red.
