= Heterorhabditis heliothidis =

Scientific classification
- Domain: Eukaryota
- Kingdom: Animalia
- Phylum: Nematoda
- Class: Chromadorea
- Order: Rhabditida
- Family: Heterorhabditidae
- Genus: Heterorhabditis
- Species: H. heliothidis

Binomial name
- Heterorhabditis heliothidis (Khan, Brooks & Hirschmann, 1976)

Species of roundworm

Heterorhabditis heliothidis is a nematode species in the genus Heterorhabditis.

It is a parasite of insects such as the Colorado potato beetle or snout moths in the genus Crambus.
