= Cathayia insularum =

Scientific classification
- Kingdom: Animalia
- Phylum: Arthropoda
- Clade: Pancrustacea
- Class: Insecta
- Order: Lepidoptera
- Family: Pyralidae
- Genus: Cathayia
- Species: C. insularum

Binomial name
- Cathayia insularum (Speidel & Schmitz, 1991)

Synonyms
- Pseudarenipses insularum Speidel & Schmitz, 1991

Species of moth

Cathayia insularum is a species of snout moth in the genus Cathayia. It was described by Speidel and Schmitz in 1991, and is known from Spain, Malta and the Canary Islands.

The larvae have been recorded feeding on the inflorescence of Phoenix canariensis and Phoenix dactylifera
