= Chevalierella elaeidis =

Scientific classification
- Kingdom: Animalia
- Phylum: Arthropoda
- Clade: Pancrustacea
- Class: Insecta
- Order: Lepidoptera
- Family: Pyralidae
- Subfamily: Galleriinae
- Tribe: Galleriini
- Genus: Chevalierella; Ghesquière, 1943
- Species: C. elaeidis

Binomial name
- Chevalierella elaeidis Ghesquière, 1943

Species of moth

Chevalierella is a monotypic snout moth genus described by Jean Ghesquière in 1943. Its only species, Chevalierella elaeidis, described by the same author in the same year, is found in the Democratic Republic of the Congo.
