= Photorhabdus temperata =

Scientific classification
- Domain: Bacteria
- Kingdom: Pseudomonadati
- Phylum: Pseudomonadota
- Class: Gammaproteobacteria
- Order: Enterobacterales
- Family: Morganellaceae
- Genus: Photorhabdus
- Species: P. temperata

Binomial name
- Photorhabdus temperata Fischer-Le Saux et al. 1999

Species of bacterium

Photorhabdus temperata is a species of bacteria. It has been divided into 6 subspecies. It is pathogenic to certain insects.
