= Entomopathogenic nematode =

Group of thread worms that attack insects

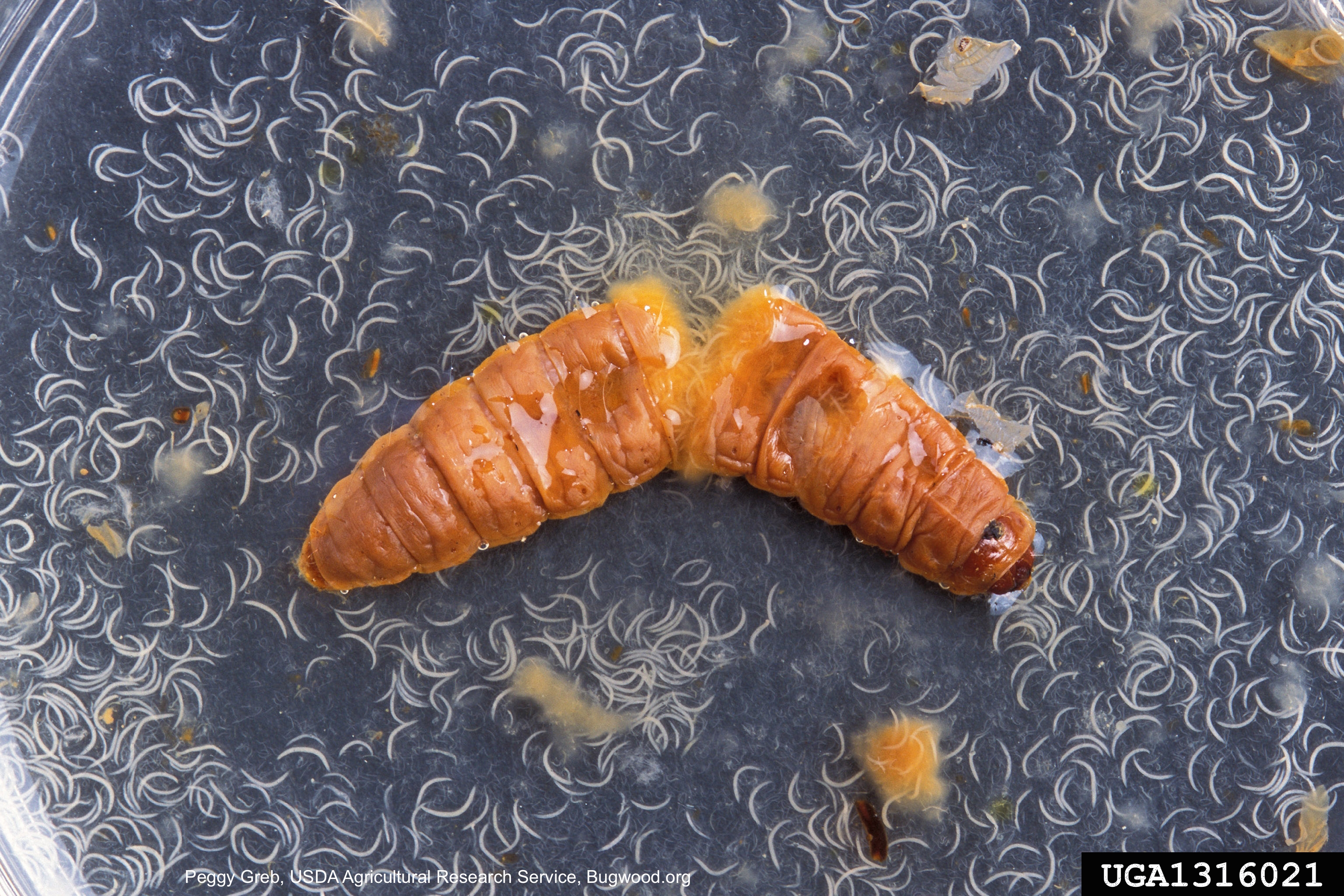
Nematodes emerging from a wax moth larva cadaver

Entomopathogenic nematodes (EPN) are a group of nematodes (thread worms), that cause death to insects. The term entomopathogenic has a Greek origin, with entomon, meaning insect, and pathogenic, which means causing disease. They are animals that occupy a biological control middle ground between microbial pathogens and predator/parasitoids. Although many other parasitic thread worms cause diseases in living organisms (sterilizing or otherwise debilitating their host), entomopathogenic nematodes are specific in only infecting insects. Entomopathogenic nematodes (EPNs) live parasitically inside the infected insect host, and so they are termed as endoparasitic. They infect many different types of insects living in the soil like the larval forms of moths, butterflies, flies and beetles as well as adult forms of beetles, grasshoppers and crickets. EPNs have been found all over the world in a range of ecologically diverse habitats. They are highly diverse, complex and specialized. The most commonly studied entomopathogenic nematodes are those that can be used in the biological control of harmful insects, the members of Steinernematidae and Heterorhabditidae. They are the only insect-parasitic nematodes possessing an optimal balance of biological control attributes.

== Classification ==
Kingdom:	Phylum:	Class:	Order:	Family:	Genus:
Animals	Nematoda (roundworms)	Chromadorea	Rhabditida	Steinernematidae	Steinernema
Animals	Nematoda (roundworms)	Chromadorea	Rhabditida	Heterorhabditidae	Heterorhabditis

== Life cycle ==
Because of their economic importance, the life cycles of the genera belonging to families Heterorhabditidae and Steinernematidae are well studied. Although not closely related, phylogenetically, both share similar life histories (Poinar 1993). The cycle begins with an infective juvenile, whose only function is to seek out and infect new hosts. When a host has been located, the nematodes penetrate into the insect body cavity, usually via natural body openings (mouth, anus, spiracles) or areas of thin cuticle. (Shapiro-Ilan, David I., and Randy Gaugler. "Nematodes.") After entering an insect, infective juveniles release an associated mutualistic bacterium from their gut which multiplies rapidly. These bacteria of the genus Xenorhabdus or Photorhabdus, for steinerernematides and heterorhabditids, respectively—cause host mortality within 24–48 hours. The nematodes provide shelter to the bacteria, which, in return, kill the insect host and provide nutrients to the nematode. Without this mutualism no nematode is able to act as an entomoparasite. Together, the nematodes and bacteria feed on the liquefying host, and reproduce for several generations inside the cadaver maturing through the growth stages of J2-J4 into adults. Steinernematids infective juveniles may become males or females, whereas heterorhabditids develop into self-fertilizing hermaphrodites with later generations producing two sexes. When food resources in the host become scarce, the adults produce new infective juveniles adapted to withstand the outside environment. The life cycles of the EPNs are completed within a few days.(Shapiro-Ilan, David I., and Randy Gaugler. "Nematodes.") After about a week, hundreds of thousands of infective juveniles emerge and leave in search of new hosts, carrying with them an inoculation of mutualistic bacteria, received from the internal host environment (Boemare 2002, Gaugler 2006). Their growth and reproduction depends upon conditions established in the host cadaver by the bacterium. The nematodes bacterium contributes anti-immune proteins to assist in overcoming their host defenses (Shapiro-Ilan, David I., and Randy Gaugler. "Nematodes.").

== Foraging strategies ==
Nematode's nictation

The foraging strategies of entomopathogenic nematodes vary between species, influencing their soil depth distributions and host preferences. Infective juveniles use strategies to find hosts that vary from ambush and cruise foraging (Campbell 1997). In order to ambush prey, some Steinernema species nictate, or raise their bodies off the soil surface so they are better poised to attach to passing insects, which are much larger in size (Campbell and Gaugler 1993). Many Steinernema are able to jump by forming a loop with their bodies that creates stored energy which, when released, propels them through the air (Campbell and Kaya 2000). Recent research has shown that this jumping behavior in Steinernema involves a reversible kink instability mechanism. By forming a closed loop and rapidly releasing stored elastic energy, nematodes such as Steinernema carpocapsae can achieve jumps up to 20 times their body length, enhancing their ability to disperse across complex terrains during host seeking. Other species adopt a cruising strategy and rarely nictate. Instead, they roam through the soil searching for potential hosts. These foraging strategies influence which hosts the nematodes infect. For example, ambush predators such as Steinernema carpocapsae infect more insects on the surface, while cruising predators like Heterorhabditis bacteriophora infect insects that live deep in the soil (Campbell and Gaugler 1993).

== Population ecology ==
=== Competition and coexistence ===
Inside their insect hosts, EPNs experience both intra and interspecific competition. Intraspecific competition takes place among nematodes of the same species when the number of infective juveniles penetrating a host exceeds the amount of resources available. Interspecific competition occurs when different species compete for resources. In both cases, the individual nematodes compete with each other indirectly by consuming the same resource, which reduces their fitness and may result in the local extinction of one species inside the host (Koppenhofer and Kaya 1996). Interference competition, in which species compete directly, can also occur. For example, a steinernematid species that infects a host first usually excludes a heterorhabditid species. The mechanism for this superiority may be antibiotics produced by Xenorhabdus, the symbiotic bacterium of the steinernematid. These antibiotics prevent the symbiotic bacterium of the heterorhabditid from multiplying (Kaya and Koppenhofer1996). In order to avoid competition, some species of infective juveniles are able to judge the quality of a host before penetration. The infective juveniles of S. carpocapsae are repelled by 24-hour-old infections, likely by the smell of their own species' mutualistic bacteria (Grewal et al. 1997).

Interspecific competition between nematode species can also occur in the soil environment outside of hosts. Millar and Barbercheck (2001) showed that the introduced nematode Steinernema riobrave survived and persisted in the environment for up to a year after its release. S. riobrave significantly depressed detection of the endemic nematode H. bacteriophora, but never completely displaced it, even after two years of continued introductions. S. riobrave had no effect on populations of the native nematode, S. carpocapsae, though, which suggests that coexistence is possible. Niche differentiation appears to limit competition between nematodes. Different foraging strategies allow two species to co-exist in the same habitat. Different foraging strategies separate the nematodes in space and enable them to infect different hosts. EPNs also occur in patchy distributions, which may limit their interactions and further support coexistence (Kaya and Koppenhofer 1996).

=== Population distribution ===
Entomopathogenic nematodes are typically found in patchy distributions, which vary in space and time, although the degree of patchiness varies between species (reviewed in Lewis 2002). Factors responsible for this aggregated distribution may include behavior, as well as the spatial and temporal variability of the nematodes natural enemies, like nematode trapping fungus. Nematodes also have limited dispersal ability. Many infective juveniles are produced from a single host which could also produce aggregates. Patchy EPN distributions may also reflect the uneven distribution of host and nutrients in the soil ( Stuart and Gaugler 1994; Campbell et al. 1997, 1998). EPNs may persist as metapopulations, in which local population fragments are highly vulnerable to extinction, and fluctuate asynchronously. The metapopulation as a whole can persist as long as the rate of colonization is greater or equal to the rate of population extinction. The founding of new populations and movement between patches may depend on the movement of infective juveniles or the movement of infected hosts. Recent studies suggest that EPNs may also use non-host animals, such as isopods and earthworms for transport (Eng et al.2005, Shapiro et al. 1993) or can be scavengers (San-Blas and Gowen, 2008).

== Community ecology ==
Parasites can significantly affect their hosts, as well as the structure of the communities to which they and their hosts belong (Minchella and Scott 1991). Entomopathogenic nematodes have the potential to shape the populations of plants and host insects, as well as the species composition of the surrounding animal soil community.

Entomopathogenic nematodes affect populations of their insect hosts by killing and consuming individuals. When more EPNs are added to a field environment, typically at concentrations of 25 inhabitants per hectare (10/acre), the population of host insects measurably decreases (Campbell et al. 1998, Strong et al. 1996). Agriculture exploits this finding, and the inundative release of EPNs can effectively control populations of soil insect pests in citrus, cranberries, turfgrass, and tree fruit. If entomopathogenic nematodes suppress the population of insect root herbivores, they indirectly benefit plants by freeing them from grazing pressure. This is an example of a trophic cascade in which consumers at the top of the food web (nematodes) exert an influence on the abundance of resources (plants) at the bottom. The idea that plants can benefit from the application of their herbivore's enemies is the principle behind biological control. Consequently, much of EPN biological research is driven by agricultural applications.

Examples of the top-down effects of entomopathogenic nematodes are not restricted to agricultural systems. Researchers at the Bodega Marine Laboratory examined the strong top-down effects that naturally occurring EPNs can have on their ecosystem (Strong et al. 1996). In a coastal shrubland food chain the native EPN, Heterorhabditis heplialus, parasitized ghost moth caterpillars, and ghost moth caterpillars consumed the roots of bush lupine. The presence H. heplialus correlated with lower caterpillar numbers and healthier plants. In addition, the researchers observed high mortality of bush lupine in the absence of EPNs. Old aerial photographs over the past 40 years indicated that the stands where nematodes were prevalent had little or no mass die-off of lupine. In stands with low nematode prevalence, however, the photos showed repeated lupine die-offs. These results implied that the nematode, as a natural enemy of the ghost moth caterpillar, protected the plant from damage. The authors even suggested that the interaction was strong enough to affect the population dynamics of bush lupine (Strong et al. 1996).

Not only do entomopathogenic nematodes affect their host insects, they can also change the species composition of the soil community. Many familiar animals like earthworms and insect grubs live in the soil, but smaller invertebrates such as mites, collembolans, and nematodes are also common. Aside from EPNs, the soil ecosystem includes predatory, bacteriovorous, fungivorous and plant parasitic nematode species. Since EPNs are applied in agricultural systems at a rate of 1,000,000 inhabitants per acre (2,500,000/ha), the potential for unintended consequences on the soil ecosystem appears large. EPNs have not had an adverse effect on mite and collembolan populations (Georgis et al. 1991), yet there is strong evidence that they affect the species diversity of other nematodes. In a golf course ecosystem, the application of H. bacteriophora, an introduced nematode, significantly reduced the abundance, species richness, maturity, and diversity of the nematode community (Somaseker et al. 2002). EPNs had no effect on free-living nematodes. However, there was a reduction in the number of genera and abundance of plant-parasitic nematodes, which often remain enclosed within growths on the plant root. The mechanism by which insect parasitic nematodes have an effect on plant parasitic nematodes remains unknown. Although this effect is considered beneficial for agricultural systems where plant parasitic nematodes cause crop damage, it raises the question of what other effects are possible. Future research on the impacts EPNs have on soil communities will lead to greater understanding of these interactions.

In aboveground communities, EPNs have few side effects on other animals. One study reported that Steinernema felidae and Heterorhabditis megidis, when applied in a range of agricultural and natural habitats, had little impact on non-pest arthropods. Some minimal impacts did occur, however, on non-pest species of beetles and flies. Unlike chemical pesticides, EPNs are considered safe for humans and other vertebrates.

== Disturbance ==
Frequent disturbance often perturbs agricultural habitats and the response to disturbance varies among EPN species. In traditional agricultural systems, tilling disturbs the soil ecosystem, affecting biotic and abiotic factors. For example, tilled soils have lower microbial, arthropod, and nematode species diversity (Lupwayi et al. 1998). Tilled soil also has less moisture and higher temperatures. In a study examining the tolerances of different EPN species to tillage, the density of a native nematode, H. bacteriophora, was unaffected by tillage, while the density of an introduced nematode, S. carpocapsae, decreased. The density of a third nematode introduced to the system, Steinernema riobrave, increased with tillage (Millar and Barbercheck 2002). Habitat preferences in temperature and soil depth can partially explain the nematodes' different responses to disturbance. S. carpocapsae prefers to remain near the soil surface and so is more vulnerable to soil disturbance than H. bacteriophora, which forages deeper and can escape the effects of tillage. S. riobrave may have responded well to tillage because it is better at surviving and persisting in hotter and drier conditions created by tillage (Millar and Barbercheck 2002). The data showed that Steinernema sp. found in some Indonesia regions showed high adaptive capability when applied on another region or condition (Anton Muhibuddin, 2008). The response of EPNs to other forms of disturbance is less well defined. Nematodes are not affected by certain pesticides and are able to survive flooding. The effects of natural disturbances such as fire have not been examined.

== Applications ==
Although the biological control industry has acknowledged EPNs since the 1980s, relatively little is understood about their biology in natural and managed ecosystems (Georgis 2002). Nematode-host interactions are poorly understood, and more than half of the natural hosts for recognized Steinernema and Heterorhabditis species remain unknown (Akhurst and Smith 2002). Information is lacking because isolates of naturally infected hosts are rare, so native nematodes are often baited using Galleria mellonella, a lepidopteran that is highly susceptible to parasitic infection. Laboratory studies showing wide host ranges for EPNs were often overestimates, because in a laboratory, contact with a host is assured and environmental conditions are ideal; there are no "ecological barriers" to infection (Kaya and Gaugler 1993, Gaugler et al. 1997). Therefore, the broad host range initially predicted by assay results has not always translated into insecticidal success.

Nematodes are open to mass production and don't require specialized application equipment since they are compatible with standard agrochemical equipment, including various sprayers (i.e. backpack, pressurized, mist, electrostatic, fan and aerial) and irrigation systems (Cranshaw, & Zimmerman 2013).

The lack of knowledge about nematode ecology has resulted in unanticipated failures to control pests in the field. For example, parasitic nematodes were found to be completely ineffective against blackflies and mosquitoes due to their inability to swim. Efforts to control foliage-feeding pests with EPNs were equally unsuccessful, because nematodes are highly sensitive to UV light and desiccation. Comparing the life histories of nematodes and target pests can often explain such failures (Gaugler et al. 1997). Each nematode species has a unique array of characteristics, including different environmental tolerances, dispersal tendencies, and foraging behaviors. Increased knowledge about the factors that influence EPN populations and the impacts they have in their communities will likely increase their efficacy as biological control agents.

Recently, studies have shown utilizing both EPNs (steinernematids and heterorhabditids) in combination for biological control of plum curculio in orchards in Northeast America have reduced populations by as much as 70–90% in the field, depending on insect stage, treatment timing and field conditions. More studies are being conducted for the efficacy of EPNs utilized as a biological control agent for organic growers as an alternative solution to chemistries that aren't as effective at controlling insect infestations.(Agnello, Jentsch, Shield, Testa, and Keller 2014).

== See also ==
- Biological insecticides
- Entomopathogenic fungus
