= Heterorhabditis indica =

Scientific classification
- Domain: Eukaryota
- Kingdom: Animalia
- Phylum: Nematoda
- Class: Chromadorea
- Order: Rhabditida
- Family: Heterorhabditidae
- Genus: Heterorhabditis
- Species: H. indica

Binomial name
- Heterorhabditis indica Poinar, Karunakar & David, 1992

Synonyms
- Heterorhabditis indicus

Species of roundworm

Heterorhabditis indica is a nematode species in the genus Heterorhabditis.
