= Achroia innotata =

Scientific classification
- Kingdom: Animalia
- Phylum: Arthropoda
- Clade: Pancrustacea
- Class: Insecta
- Order: Lepidoptera
- Family: Pyralidae
- Genus: Achroia
- Species: A. innotata

Binomial name
- Achroia innotata (Walker, 1864)

Synonyms
- Vobrix innotata Walker, 1864

Species of moth

Achroia innotata is a species of snout moth, known from Sarawak, Malaysia, Sri Lanka and South Africa. It was described by Francis Walker in 1864.

The larvae infest beehives, including those of Apis cerana.

== Subspecies ==
- Achroia innotata innotata
- Achroia innotata lankella
- Achroia innotata sakaiella
