= Shallow water fishing =

Type of fishing

Shallow water fishing is one type of the many types of fishing. Shallow can mean many different things; shallow lakes, shallow rivers, and most common to fishermen is the shallow ponds with high concentrations of moss. There are many different baits and fishing lures for shallow water fishing such as.
