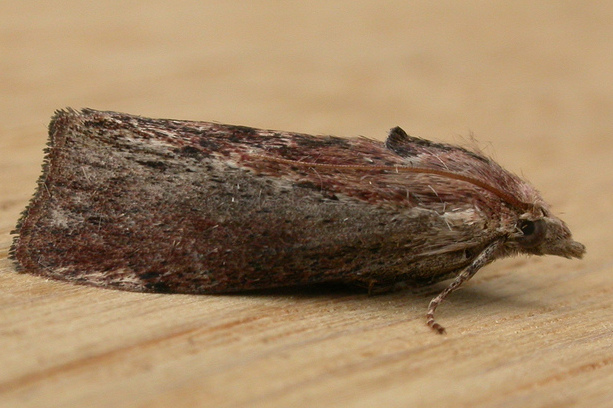
- Galleria mellonella adult

Scientific classification
- Kingdom: Animalia
- Phylum: Arthropoda
- Clade: Pancrustacea
- Class: Insecta
- Order: Lepidoptera
- Family: Pyralidae
- Subfamily: Galleriinae
- Genus: Galleria; Fabricius, 1798

Synonyms
- "Adeona" Rafinesque, 1815 (nomen nudum); Cerioclepta Sodoffsky, 1837; Vindana Walker, 1866

= Galleria (moth) =

Genus of moths

Galleria is a genus of snout moths in the subfamily Galleriinae of the family Pyralidae. The genus was erected by Johan Christian Fabricius in 1798.

For a long time, Galleria remained a monotypic taxon, comprising only one species, until in 2020 a second species was described from South Korea.

== Species ==
Galleria currently comprises two species:

- Galleria mellonella (Linnaeus, 1758)
- Galleria similis Roh & Song in Roh et al., 2020
