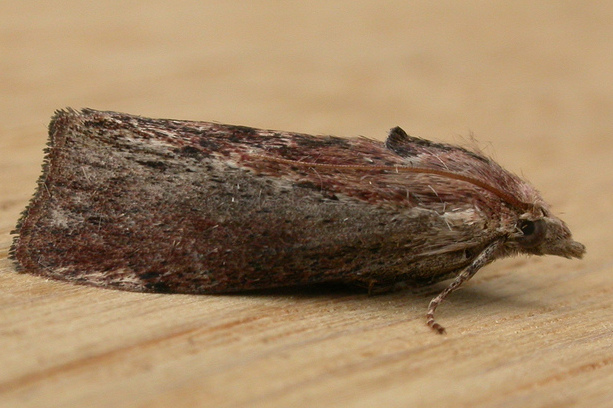
- Adult

Scientific classification
- Kingdom: Animalia
- Phylum: Arthropoda
- Clade: Pancrustacea
- Class: Insecta
- Order: Lepidoptera
- Family: Pyralidae
- Subfamily: Galleriinae
- Genus: Galleria
- Species: G. mellonella

Binomial name
- Galleria mellonella (Linnaeus, 1758)

Synonyms
- Numerous, see text

= Galleria mellonella =

Species of moth

Galleria mellonella, the greater wax moth or honeycomb moth, is a moth of the family Pyralidae. G. mellonella is found throughout the world. It is one of two species of wax moths, with the other being the lesser wax moth. G. mellonella eggs are laid in the spring, and they have four life stages. Males are able to generate ultrasonic sound pulses, which, along with pheromones, are used in mating. The larvae of G. mellonella are also often used as a model organism in research.

The greater wax moth is well known for its parasitization of honeybees and their hives. Because of the economic loss caused by this species, several control methods including heat treatment and chemical fumigants such as carbon dioxide have been used.

The caterpillar of G. mellonella has attracted interest for its ability to degrade polyethylene plastic.

== Geographic range ==
G. mellonella was first reported as a pest in Asia, but then spread to northern Africa, Great Britain, some parts of Europe, northern America, and New Zealand. The species is now distributed throughout the globe. It has been reported in twenty-seven African countries, nine Asian countries, four North American countries, three Latin American countries, Australia, ten European countries, and five island countries. It is projected that the pest may spread further, especially due to climate change.

== Habitat ==
G. mellonella can be found where honeybees are cultivated.

== Food resources ==
=== Larvae ===
G. mellonella larvae feed in hives of social bees and wasps. Eggs are laid in the cracks and crevices inside the hive, which minimizes egg detection. Once eggs hatch, the larvae feed on the midrib of the wax comb, the cast skins of larvae, pollen, and small quantities of propolis and honey. They never eat larvae.

== Parental care ==
=== Oviposition ===
Shortly after emergence, G. mellonella females lay their eggs in the small cracks and crevices inside a beehive. Females prefer to lay their eggs in strong, healthy bee colonies over weaker colonies, but weaker colonies have a higher rate of G. mellonella infestation. Eggs are laid in clusters of varying number depending on the region. Clusters of 50-150 eggs have been reported in the United States, whereas clusters of 300-600 eggs have commonly been reported in India. Up to 1800 eggs have been deposited by a single female.

== Life history ==
The life cycle of G. mellonella proceeds through four stages: egg, larvae, pupae and adult. Generally, eggs are laid in the early spring and the moth undergoes four to six generations annually. By December, the eggs, larvae, and pupae enter diapause in wait for warmer weather.

=== Factors that can affect length of life stages ===
The effects of temperature and humidity on life stages have been most thoroughly studied. Temperatures around 29–33 °C (84–91 °F) and humidity levels around 29-33% are optimal for development, though studies in Kansas have shown normal larval development at temperatures as high as 37 °C (99 °F). Average temperatures higher than 45 °C (113 °F) have been shown to be lethal for larva. Lower temperatures at 23 °C (73 °F), however, resulted in only part of the life cycle being completed. At temperatures below 0 °C (32 °F), even short exposures kill larva and adults.

Intraspecific factors also affect life stages: cannibalism of instars in the process of moulting has been seen, though only in situations where food is scarce. Diet quality also can affect larva development; nutrient deprived larvae are more susceptible to infection by the yeast Candida albicans.

=== Egg ===
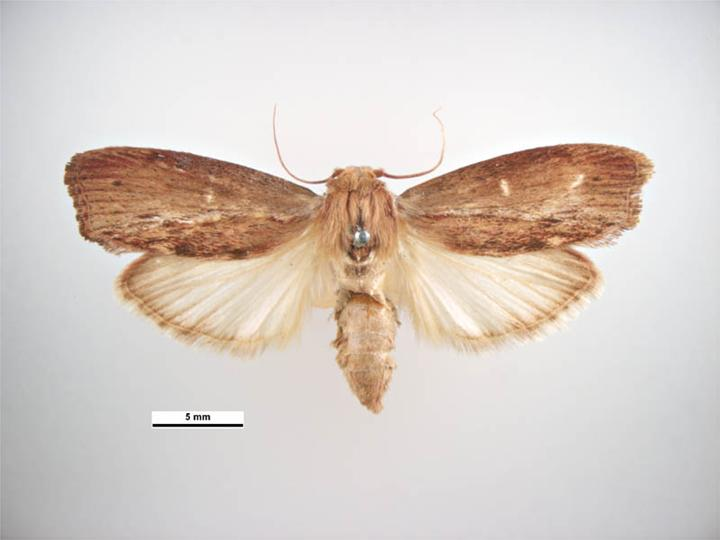
Mounted, dorsal view

Eggs are smooth and spherical in appearance, with a size ranging from 0.4 to 0.5 mm. Coloring ranges from pink to cream to white. They are laid in clusters in small cracks and crevices in the hive, and can take anytime from 7.2 to 21.8 days to hatch.

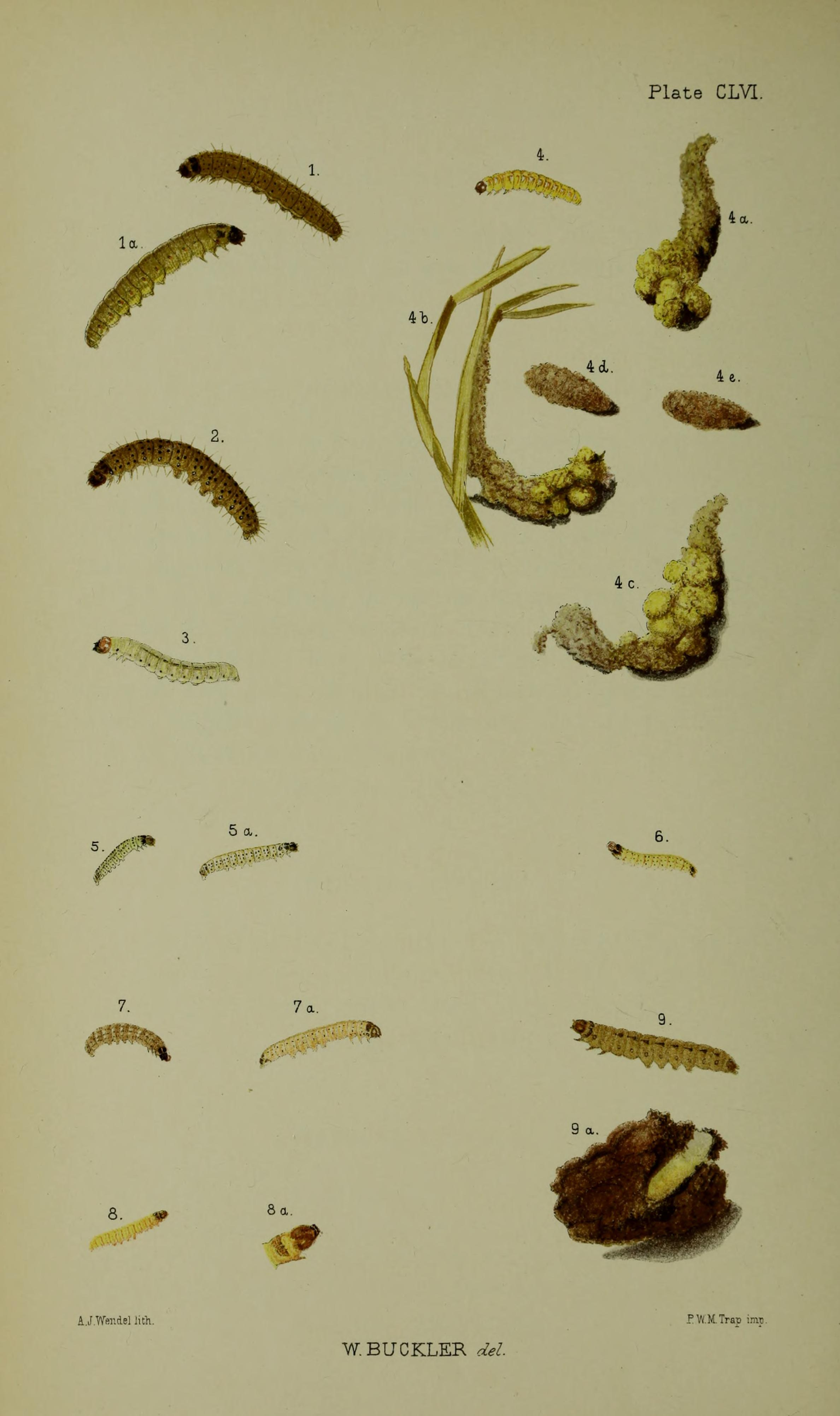
Figs.1 larva after final moult on hive wax, 1a several larvae with a mass of cocoons amongst hive wax

=== Larvae ===
Larva range in size from 3 to 30 mm long, and are white or dirty gray color. They feed on honey, pollen, cast off skin of honeybee larvae, and the midrib of the wax comb; cannibalism has also been observed in food shortages. Less often, they are found in bumblebee and wasp nests, or feeding on dried figs. Feeding is more intense during earlier instars compared to later instars. They can remain in the larval stage anywhere between 28 days to 6 months, during which they undergo eight to ten molting stages. While silk is spun during all stages, at the last instar the larvae spins a cocoon of silk for itself and enters the pupal stage.

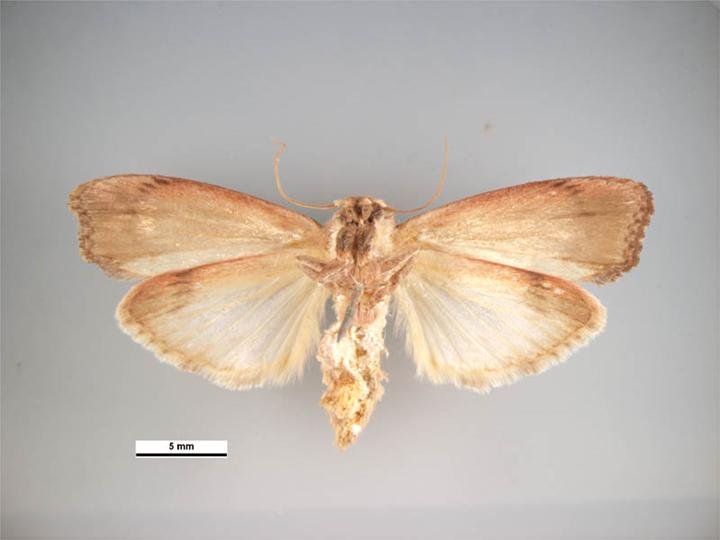
Mounted, ventral view

=== Pupae ===
Pupae are immobile, do not feed, and remain housed in their cocoon for 1 to 9 weeks until emerging as adults. Size ranges from 14 to 16 mm. Pupae start off as a brownish white, but gradually darken to a dark brown color just before adults are ready to emerge.

=== Adult ===
Adult moths are brown gray and range from 10 to 18 mm in length. The adults' wingspan is 30 to 41 mm.Meyrick describes it - Forewings brown, suffusedly irrorated with ashy-whitish, especially on costal half towards base, and sprinkled with black, dorsal area much mixed with whitish-ochreous or ferruginous; some tufts of raised scales on fold; first and second lines angulated, faint, towards dorsum marked with short blackish dashes on veins and small dorsal spots, first sometimes almost obsolete. Hindwings in male pale fuscous, becoming dark posteriorly, in female fuscous-whitish, terminally fuscous. Larva pale dull grey; head and plate of 2 dark reddish-brown : in old honeycombs in beehives; 5-8.

This moth flies from May to October in the temperate parts of its range, such as Belgium and the Netherlands. Females are larger and heavier than males, and possess a characteristic beaklike head. The outer margin of the forewing is smooth and the labial palp is extended forwards. Males are identified by the semilunar notch. Females live for an average of 12 days; males live for an average of 21 days.

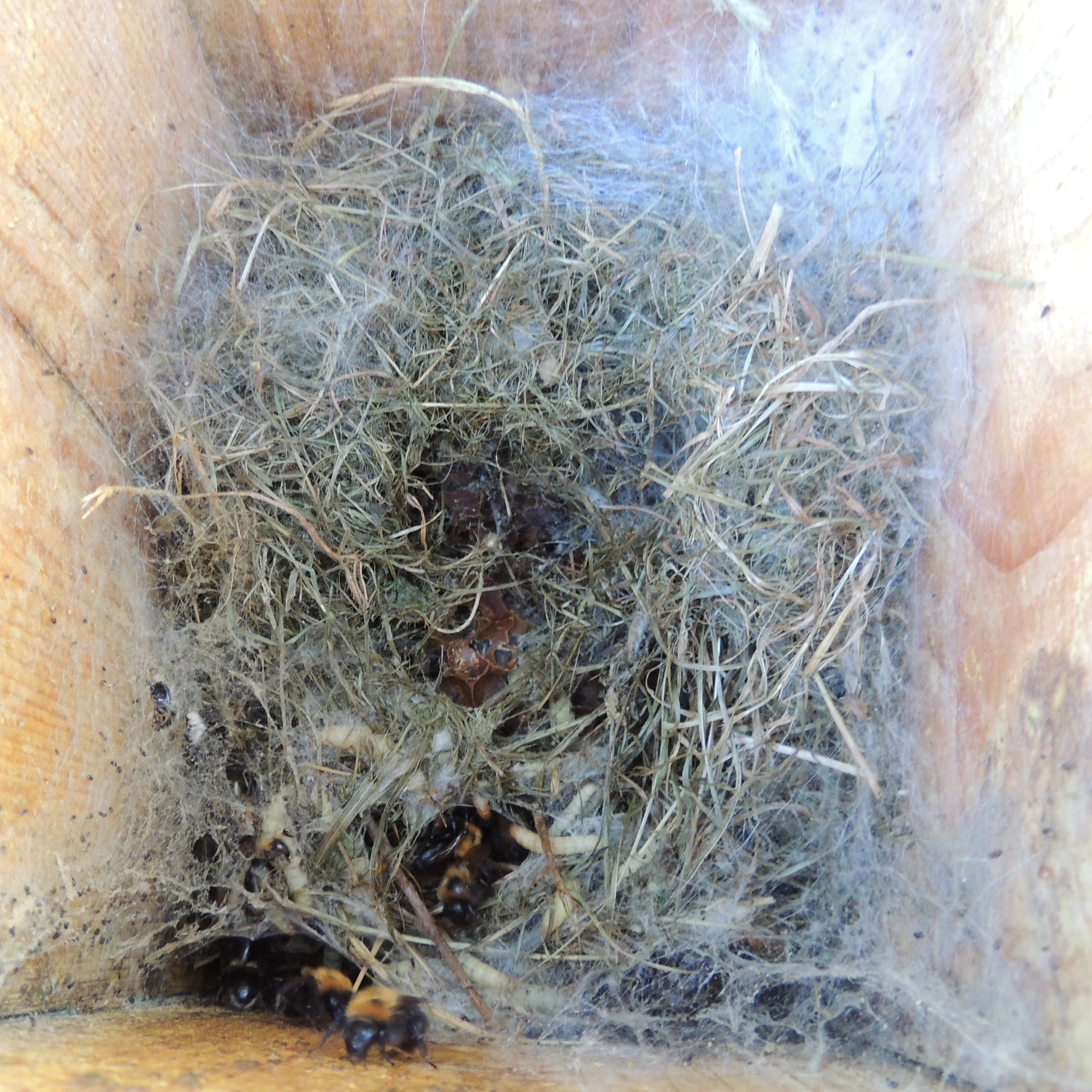
Silk trails left by larvae in a bumblebee nest in a bird box.

== Host ==
Galleria mellonella larvae parasitize wild honeybees. Eggs are laid within the hive, and the larva that hatch tunnel through the honeycombs that contain honeybee larva and their honey stores. The tunnels they create are lined with silk, which entangles and starves emerging bees, a phenomenon known as galleriasis. Tunnels also result in massive destruction of the combs. As a result, honey is wasted as it leaks out when cell caps are eaten. Finally, both G. mellonella adults and larvae can be vectors for pathogens that can infect honeybees, including the Israeli acute paralysis virus (IAPV) and the black queen cell virus (BQCV).

== Enemies ==
=== Parasites ===
Apanteles galleriae parasitizes G. mellonella larva inside the beehive. 1-2 eggs, laid by the adult Apanteles galleriae, were found on each larva, with only one successfully parasitizing the host and surviving throughout its life cycle. The parasite emerges and ruptures the host body, and pupates into a small cocoon. Parasitism increases gradually, starting in February, reaching its peak in May, then declining until July. However, it is unlikely that this parasite will take root in a strong, healthy colony as they will be kept out of the hive by bees. Even if they are able to enter the hive, it is difficult to navigate through the darkness in order to find their host.

Habrobracon hebetor also parasitizes G. mellonella adults, along with other members of the family Pyralidae. It uses male-secreted sex pheromones to locate its host.

== Mating ==
Males call for females with ultrasonic sound pulses that attract virgin females and initiate courtship Once females get closer, males produce a sex pheromone to initiate mating. There are many known kinds of sex pheromone including nonanal, decanal, hexanal, heptanal, undecanal, 6,10,14 trimethylpentacanol-2 and 5,11-dimethylpentacosane. It is also known that these pheromones are often used to create traps to attract females. However, as traps baited with these pheromones do not attract virgin females over long distances, acoustics have to be used to draw females in first.

== Physiology ==
=== Sound generation ===
Males generate ultrasonic sound pulses at 75 kHz, 200μs per pulse that are used to attract females for mating. This is generated by twisting an end of the tymbal, the membrane that produces sound in insects, with the wings. This causes the tymbal to buckle and results in the emission of an ultrasonic pulse. However, isolated males will not generate sound, thus stimulation from other wax moths is required. Females respond to these pulses by fanning their wings, resulting in 40 and 80 Hz wingbeat frequencies that are detected by the males; which then produces sex pheromones so the female can find him.

=== Hearing organs ===
Both sexes are equipped with a sensitive tympanic hearing organ that allows the great wax worm to perceive high frequency sound. This likely resulted from selective pressure from insectivorous bats; being able to detect their echolocation would enable G. mellonella to avoid being eaten. Female tympanic membranes are 0.65 mm across; males' are 0.55 mm across. They are located on the ventral side of the first abdominal segment.

Emitters that produced ultrasonic sounds at similar frequencies as echolocation prompted G. mellonella to tilt their head and then exhibit dropping, looping, and freezing behaviors, all of which are meant to evade predators. The head tilt was a direct response to sound reception; once tympanic hearing organs were destroyed, this response was lost. Notably, predator evading behaviors were not exhibited when G. mellonella was exposed to lower frequency ultrasounds of moderate intensity.

G. mellonella seems to be able to differentiate between different frequencies and pulsing patterns. It has been hypothesized that G. mellonella use the 30–100 Hz range for communication with other members of its species. This is an ideal frequency as honeybees, its host, generally do not produce sound in this range.

== Interactions with humans ==
=== Beekeeping ===
This species of moth is a major parasite of the wild and cultivated honey bee, costing millions of dollars of damage each year. It is said to be present in any area where beekeeping is practiced. After eggs are laid in the hive, the larvae burrow through the honeycombs and cause massive destruction, in addition to trapping emergent bees. Measures have been developed to prevent and manage infestations, but many have unresolved downsides.

=== Lab and pet food source ===
Wax moth larvae are commonly raised and sold as food for captive reptiles and arthropods.

=== Management ===
G. mellonella causes massive economic losses in the honeybee cultivation industry; the Southern U.S. loses 4-5% of its profits per year due to this one pest. In order to prevent or manage infestations, cultivators are encouraged to maintain sanitary conditions for their bees, as it will keep the colony strong so they can keep G. mellonella out. Cracks and crevices should also be sealed so that adult G. mellonella cannot lay their eggs there. Combs should be replaced regularly and infested combs should be removed as soon as possible.

Temperature treatments also destroy G. mellonella at all stages of its life cycle. Heat treatment keeps the combs and beekeeping equipment at 45-80 °C for 1–4 hours, or in hot water for 3–5 hours. However, heating at this temperature can cause sagging and distortion of the wax. Cold treatment cools the combs to -15 to -7 °C for 2-4.5 hours.

Chemical fumigants also destroy all stages of G. mellonella and are economically convenient. At present, only CO_{2} is approved to treat infested colonies, because other chemicals leave residues that make their way into the honey produced and pose risks for the person treating the hive.

Usage of gamma radiation to sterilize male pupae, or the male sterilization technique (MST), has also been used to control Galleria mellonella populations. 350 Gy of ionizing radiation was found to be most effective, and a ratio of 4 sterilized males to 1 normal male to 1 female resulted in the greatest decrease of hatched eggs and larvae that became pupae.

== In research ==
The waxworms of the greater wax moth have been shown to be an excellent model organism for in vivo toxicology and pathogenicity testing, replacing the use of small mammals in such experiments. The larvae are also well-suited models for studying the innate immune system. In genetics, they can be used to study inherited sterility (cellular and humoral immunity are part of acquired immunity, which is only in vertebrates. Insects only have innate immunity).

Experiments with infected waxworms support the hypothesis that the bacterial stilbenoid 3,5-Dihydroxy-4-isopropyl-trans-stilbene has antibiotic properties that help minimize competition from other microorganisms and prevents the putrefaction of the insect cadaver infected by the entomopathogenic nematode Heterorhabditis, itself host for the Photorhabdus bacterium.

Galleria mellonella is reported to be capable of hearing ultrasonic frequencies approaching 300 kHz, possibly the highest frequency sensitivity of any animal.

In 2017 it was shown that the larvae could degrade polyethylene. The larvae's saliva can oxidize and depolymerize polyethylene at room temperature and neutral pH within hours. Polyethylene is one of the most difficult plastics to break down. Investigations underway to determine if these enzymes can be used to biodegrade plastic waste.

Another closely related species of waxworm, Plodia interpunctella, has been the subject of research which isolated two strains of bacteria from its gut, Enterobacter asburiae and Bacillus species which have been demonstrated as capable of growing on and decomposing polyethylene plastic in a laboratory setting.

== Synonyms ==
As a widespread and somewhat notorious species, the greater wax moth has been described under a number of now-invalid junior synonyms:

- Phalaena mellonella L., 1758
- Galleria mellomella (lapsus)
- Galleria austrinia C. Felder, R. Felder & Rogenhofer, 1875
- Vindana obliquella Walker, 1866
- Phalaena cereana Blom, 1764
- Tinea cerella Fabricius, 1775 (unjustified emendation of cereana)
- Tinea cerea Haworth, 1811 (unjustified emendation of cereana)
- Galleria cerealis Hübner, 1825 (unjustified emendation of cereana)
- Galleria mellonella ab. crombrugheella Dufrane, 1930
- Galleria crombrugheela (lapsus)

== See also ==
- Ideonella sakaiensis - a bacterium capable of breaking down polyethylene terephthalate
- Pestalotiopsis microspora - a fungus capable of breaking down polyurethane

== Literature ==
- Grabe, Albert (1942). Eigenartige Geschmacksrichtungen bei Kleinschmetterlingsraupen ["Strange tastes among micromoth caterpillars"]. Zeitschrift des Wiener Entomologen-Vereins 27: 105-109 [in German]. PDF fulltext
- Savela, Markku (2009). Markku Savela's Lepidoptera and some other life forms – Galleria mellonella. Version of 2009-APR-07. Retrieved 2010-APR-11.
