= Photorhabdus =

Scientific classification
- Domain: Bacteria
- Kingdom: Pseudomonadati
- Phylum: Pseudomonadota
- Class: Gammaproteobacteria
- Order: Enterobacterales
- Family: Morganellaceae
- Genus: Photorhabdus (Boemare et al. 1993) emend. Fischer-Le Saux et al. 1999

Species
- Photorhabdus asymbiotica; Photorhabdus luminescens; Photorhabdus temperata

Genus of bacteria

Photorhabdus is a genus of bioluminescent, gram-negative bacilli which lives symbiotically within entomopathogenic nematodes, hence the name photo (which means light producing) and rhabdus (rod shape). Photorhabdus is known to be pathogenic to a wide range of insects and has been used as biopesticide in agriculture.

== Life cycle ==
Photorhabdus species facilitate the reproduction of entomopathogenic nematodes by infecting and killing susceptible insect larvae. Entomopathogenic nematodes are normally found in soil. Nematodes infect larval hosts by piercing the larval cuticle. When the nematode enters an insect larvae, Photorhabdus species are released by the nematodes and will produce a range of toxins, killing the host within 48 hours. Photorhabdus species feed on the cadaver of the insect and the process converts the cadaver into a nutrient source for the nematode. Mature nematodes leave the depleted body of the insect and search for new hosts to infect.

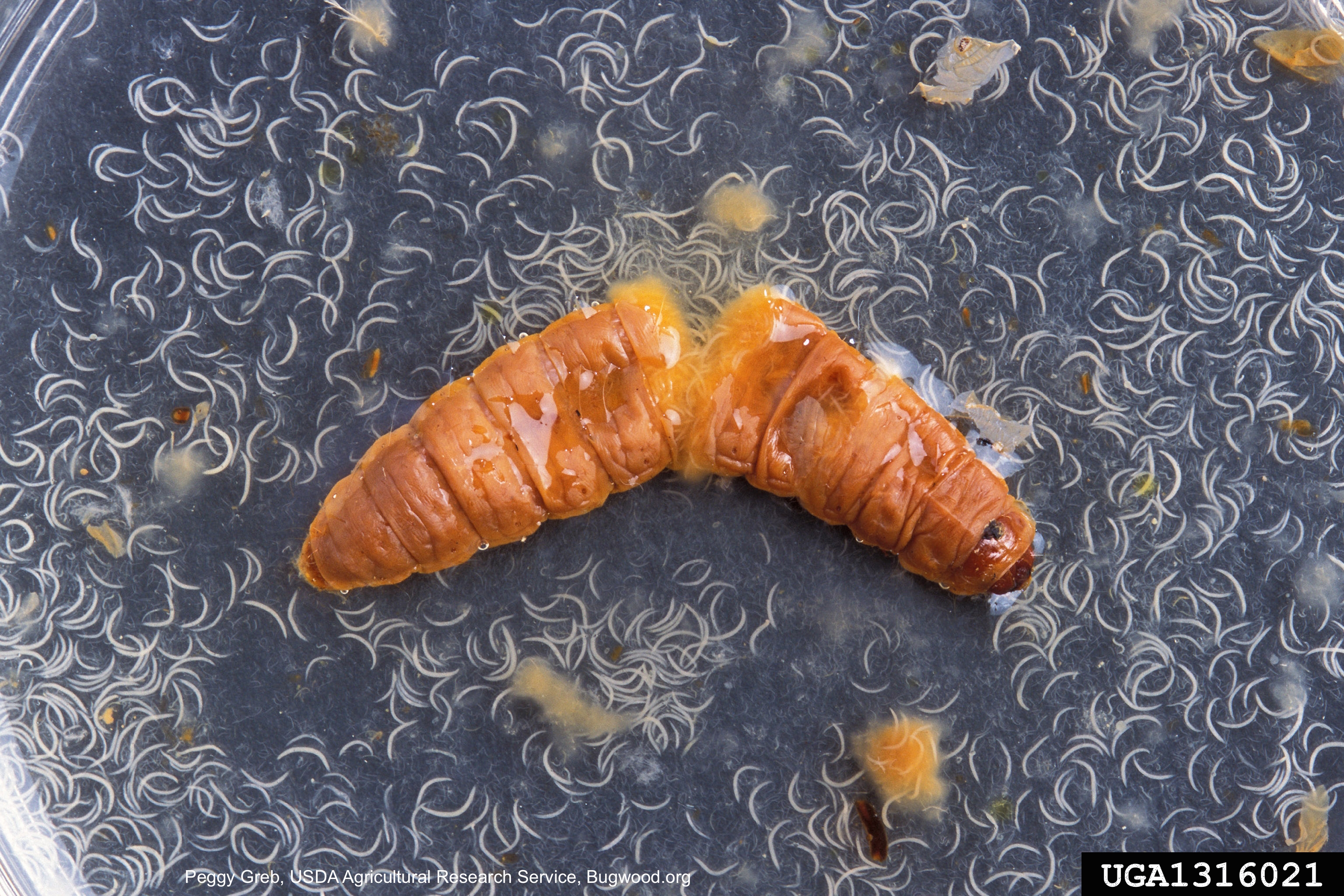
Entomopathogenic nematodes emerging from a wax moth cadaver

During stationary phase growth inside insect larvae, Photorhabdus species synthesize a molecule called 3,5-Dihydroxy-4-isopropyl-trans-stilbene (ST). It is proposed that ST acts as an antibiotic and protects Photorhabdus species from competition from other microorganisms, and also helps circumvent the insect's immune system.

3,5-Dihydroxy-4-isopropyl-trans-stilbene（ST）

Photorhabdus species are essential endosymbionts for Heterorhabditis nematodes.

== Genome sequence ==
The complete genome of Photorhabdus luminescens was sequenced in 2003. The DNA sequence of Photorhabdus contains a number of toxin-encoding genes that are essential for killing the insect after infection. This includes genes encoding toxins that kill Manduca sexta, the tobacco hornworm, gene mcf that causes apoptosis in insect hemocytes and midgut epithelium, and genes that intervene in the development of insect host.

Another important sequence identified is the gene encoding polyketide and nonribosomal peptide syntheses which produce antibiotics to protect against microbial competitors.

It is proposed that Photorhabdus species acquired the toxin genes by horizontal gene transfer during evolution.

== In agriculture ==
The efficiency of insect-killing nature of Photorhabdus species and its potential use as biopesticide have been studied. Use of Photorhabdus species alone as biopesticide, independent of its nematode symbiont, against the cabbage white butterfly, Pieris brassicae, mango mealy bug, Drosicha mangiferae and the pupae of the diamond back moth, Plutella xylostella has been demonstrated successful. It also has the pathogenic potential to kill the Asian corn borer, a pest of maize in east Asia, in 48 hours.

== As disease-causing agent ==
Three species of Photohabdus have been found, which are Photorhabdus luminescens, Photorhabdus temperata and Photorhabdus asymbiotica. P. asymbiotica has been shown to be infectious to human, but the cases are mostly non-fatal and are restricted to the US state of Texas and the Gold Coast of Australia.

The first case of human infection was reported by the Centers for Disease Control in the United States in 1989.

In 1999, a study reported another four cases of Photorhabdus luminescens infection in south eastern Australia, one in 1994 and three in 1998.
