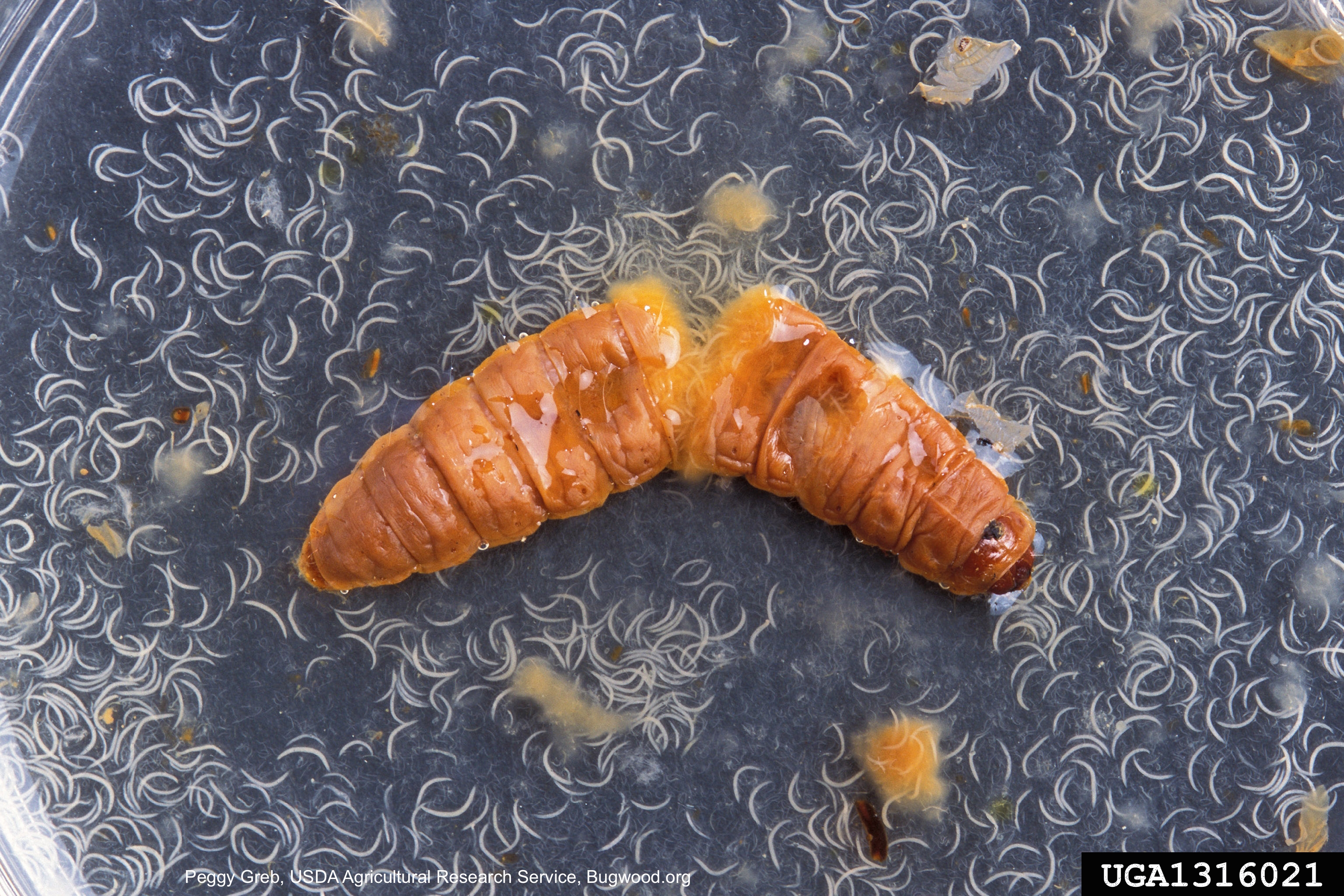
- Heterorhabditis bacteriophora nematodes emerging from a greater wax moth.

Scientific classification
- Domain: Eukaryota
- Kingdom: Animalia
- Phylum: Nematoda
- Class: Chromadorea
- Order: Rhabditida
- Family: Heterorhabditidae
- Genus: Heterorhabditis; Poinar, 1976

= Heterorhabditis =

Genus of roundworms

Heterorhabditis is a genus of nematodes belonging to the order Rhabditida. All species of this genus are obligate parasites of insects, and some are used as biological control agents for the control of pest insects.

Heterorhabditis nematodes are hosts for the Photorhabdus bacterial symbiont.

== Species ==
The recognized species in this genus are:

- Heterorhabditis amazonensis Andaló, Nguyen & Moino, 2007
- Heterorhabditis bacteriophora Poinar, 1976
- Heterorhabditis baujardi Phan, Subbotin, Nguyen & Moens, 2003
- Heterorhabditis downesi Stock, Griffin & Burnell, 2002
- Heterorhabditis floridensis Nguyen, Gozel, Koppenhöfer & Adams, 2006
- Heterorhabditis georgiana Nguyen, Shapiro-Ilan and Mbata, 2008
- Heterorhabditis heliothidis (Khan, Brooks & Hirschmann, 1976)
- Heterorhabditis indica Poinar, Karunakar & David, 1992
- Heterorhabditis marelatus Liu & Berry, 1996
- Heterorhabditis megidis Poinar, Jackson & Klein, 1987
- Heterorhabditis mexicana Nguyen, Shapiro-Ilan, Stuart, McCoy, James & Adams, 2004
- Heterorhabditis safricana Malan, Nguyen, de Waal and Tiedt, 2008
- Heterorhabditis taysearae Shamseldean, El-Sooud, Abd-Elgawad & Saleh, 1996
- Heterorhabditis zealandica Poinar, 1990
