= Corcyra (disambiguation) =

Corcyra is Latin for Corfu, a Greek island in the Ionian Sea.

Corcyra or Korkyra may also refer to:

- Korkyra (mythology), a mythical figure whose name was given to the Greek island

== Places ==
- Corcyra (polis), the ancient city on the island of Corfu
- Corcyra (Acarnania), a city founded in ancient Acarnania by Corinthians in 706 BC. See List of cities in ancient Acarnania
- Corcyre, a former French department (1797–1799) in present Greece
- Corcyra Nigra or Korkyra Melaina, ancient name of Korčula island, in Croatia, also known as Black Corcyra

== Insects ==
- Corcyra cephalonica, the rice moth
- Corcyra nidicolella, a type of snout moth
- Corcyra brunnea, a type of snout moth
- Corcyra, a type of snout moth
- Corcyra asthenitis, a type of snout moth
- Corcyranillus, a genus of beetles

== Horses ==
- Corcyra, one of the UK's top stallions, a sire of Cleopatra
