= Corfu (disambiguation) =

Corfu (Greek: Κέρκυρα, Kerkyra) is a major island in Greece.

Corfu, Kerkyra, Korkyra or Corcyra may also refer to:

== Places ==
- Corfu, a major island in Greece
  - Corfu (city), the capital city of the island
  - Corfu (constituency), an electoral district
  - Corfu (regional unit), an administrative unit created in 2011
  - Corfu Prefecture, a former administrative unit (1864–2010)
  - Corfu Province, a former administrative unit (1864–2006)
  - Corcyre, a former French department (1797–1799)
  - Korkyra (polis), the ancient city which preceded Corfu
- Corfu, New York, a village in the United States
- Corfu, Washington, an unincorporated community
- Corfu Slide, a geological formation in the United States
- Corcyra Nigra or Korkyra Melaina, ancient name of Korčula island, in Croatia
  - Korčula (town), on the island

=== Ecclesiastical sees ===
- Metropolis of Corfu, Paxoi and the Diapontian Islands, an Eastern Orthodox see, part of the Church of Greece
- Roman Catholic Archdiocese of Corfu, Zakynthos, and Cephalonia

== People ==
- Korkyra (mythology), nymph associated with the island
- Saint Kerkyra, Christian martyr of the 1st century, daughter of the Roman governor of Corfu
- Haim Corfu (1921–2015), Israeli politician
- Robert Corfou (born 1942), French football manager

== Ships ==
- Three warships of the Hellenic Navy have worn this name:
  - Greek steamboat Kerkyra, customs steamboat (1885–1897)
  - Greek minesweeper Kerkyra (M-208) (1943–1973), former BYMS-2172 minesweeper of the Royal Navy, sold to the Hellenic Navy in 1946
  - Greek hovercraft Kerkyra (L-182) (built 2004), Zubr-class LCAC
- RMS Corfu (1931–1961), British ocean liner
- Corfu Diamond, ferry, name of MV Avrasya (1953–1997) during part of her life
- Russian destroyer Corfu (1915–1956), Russian, Soviet & Bulgarian Fidonisy-class destroyer

== Other ==
- Corcyra (moth), a genus of snout moth

== See also ==
- Siege of Corfu (disambiguation)
- Corcyra (disambiguation)
