= Aphomia grisea =

Scientific classification
- Domain: Eukaryota
- Kingdom: Animalia
- Phylum: Arthropoda
- Class: Insecta
- Order: Lepidoptera
- Family: Pyralidae
- Genus: Aphomia
- Species: A. grisea

Binomial name
- Aphomia grisea Turati, 1913

Species of moth

Aphomia grisea is a species of snout moth in the genus Aphomia. It was described by Turati in 1913, and is known from Sardinia.

== Taxonomy ==
It is sometimes listed as a synonym of Aphomia sociella.
