= Procometis lipara =

Scientific classification
- Domain: Eukaryota
- Kingdom: Animalia
- Phylum: Arthropoda
- Class: Insecta
- Order: Lepidoptera
- Family: Autostichidae
- Genus: Procometis
- Species: P. lipara

Binomial name
- Procometis lipara Meyrick, 1890

Species of moth

Procometis lipara is a moth in the family Autostichidae. It was described by Edward Meyrick in 1890. It is found in Australia, where it has been recorded from New South Wales.

The wingspan is 17–22 mm. The forewings are rather dark fuscous with a pale ochreous-yellowish or whitish ochreous rather irregular suffused streak along the costa from the base to the apex, leaving the costal edge dark fuscous on the anterior half. There is a similar median streak from the base to two-thirds, sometimes dilated so as to coalesce more or less entirely with the costal. Some whitish-ochreous scales are found towards the hindmargin beneath the apex, sometimes forming a small suffusion, or increased so as to coalesce with the apex of the median streak. The hindwings are rather dark fuscous grey.
