= Aphomia lolotialis =

Scientific classification
- Domain: Eukaryota
- Kingdom: Animalia
- Phylum: Arthropoda
- Class: Insecta
- Order: Lepidoptera
- Family: Pyralidae
- Genus: Aphomia
- Species: A. lolotialis

Binomial name
- Aphomia lolotialis (Caradja, 1927)

Synonyms
- Melissoblaptes lolotialis Caradja, 1927

Species of moth

Aphomia lolotialis is a species of snout moth in the genus Aphomia. It was described by Aristide Caradja in 1927 and is known from China.
