= Procometis oxypora =

Scientific classification
- Domain: Eukaryota
- Kingdom: Animalia
- Phylum: Arthropoda
- Class: Insecta
- Order: Lepidoptera
- Family: Autostichidae
- Genus: Procometis
- Species: P. oxypora

Binomial name
- Procometis oxypora Meyrick, 1908

Synonyms
- Procometis (Hyostola) oxypora

Species of moth

Procometis oxypora is a moth of the family Autostichidae. It is endemic to KwaZulu-Natal and Gauteng in South Africa.

== Description ==
The species is 33 millimetres (1.3 in) long and has an ochreous head and thorax. Its antennae are white while its forewings are elongate and quite narrow. The leading edge of the wing is moderately arched while its termen is oblique, sinuate, ochre yellowish and located right before the costa. Hindwings are smaller than the forewings and have quite long cilium which are light ochreous yellow. Its hair-pencil is large and is the same colour as the costa with the apex right next to it. The apex itself is grey and is white closer to the base.
