= Procometis acharma =

Scientific classification
- Kingdom: Animalia
- Phylum: Arthropoda
- Clade: Pancrustacea
- Class: Insecta
- Order: Lepidoptera
- Family: Autostichidae
- Genus: Procometis
- Species: P. acharma

Binomial name
- Procometis acharma Meyrick, 1908

Synonyms
- Procometis (Hyostoma) acharma

Species of moth

Procometis acharma is a moth of the family Oecophoridae. It is found in South Africa (KwaZulu-Natal), the Democratic Republic of the Congo (Katanga) and Kenya.

== Description ==
The wingspan is 32 millimetres (1.3 in) for males and 46 millimetres (1.8 in) for females. It has an ochreous-brownish head and thorax with its pedipalp being hairy on top. Its antennae are whitish ochreous, while its abdomen is ochreous grey. The species has elongate and narrow forewings which are arched in males but are round in females. The termen is straight and obtuse in males, but it is oblique and rounded in females. Both sexes have black scales, which are located on the veins, which occupy half of the leading edge of the wing. Its spiracle is white and is facing toward its dorsum. The cilia of the females is whitish yellow and becomes ochreous yellow closer to the tornal area. The cilia of the males on the other hand is light grey, in combination with white. Males also have narrow hindwings while females have a grey base. Its hair-pencil is costal and is grey for males while it is lighter for females.
