= Procometis mistharma =

Scientific classification
- Domain: Eukaryota
- Kingdom: Animalia
- Phylum: Arthropoda
- Class: Insecta
- Order: Lepidoptera
- Family: Autostichidae
- Genus: Procometis
- Species: P. mistharma

Binomial name
- Procometis mistharma (Meyrick, 1908)

Synonyms
- Odites mistharma Meyrick, 1908

Species of moth

Procometis mistharma is a moth in the family Autostichidae. It was described by Edward Meyrick in 1908. It is found in Sri Lanka.

The wingspan is 11–14 mm. The forewings are light brownish ochreous, more or less irrorated (sprinkled) finely with brown or fuscous and with a black dot on the base of the costa. The stigmata are blackish, the discal rather near together, the plical directly beneath the first discal. There is a row of blackish dots along the posterior part of the costa and termen to before the tornus. The hindwings are grey.
