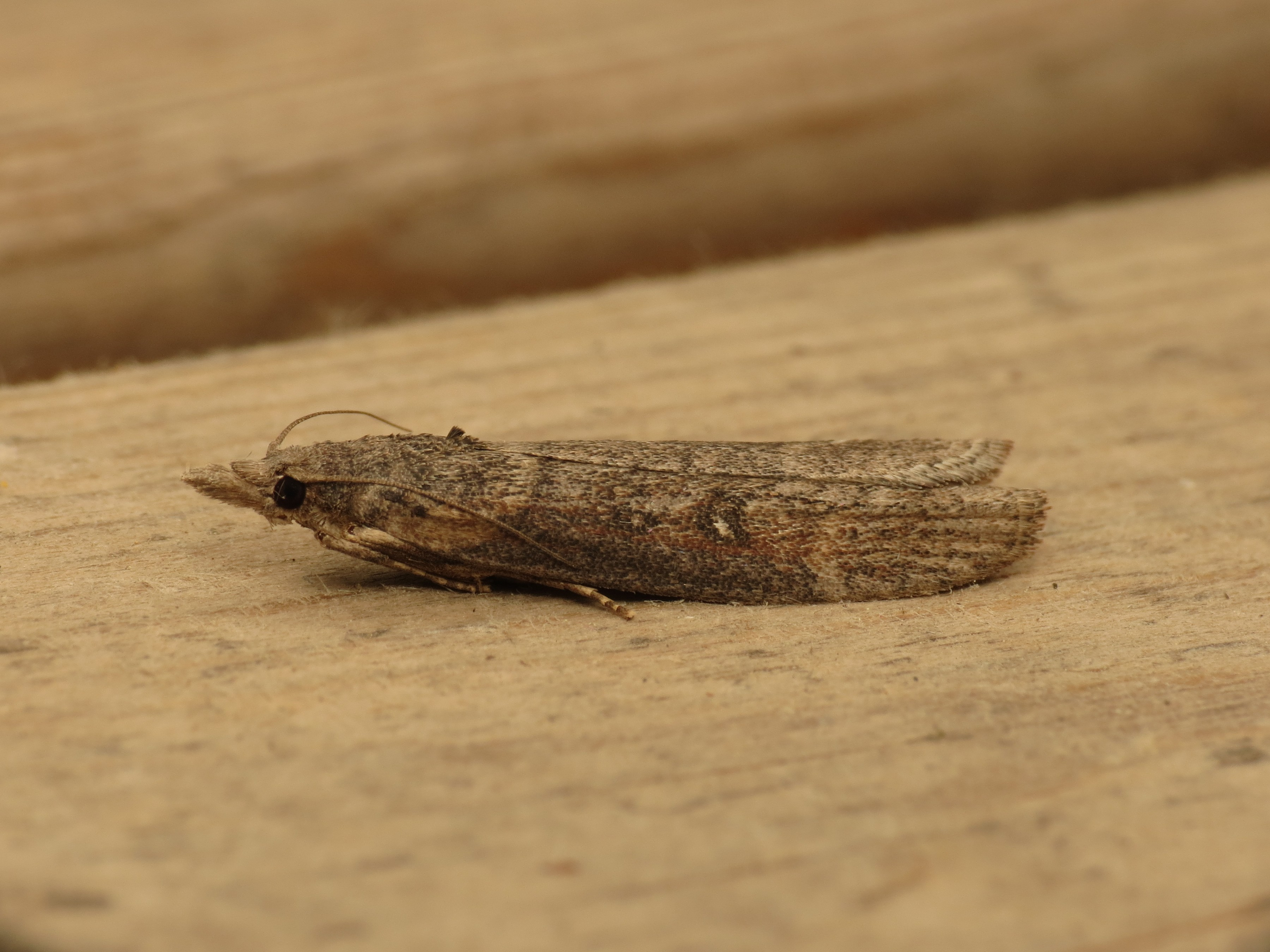

Scientific classification
- Domain: Eukaryota
- Kingdom: Animalia
- Phylum: Arthropoda
- Class: Insecta
- Order: Lepidoptera
- Family: Pyralidae
- Genus: Aphomia
- Species: A. zelleri

Binomial name
- Aphomia zelleri (de Joannis, 1932)

Synonyms
- Melissoblaptes zelleri de Joannis, 1932; Melissoblaptes bipunctanus bipunctanus J. Curtis, 1828; Melissoblaptes bipunctanus Zeller, 1848; Melissoblaptes bipunctanus var. decolor Caradja, 1910; Melissoblaptes bipunctanus var. sapozhnikovi Krulikovsky, 1909

= Aphomia zelleri =

Species of moth

Aphomia zelleri is a species of snout moth in the genus Aphomia. It was described by Joseph de Joannis in 1932, and is known from Central Asia and most of Europe.

The wingspan is 19–27 mm. Adults are on wing from June to August.
