= Aphomia pygmealis =

Scientific classification
- Kingdom: Animalia
- Phylum: Arthropoda
- Class: Insecta
- Order: Lepidoptera
- Family: Pyralidae
- Genus: Aphomia
- Species: A. pygmealis

Binomial name
- Aphomia pygmealis (Caradja & Meyrick, 1935)

Synonyms
- Melissoblaptes pygmealis Caradja & Meyrick, 1935

Species of moth

Aphomia pygmealis is a species of snout moth in the genus Aphomia. It was described by Aristide Caradja and Edward Meyrick in 1935 and is known from China.
