= Procometis trochala =

Scientific classification
- Domain: Eukaryota
- Kingdom: Animalia
- Phylum: Arthropoda
- Class: Insecta
- Order: Lepidoptera
- Family: Autostichidae
- Genus: Procometis
- Species: P. trochala

Binomial name
- Procometis trochala Meyrick, 1908

Species of moth

Procometis trochala is a moth of the family Autostichidae. It is found in Sri Lanka and India (Bengal).

The wingspan is about 21 mm for males and 35 mm for females. The forewings are brown, in males slightly, in females suffusedly sprinkled with dark fuscous, especially in the disc and towards the termen, the costa suffused with dark fuscous, except towards the base, more broadly in females. The discal stigmata are obscurely indicated by dark fuscous suffusion, the second tending to be transversely double. The hindwings are whitish-ochreous slightly tinged with fuscous posteriorly, with ochreous-yellowish costal hairpencil.

The larvae feed on dry leaves of sugarcane.
