= Aphomia pimelodes =

Scientific classification
- Kingdom: Animalia
- Phylum: Arthropoda
- Class: Insecta
- Order: Lepidoptera
- Family: Pyralidae
- Genus: Aphomia
- Species: A. pimelodes

Binomial name
- Aphomia pimelodes Meyrick, 1936

Species of moth

Aphomia pimelodes is a species of snout moth in the genus Aphomia. It was described by Edward Meyrick in 1936. It is found in Zimbabwe.
