= Aphomia fuscolimbellus =

Scientific classification
- Domain: Eukaryota
- Kingdom: Animalia
- Phylum: Arthropoda
- Class: Insecta
- Order: Lepidoptera
- Family: Pyralidae
- Genus: Aphomia
- Species: A. fuscolimbellus

Binomial name
- Aphomia fuscolimbellus (Ragonot, 1887)

Synonyms
- Melissoblaptes fuscolimbellus Ragonot, 1887; Aphomia fuscolimbella

Species of moth

Aphomia fuscolimbellus is a species of snout moth in the genus Aphomia. It was described by Ragonot in 1887. It seems to be described from North America, but the origin of the species is unknown.

== Taxonomy ==
M. Alma Solis and M. A. Metz dispute that A. fuscolimbella, as described by Ragonot, belongs in the Aphomia genus. Their conclusion is based on morphological analysis, as well as the fact that other Aphomia species have not been found in the Western Hemisphere. They have not proposed an alternate placement.
