= Aphomia unicolor =

Scientific classification
- Domain: Eukaryota
- Kingdom: Animalia
- Phylum: Arthropoda
- Class: Insecta
- Order: Lepidoptera
- Family: Pyralidae
- Genus: Aphomia
- Species: A. unicolor

Binomial name
- Aphomia unicolor (Staudinger, 1879)

Synonyms
- Melissoblaptes anellus unicolor Staudinger, 1879

Species of moth

Aphomia unicolor is a species of snout moth in the genus Aphomia. It was described by Otto Staudinger in 1879 and is known from Greece, Spain, Algeria and Asia Minor.
