= Procometis genialis =

Scientific classification
- Domain: Eukaryota
- Kingdom: Animalia
- Phylum: Arthropoda
- Class: Insecta
- Order: Lepidoptera
- Family: Autostichidae
- Genus: Procometis
- Species: P. genialis

Binomial name
- Procometis genialis Meyrick, 1890

Species of moth

Procometis genialis is a moth in the family Autostichidae. It was described by Edward Meyrick in 1890. It is found in Australia, where it has been recorded from Queensland.

The wingspan is 19–20 mm. The forewings are ashy white, densely irrorated (sprinkled) with blackish and with the markings obscure, fuscous, irrorated with black. There is a short longitudinal dash in the disc at about the middle, a longitudinal streak above the inner margin from one-third to the anal angle, interrupted in the middle of the wing, and a less marked streak along the inner margin and hindmargin from the base to the apex. A small cloudy roundish ochreous spot is found in the disc at four-fifths. The hindwings are yellow ochreous, somewhat fuscous tinged, especially posteriorly.
