= Procometis ochricilia =

Scientific classification
- Domain: Eukaryota
- Kingdom: Animalia
- Phylum: Arthropoda
- Class: Insecta
- Order: Lepidoptera
- Family: Autostichidae
- Genus: Procometis
- Species: P. ochricilia

Binomial name
- Procometis ochricilia Meyrick, 1921

Species of moth

Procometis ochricilia is a moth in the family Autostichidae. It was described by Edward Meyrick in 1921. It is found in South Africa.

The wingspan is about 40 mm. The forewings are light yellow ochreous, somewhat paler and slightly whitish tinged towards the costa and dorsum. The hindwings are rather dark grey.
