= Aphomia variegatella =

Scientific classification
- Kingdom: Animalia
- Phylum: Arthropoda
- Class: Insecta
- Order: Lepidoptera
- Family: Pyralidae
- Genus: Aphomia
- Species: A. variegatella

Binomial name
- Aphomia variegatella (Hampson in Ragonot, 1901)

Synonyms
- Melissoblaptes variegatella Hampson in Ragonot, 1901

Species of moth

Aphomia variegatella is a species of snout moth in the genus Aphomia. It was described by entomologist George Hampson in 1901 and is known from Malaysia and Borneo.
