= Aphomia poliocyma =

Scientific classification
- Domain: Eukaryota
- Kingdom: Animalia
- Phylum: Arthropoda
- Class: Insecta
- Order: Lepidoptera
- Family: Pyralidae
- Genus: Aphomia
- Species: A. poliocyma

Binomial name
- Aphomia poliocyma Turner, 1937

Species of moth

Aphomia poliocyma is a species of snout moth in the genus Aphomia. It was described by Turner in 1937, and is known from Australia (it was described from Sydney).
