= Aphomia isodesma =

Scientific classification
- Kingdom: Animalia
- Phylum: Arthropoda
- Class: Insecta
- Order: Lepidoptera
- Family: Pyralidae
- Genus: Aphomia
- Species: A. isodesma

Binomial name
- Aphomia isodesma (Meyrick, 1886)

Synonyms
- Melissoblaptes isodesma Meyrick, 1886

Species of moth

Aphomia isodesma is a species of snout moth in the genus Aphomia. It was described by Edward Meyrick in 1886 and is known from Fiji.
