= Procometis sphendonistis =

Scientific classification
- Domain: Eukaryota
- Kingdom: Animalia
- Phylum: Arthropoda
- Class: Insecta
- Order: Lepidoptera
- Family: Autostichidae
- Genus: Procometis
- Species: P. sphendonistis

Binomial name
- Procometis sphendonistis (Meyrick, 1908)

Synonyms
- Odites sphendonistis Meyrick, 1908

Species of moth

Procometis sphendonistis is a moth in the family Autostichidae. It was described by Edward Meyrick in 1908. It is found in Sri Lanka.

The wingspan is about 14 mm. The forewings are light greyish ochreous suffusedly irrorated (sprinkled) with fuscous and with a blackish basal dot in the middle, and one on the base of the costa. The stigmata are rather large, black, the plical slightly beyond the first discal. There is a row of blackish dots along the posterior part of the costa and termen to before the tornus. The hindwings are grey.
