= Procometis coniochersa =

Scientific classification
- Domain: Eukaryota
- Kingdom: Animalia
- Phylum: Arthropoda
- Class: Insecta
- Order: Lepidoptera
- Family: Autostichidae
- Genus: Procometis
- Species: P. coniochersa

Binomial name
- Procometis coniochersa Meyrick, 1922

Species of moth

Procometis coniochersa is a moth in the family Autostichidae. It was described by Edward Meyrick in 1922. It is found in north-western Australia.

The wingspan is about 40 mm. The forewings are light grey irregularly irrorated (sprinkled) with whitish-grey grey-tipped scales. The costal edge is whitish from near the base to three-fourths. The stigmata are cloudy, dark grey, the plical beneath the first discal, the discal joined by an obscure streak of whitish suffusion. There is a line of whitish suffusion along the fold. The hindwings are light grey.
