= Procometis acutipennis =

Scientific classification
- Domain: Eukaryota
- Kingdom: Animalia
- Phylum: Arthropoda
- Class: Insecta
- Order: Lepidoptera
- Family: Autostichidae
- Genus: Procometis
- Species: P. acutipennis

Binomial name
- Procometis acutipennis (Walsingham, 1891)

Synonyms
- Apiletria acutipennis Walsingham, 1891

Species of moth

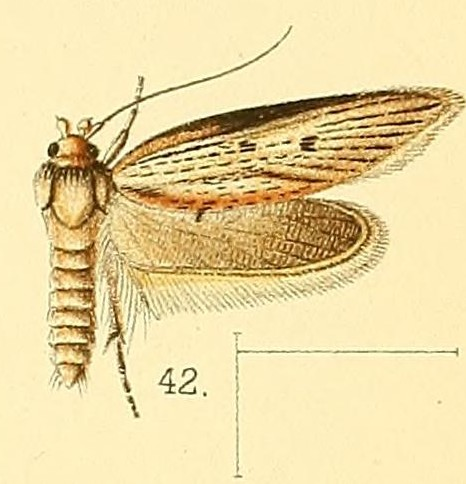
Procometis acutipennis

Procometis acutipennis is a moth of the family Autostichidae. It is known from the Gambia and Congo.

The wingspan of this species is about 26 mm. The forewings are pale cinereous, sparsely sprinkled with elongate fuscous scales, much shaded along the costal margin and on the dorsal margin about the obsolete anal angle with brown and greyish fuscous. There are two small fuscous spots, the first at about half the wing-length, slightly above the middle, the second on the same level beyond it, less than half-way to the apex. The hindwings are greyish cinereous.
