= Procometis milvina =

Scientific classification
- Domain: Eukaryota
- Kingdom: Animalia
- Phylum: Arthropoda
- Class: Insecta
- Order: Lepidoptera
- Family: Autostichidae
- Genus: Procometis
- Species: P. milvina

Binomial name
- Procometis milvina Meyrick, 1914

Species of moth

Procometis milvina is a moth in the family Autostichidae. It was described by Edward Meyrick in 1914. It is found in South Africa.

The wingspan is 38–44 mm. The forewings are light greyish ochreous, with a faint pinkish tinge, the costal area slightly darker and the costal edge white except towards the extremities. The discal stigmata are minute, fuscous, placed on a very undefined median-longitudinal streak of whitish suffusion. The hindwings are pale greyish, suffused with whitish towards the base.
