= Aphomia burellus =

Scientific classification
- Domain: Eukaryota
- Kingdom: Animalia
- Phylum: Arthropoda
- Class: Insecta
- Order: Lepidoptera
- Family: Pyralidae
- Genus: Aphomia
- Species: A. burellus

Binomial name
- Aphomia burellus (Holland, 1900)

Synonyms
- Melissoblaptes burellus Holland, 1900

Species of moth

Aphomia burellus is a species of snout moth in the genus Aphomia. It was described by William Jacob Holland in 1900 and is known from Buru in Indonesia.
