= Aphomia spoliatrix =

Scientific classification
- Domain: Eukaryota
- Kingdom: Animalia
- Phylum: Arthropoda
- Class: Insecta
- Order: Lepidoptera
- Family: Pyralidae
- Genus: Aphomia
- Species: A. spoliatrix

Binomial name
- Aphomia spoliatrix Christoph, 1881

Species of moth

Aphomia spoliatrix is a species of snout moth in the genus Aphomia. It was described by Hugo Theodor Christoph in 1881 and is known from south-eastern Siberia.
