= Procometis stenarga =

Scientific classification
- Domain: Eukaryota
- Kingdom: Animalia
- Phylum: Arthropoda
- Class: Insecta
- Order: Lepidoptera
- Family: Autostichidae
- Genus: Procometis
- Species: P. stenarga

Binomial name
- Procometis stenarga Turner, 1902

Species of moth

Procometis stenarga is a moth of the family Oecophoridae. It is found in Australia, where it has been recorded from Queensland.

The wingspan is 22–25 millimetres (0.87–0.98 in) and adults are black coloured. Males have ochreous coloured segments of the apices and abdomen. The abdomen of the females, as well as the cilia, and hindwings are grey coloured. Both sexes have rounded hindmargins, as well as a rounded apex. The forewings are elongated and the legs are both dark and white. The middle of the rib is almost white coloured.
