= Aphomia erumpens =

Scientific classification
- Domain: Eukaryota
- Kingdom: Animalia
- Phylum: Arthropoda
- Class: Insecta
- Order: Lepidoptera
- Family: Pyralidae
- Genus: Aphomia
- Species: A. erumpens

Binomial name
- Aphomia erumpens (T.P. Lucas, 1898)

Synonyms
- Aphonia erumpens Lucas, 1898

Species of moth

Aphomia erumpens is a species of snout moth in the genus Aphomia. It was described by Thomas Pennington Lucas in 1898 and is known from Queensland, Australia.
