= Aphomia argentia =

Scientific classification
- Kingdom: Animalia
- Phylum: Arthropoda
- Class: Insecta
- Order: Lepidoptera
- Family: Pyralidae
- Genus: Aphomia
- Species: A. argentia

Binomial name
- Aphomia argentia Whalley, 1964

Species of moth

Aphomia argentia is a species of snout moth in the genus Aphomia. It was described by Paul Whalley in 1964, and is known from Zambia.
