= Aphomia sopozhnikovi =

Scientific classification
- Domain: Eukaryota
- Kingdom: Animalia
- Phylum: Arthropoda
- Class: Insecta
- Order: Lepidoptera
- Family: Pyralidae
- Genus: Aphomia
- Species: A. sopozhnikovi

Binomial name
- Aphomia sopozhnikovi (Krulikovsky, 1909)

Species of moth

Aphomia sopozhnikovi is a moth of the family Pyralidae first described by Leonid Konstantinovich Krulikovsky in 1909. It is found in Sri Lanka.
