= Procometis terrena =

Scientific classification
- Domain: Eukaryota
- Kingdom: Animalia
- Phylum: Arthropoda
- Class: Insecta
- Order: Lepidoptera
- Family: Autostichidae
- Genus: Procometis
- Species: P. terrena

Binomial name
- Procometis terrena Meyrick, 1908

Synonyms
- Procometis (Hyostola) terrena

Species of moth

Procometis terrena is a moth of the family Autostichidae. It is endemic to Malawi and Zambia.

The wingspan is about 37 mm. The forewings are rather dark ashy-fuscous, lighter posteriorly. There is a broad ochreous-brown median stripe from the base, becoming suffused and obsolete beyond the middle, edged above by groups of scattered black scales beyond one-fourth and about the middle, and followed by two minute black dots transversely placed at two-thirds. The hindwings are light fuscous.
