= Aphomia taiwanalis =

Scientific classification
- Domain: Eukaryota
- Kingdom: Animalia
- Phylum: Arthropoda
- Class: Insecta
- Order: Lepidoptera
- Family: Pyralidae
- Genus: Aphomia
- Species: A. taiwanalis

Binomial name
- Aphomia taiwanalis (Shibuya, 1928)

Synonyms
- Ilithyia taiwanalis Shibuya, 1928; Canthelea taiwanalis

Species of moth

Aphomia taiwanalis is a species of moth of the family Pyralidae described by Jinshichi Shibuya in 1928. It is found in Taiwan.
