= Siege of Corfu =

Siege of Corfu may refer to:

- Siege of Corfu (1149), Byzantine capture of the city from the Normans
- Siege of Corfu (1122–1123), by the Republic of Venice
- Siege of Corfu (1431), unsuccessful Ottoman military incursion led by Ali Bey
- Siege of Corfu (1537) by the Ottoman Turks led by Hayreddin Barbarossa
- Siege of Corfu (1571), during the Ottoman–Venetian War (1570–1573)
- Siege of Corfu (1573), during the Ottoman–Venetian War (1570–1573)
- Siege of Corfu (1716) by the Ottoman Turks
- Siege of Corfu (1798–1799) by a Russian-Turkish fleet led by admiral Fyodor Ushakov

== See also ==
- Corfu (disambiguation)
