= Aphomia homochroa =

Scientific classification
- Domain: Eukaryota
- Kingdom: Animalia
- Phylum: Arthropoda
- Class: Insecta
- Order: Lepidoptera
- Family: Pyralidae
- Genus: Aphomia
- Species: A. homochroa

Binomial name
- Aphomia homochroa (Turner, 1905)

Synonyms
- Melissoblaptes homochroa Turner, 1905

Species of moth

Aphomia homochroa is a species of snout moth in the genus Aphomia. It was described by Alfred Jefferis Turner in 1905 and is known from Australia (it was described from Queensland).
