= Procometis melanthes =

Scientific classification
- Kingdom: Animalia
- Phylum: Arthropoda
- Class: Insecta
- Order: Lepidoptera
- Family: Autostichidae
- Genus: Procometis
- Species: P. melanthes

Binomial name
- Procometis melanthes Turner, 1898

Species of moth

Procometis melanthes is a moth in the family Autostichidae. It was described by Turner in 1898. It is found in Australia, where it has been recorded from Queensland.

The wingspan is about 30 mm. The forewings are blackish-fuscous irrorated with whitish scales. The absence of these leaves the following markings: a short longitudinal line from the base, an indistinctly double spot in the disc before the middle, placed obliquely, a closely similar spot in the disc beyond the middle, a blackish area at the apex sharply bounded internally, sharply bent inwards in the disc to form a sharp process, then outwardly curved to the anal angle. The hindwings are fuscous, paler towards the base.
