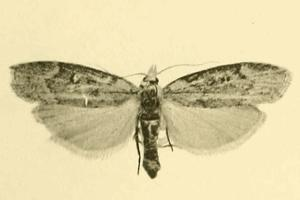

Scientific classification
- Domain: Eukaryota
- Kingdom: Animalia
- Phylum: Arthropoda
- Class: Insecta
- Order: Lepidoptera
- Family: Pyralidae
- Genus: Aphomia
- Species: A. curvicostella

Binomial name
- Aphomia curvicostella (Zerny, 1914)

Synonyms
- Melissoblaptes curvicostella Zerny, 1914

= Aphomia curvicostella =

Species of moth

Aphomia curvicostella is a species of snout moth in the genus Aphomia. It was described by Hans Zerny in 1914. It is found in Russia.

The length of the forewings is 12–15 mm.
