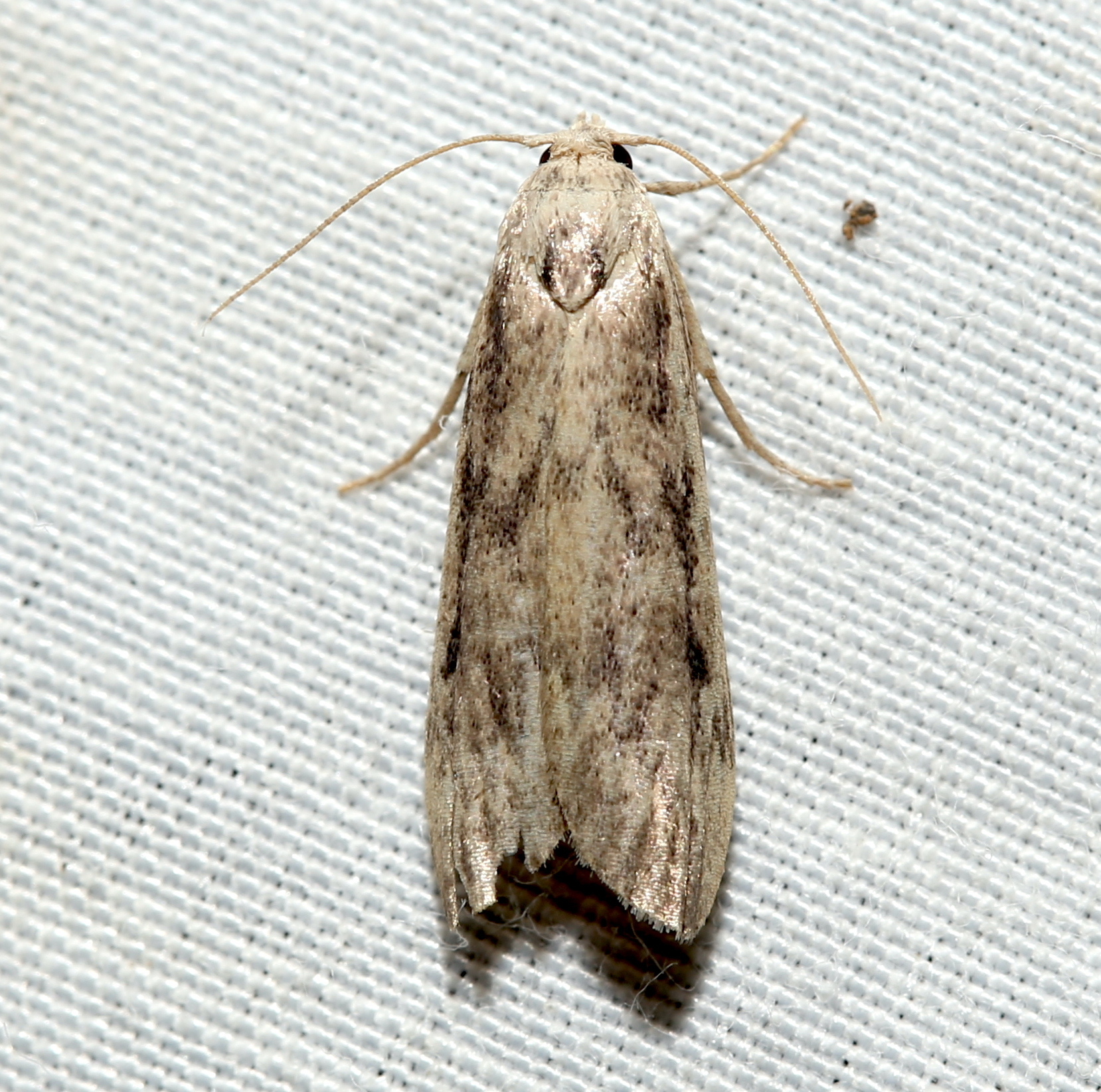

Scientific classification
- Kingdom: Animalia
- Phylum: Arthropoda
- Clade: Pancrustacea
- Class: Insecta
- Order: Lepidoptera
- Family: Pyralidae
- Genus: Aphomia
- Species: A. fulminalis

Binomial name
- Aphomia fulminalis (Zeller, 1872)

Synonyms
- Melissoblaptes fulminalis Zeller, 1872

= Aphomia fulminalis =

Species of moth

Aphomia fulminalis is a species of snout moth in the genus Aphomia. It was described by Zeller in 1872, and is known from the United States, where it has been recorded from Arizona, Connecticut, Illinois, Massachusetts, Maryland, Maine, Mississippi, New York, Pennsylvania, Texas and Nova Scotia.
