= Procometis monocalama =

Scientific classification
- Domain: Eukaryota
- Kingdom: Animalia
- Phylum: Arthropoda
- Class: Insecta
- Order: Lepidoptera
- Family: Autostichidae
- Genus: Procometis
- Species: P. monocalama

Binomial name
- Procometis monocalama Meyrick, 1890

Species of moth

Procometis monocalama is a moth in the family Autostichidae. It was described by Edward Meyrick in 1890. It is found in Australia, where it has been recorded from New South Wales.

The wingspan is about 18 mm. The forewings are ochreous fuscous, irrorated (sprinkled) with whitish and with a snow-white streak along the costa from the base to near the apex, bordered beneath by a broader rather dark ochreous-fuscous streak without white irroration, extending from the base to the apex. There is a short white longitudinal dash on the lower margin of the dark streak about the middle or obscurely continued to the base. The hindwings are rather light fuscous.
