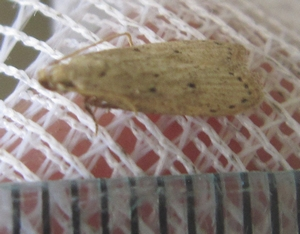
- Corcyra cephalonica

Scientific classification
- Kingdom: Animalia
- Phylum: Arthropoda
- Class: Insecta
- Order: Lepidoptera
- Family: Pyralidae
- Tribe: Megarthridiini
- Genus: Corcyra; Ragonot, 1885

Synonyms
- Tineopsis Dyar, 1913

= Corcyra (moth) =

Genus of moths

Corcyra is a genus of snout moths. It was described by Ragonot in 1885, and is known from China, Great Britain, Australia, and Egypt.

== Species ==
These four species belong to the genus Corcyra, after the species Corcyra brunnea was moved to the genus Procometis.

- Corcyra asthenitis Turner, 1904
- Corcyra cephalonica Stainton, 1866
- Corcyra lineata Legrand, 1965
- Corcyra nidicolella Rebel, 1914

Some researchers have recently determined Corcyra to be a synonym of the genus Aphomia, and treat the above species as members of Aphomia.

== See also ==
- Rice moth
- Aphomia
