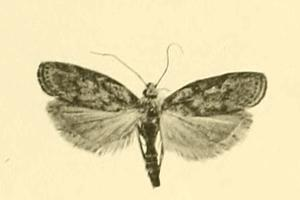

Scientific classification
- Domain: Eukaryota
- Kingdom: Animalia
- Phylum: Arthropoda
- Class: Insecta
- Order: Lepidoptera
- Family: Pyralidae
- Genus: Aphomia
- Species: A. murciella

Binomial name
- Aphomia murciella (Zerny, 1914)

Synonyms
- Melissoblaptes murciella Zerny, 1914; Melissoblaptes murciellus

= Aphomia murciella =

Species of moth

Aphomia murciella is a species of snout moth in the genus Aphomia. It was described by Zerny in 1914, and is known from Spain.

The length of the forewings is 9–10 mm.
