= Aphomia euchelliellus =

Scientific classification
- Kingdom: Animalia
- Phylum: Arthropoda
- Class: Insecta
- Order: Lepidoptera
- Family: Pyralidae
- Genus: Aphomia
- Species: A. euchelliellus

Binomial name
- Aphomia euchelliellus (Snellen, 1900)

Synonyms
- Melissoblaptes euchelliellus Snellen, 1900

Species of moth

Aphomia euchelliellus is a species of snout moth in the genus Aphomia. It was described by Snellen, in 1900, and is known from Java in Indonesia.
