= Procometis bisulcata =

Scientific classification
- Domain: Eukaryota
- Kingdom: Animalia
- Phylum: Arthropoda
- Class: Insecta
- Order: Lepidoptera
- Family: Autostichidae
- Genus: Procometis
- Species: P. bisulcata

Binomial name
- Procometis bisulcata Meyrick, 1890

Species of moth

Procometis bisulcata is a moth in the family Autostichidae. It was described by Edward Meyrick in 1890. It is found in Australia, where it has been recorded from New South Wales.

The wingspan is 17–20 mm. The forewings are ochreous fuscous or brownish ochreous with a silvery-white streak along the costa from the base almost to the apex. There is a straight central longitudinal silvery-white streak from the base to the hindmargin beneath the apex, more or less suffused on the lower edge, sometimes tending to become obsolete posteriorly. The hindwings in males are whitish ochreous, posteriorly fuscous tinged, while they are fuscous, paler towards the base in females.
