= Aphomia foedella =

Scientific classification
- Kingdom: Animalia
- Phylum: Arthropoda
- Class: Insecta
- Order: Lepidoptera
- Family: Pyralidae
- Genus: Aphomia
- Species: A. foedella

Binomial name
- Aphomia foedella (Zeller, 1839)

Synonyms
- Galleria foedella Zeller, 1839; Melissoblaptes foedella Zeller, 1839

Species of moth

Aphomia foedella is a species of snout moth (family Pyralidae). It was described by Philipp Christoph Zeller in 1839. It is found in the Czech Republic, Slovakia, Hungary, Romania, Ukraine, Serbia, and Italy.
