= Procometis periscia =

Scientific classification
- Domain: Eukaryota
- Kingdom: Animalia
- Phylum: Arthropoda
- Class: Insecta
- Order: Lepidoptera
- Family: Autostichidae
- Genus: Procometis
- Species: P. periscia

Binomial name
- Procometis periscia Lower, 1903

Species of moth

Procometis periscia is a moth in the family Autostichidae. It was described by Oswald Bertram Lower in 1903. It is found in Australia, where it has been recorded from Victoria.

The wingspan is about 16 mm. The forewings are dark fuscous, more or less minutely irrorated (sprinkled) with fine whitish scales and with a fine white line along the fold, from the base to the anal angle. There is a fine white line in the middle of the wing, from near the base to near three-fourths, attenuated anteriorly and edged above with a fine black line. The veins towards the termen are more or less outlined with blackish. The hindwings are rather dark fuscous.
