= Procometis hylonoma =

Scientific classification
- Domain: Eukaryota
- Kingdom: Animalia
- Phylum: Arthropoda
- Class: Insecta
- Order: Lepidoptera
- Family: Autostichidae
- Genus: Procometis
- Species: P. hylonoma

Binomial name
- Procometis hylonoma Meyrick, 1890

Synonyms
- Procometis acompsa Turner, 1898; Procometis heterogama Lower, 1899; Macrozygona microtoma Lower, 1903

Species of moth

Procometis hylonoma is a moth in the family Autostichidae. It was described by Edward Meyrick in 1890. It is found in Australia, where it has been recorded from New South Wales, Victoria, and South Australia.

The wingspan is 18–25 mm. The forewings are white, more or less irrorated (sprinkled) irregularly with ochreous fuscous, sometimes suffused with whitish ochreous on the dorsal half. There is a fuscous dot on the fold beneath the middle, and another in the disc at two-thirds, sometimes very indistinct. The hindwings are light fuscous, darker towards the hindmargin, paler and more whitish ochreous towards the base.
