= Aphomia melli =

Scientific classification
- Kingdom: Animalia
- Phylum: Arthropoda
- Class: Insecta
- Order: Lepidoptera
- Family: Pyralidae
- Genus: Aphomia
- Species: A. melli

Binomial name
- Aphomia melli (Caradja & Meyrick, 1933)

Synonyms
- Melissoblaptes melli Caradja & Meyrick, 1933

Species of moth

Aphomia melli is a species of snout moth in the genus Aphomia. It was described by Aristide Caradja and Edward Meyrick in 1933 and is known from China.
