= Aphomia caffralis =

Scientific classification
- Kingdom: Animalia
- Phylum: Arthropoda
- Class: Insecta
- Order: Lepidoptera
- Family: Pyralidae
- Genus: Aphomia
- Species: A. caffralis

Binomial name
- Aphomia caffralis Hampson, 1917

Species of moth

Aphomia caffralis is a species of snout moth in the genus Aphomia. It was described by George Hampson in 1917 and is known from South Africa.
