= Procometis spoliatrix =

Scientific classification
- Domain: Eukaryota
- Kingdom: Animalia
- Phylum: Arthropoda
- Class: Insecta
- Order: Lepidoptera
- Family: Autostichidae
- Genus: Procometis
- Species: P. spoliatrix

Binomial name
- Procometis spoliatrix (Meyrick, 1916)

Synonyms
- Odites spoliatrix Meyrick, 1916

Species of moth

Procometis spoliatrix is a moth in the family Autostichidae. It was described by Edward Meyrick in 1916. It is found in southern India.

The wingspan is about 16 mm for males and 18 mm for females. The forewings are yellow ochreous with a small black dot on the base of the costa. The stigmata are black, the discal moderate, the plical minute, beneath the first discal. There is a curved pre-marginal series of minute indistinct fuscous dots. The hindwings in males are whitish ochreous tinged with grey, while they are light grey in females.

The larvae were observed forming a gallery in the nest of a social spider, presumably feeding on insect refuse in the web.
