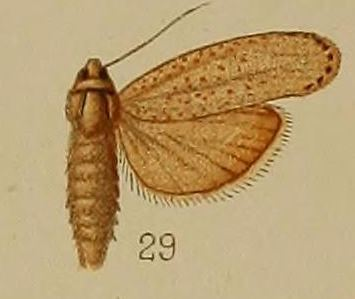

Scientific classification
- Kingdom: Animalia
- Phylum: Arthropoda
- Class: Insecta
- Order: Lepidoptera
- Family: Pyralidae
- Genus: Aphomia
- Species: A. monochroa

Binomial name
- Aphomia monochroa (Hampson, 1912)

Synonyms
- Melissoblaptes monochroa Hampson, 1912

= Aphomia monochroa =

Species of moth

Aphomia monochroa is a species of snout moth in the genus Aphomia. It was described by George Hampson in 1912 and is known from Sri Lanka and India.
