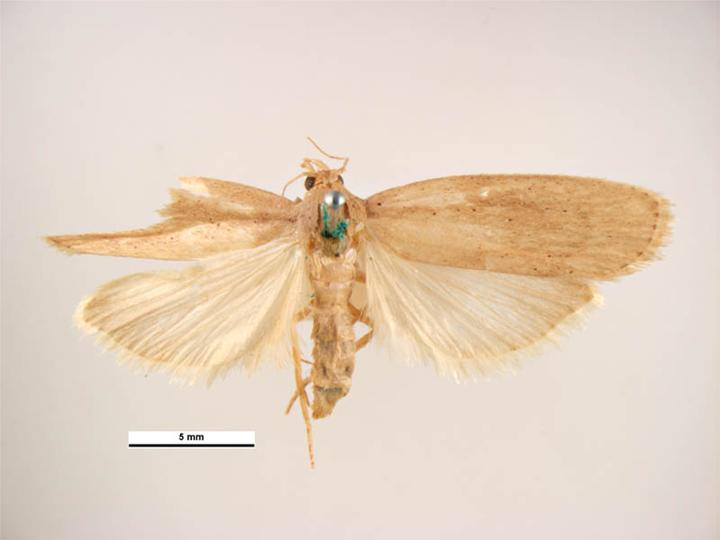

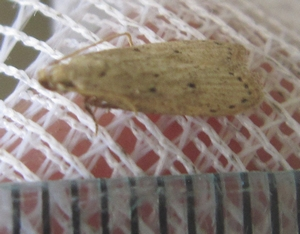

Scientific classification
- Kingdom: Animalia
- Phylum: Arthropoda
- Clade: Pancrustacea
- Class: Insecta
- Order: Lepidoptera
- Family: Pyralidae
- Genus: Corcyra
- Species: C. cephalonica

Binomial name
- Corcyra cephalonica (Stainton, 1866)

Synonyms
- See text

= Rice moth =

Species of moth

The rice moth (Corcyra cephalonica) is a moth of the family Pyralidae. This small moth can become a significant pest. Its caterpillars feed on dry plantstuffs such as seeds, including cereals (e.g. rice). Other recorded foods are flour and dried fruits.

== Synonyms ==
Other scientific names, now invalid, for the rice moth are:

- Anerastia lineata Legrand, 1965
- Corcyra translineella Hampson, 1901
- Melissoblaptes cephalonica Stainton, 1866
- Melissoblaptes oeconomellus Mann, 1872
- Tineopsis theobromae Dyar, 1913

When describing his T. theobromae in 1913, Dyar established the genus Tineopsis. He overlooked, however, that this had already been proposed by Cajetan Freiherr von Felder for a (presumed) arctiid moth in 1861. Nonwithstanding that Felder's species is somewhat dubious and has not been identified in recent lists, Dyar's Tineopsis is a junior homonym and thus invalid in any case.

The species of the genus Corcyra have recently been considered members of the genus Aphomia by some researchers.

== See also ==
- Corcyra
- Aphomia
