= Aphomia distictella =

Scientific classification
- Kingdom: Animalia
- Phylum: Arthropoda
- Class: Insecta
- Order: Lepidoptera
- Family: Pyralidae
- Genus: Aphomia
- Species: A. distictella

Binomial name
- Aphomia distictella Hampson, 1917

Species of moth

Aphomia distictella is a species of snout moth in the genus Aphomia. It was described by George Hampson in 1917 and is known from South Africa.
