= Aphomia ochracea =

Scientific classification
- Kingdom: Animalia
- Phylum: Arthropoda
- Class: Insecta
- Order: Lepidoptera
- Family: Pyralidae
- Genus: Aphomia
- Species: A. ochracea

Binomial name
- Aphomia ochracea Hampson, 1917

Species of moth

Aphomia ochracea is a species of snout moth in the genus Aphomia. It was described by George Hampson in 1917 and is known from Papua New Guinea.
