= Procometis limitata =

Scientific classification
- Domain: Eukaryota
- Kingdom: Animalia
- Phylum: Arthropoda
- Class: Insecta
- Order: Lepidoptera
- Family: Autostichidae
- Genus: Procometis
- Species: P. limitata

Binomial name
- Procometis limitata Meyrick, 1911

Species of moth

Procometis limitata is a moth in the family Autostichidae. It was described by Edward Meyrick in 1911. It is found in South Africa.

The wingspan is about 32 mm. The forewings are pale fuscous irrorated (sprinkled) with whitish, with scattered dark fuscous scales. The costal edge is white from near the base to beyond the middle. There is a fine median streak of white suffusion from the base to two-thirds. The hindwings are grey whitish.
