= Aphomia odontella =

Scientific classification
- Kingdom: Animalia
- Phylum: Arthropoda
- Class: Insecta
- Order: Lepidoptera
- Family: Pyralidae
- Genus: Aphomia
- Species: A. odontella

Binomial name
- Aphomia odontella (Hampson, 1898)

Synonyms
- Melissoblaptes odontella Hampson, 1898

Species of moth

Aphomia odontella is a species of snout moth in the genus Aphomia. It was described by George Hampson in 1898 and is known from Sri Lanka.
