= Procometis diplocentra =

Scientific classification
- Domain: Eukaryota
- Kingdom: Animalia
- Phylum: Arthropoda
- Class: Insecta
- Order: Lepidoptera
- Family: Autostichidae
- Genus: Procometis
- Species: P. diplocentra

Binomial name
- Procometis diplocentra Meyrick, 1890

Synonyms
- Procometis tetraspora Lower, 1903

Species of moth

Procometis diplocentra is a moth of the family Autostichidae that is found in Queensland, the Australian Capital Territory, New South Wales and Victoria.

The wingspan is 19–20 mm. The forewings are ashy-whitish, densely irrorated with dark fuscous, and with scattered black scales. There are two cruciform small dark fuscous spots, transversely placed and confluent, in the disc before the middle, and a third, somewhat larger, in the disc at two-thirds. There is a series of short obscure darker marks before the hindmargin. The hindwings are fuscous-grey.
