= Procometis aplegiopa =

Scientific classification
- Kingdom: Animalia
- Phylum: Arthropoda
- Clade: Pancrustacea
- Class: Insecta
- Order: Lepidoptera
- Family: Autostichidae
- Genus: Procometis
- Species: P. aplegiopa

Binomial name
- Procometis aplegiopa Turner, 1904

Species of moth

Procometis aplegiopa is a moth in the family Autostichidae. It was described by Turner in 1904. It is found in Australia, where it has been recorded from Queensland.

The wingspan is 15–19 mm. The forewings are pale ochreous, sometimes suffused with fuscous, especially towards the dorsum. The hindwings are grey.
