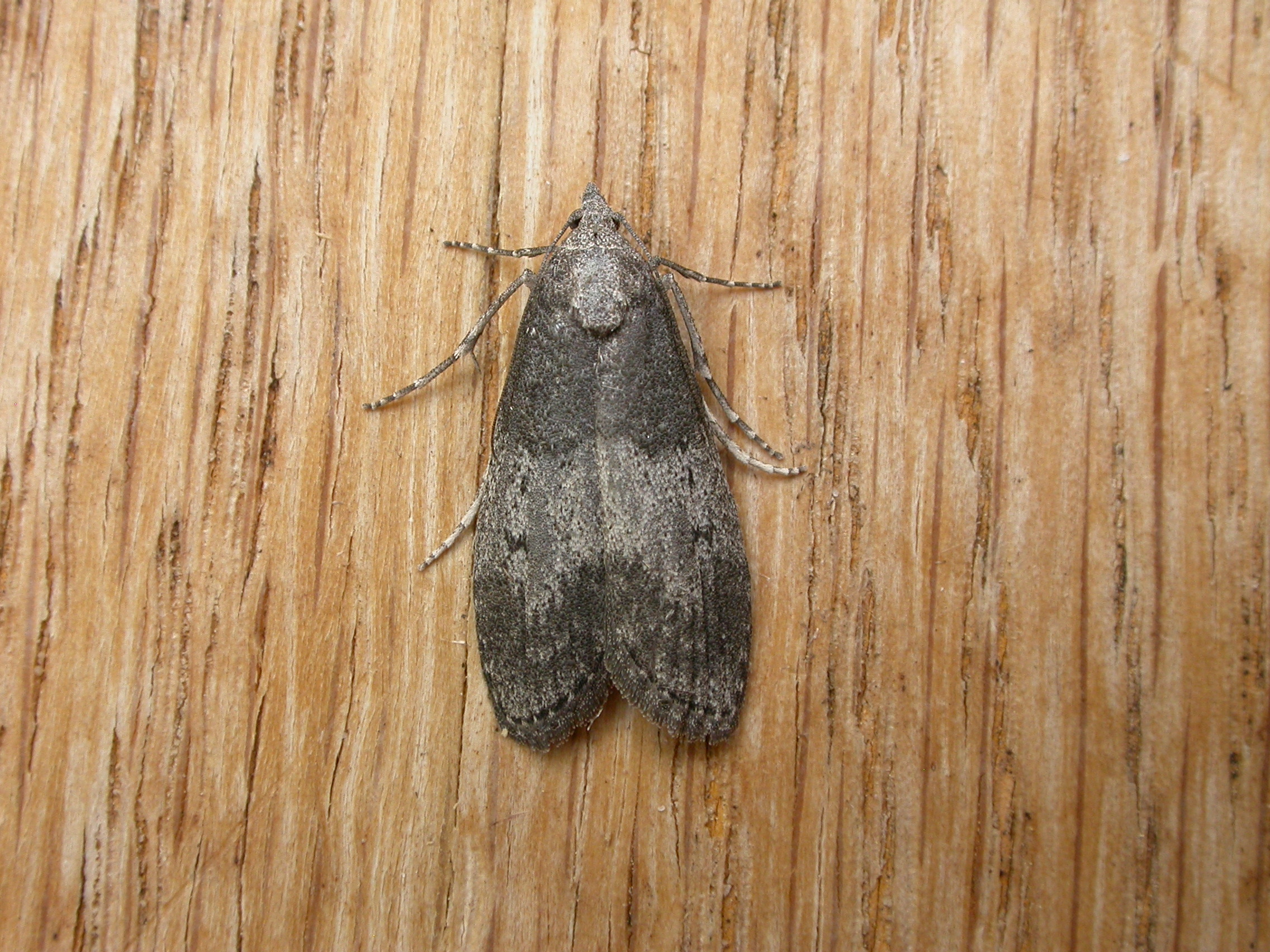

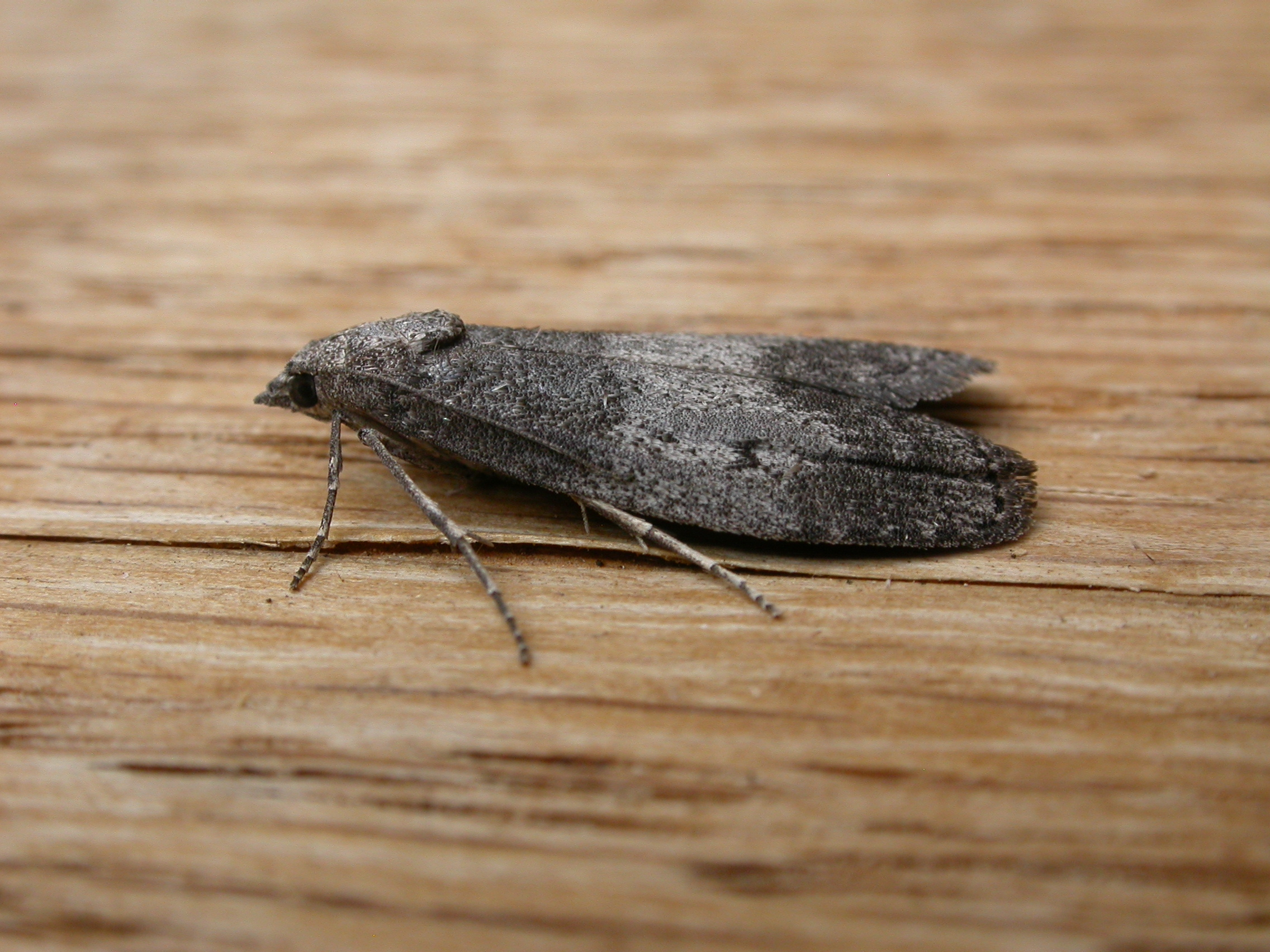

Scientific classification
- Domain: Eukaryota
- Kingdom: Animalia
- Phylum: Arthropoda
- Class: Insecta
- Order: Lepidoptera
- Family: Pyralidae
- Genus: Aphomia
- Species: A. baryptera

Binomial name
- Aphomia baryptera (Lower, 1901)

Synonyms
- Melissoblaptes baryptera Lower, 1901

= Aphomia baryptera =

Species of moth

Aphomia baryptera is a moth of the family Pyralidae. It is known from Australia.
