= Aphomia curvicostellus =

Scientific classification
- Domain: Eukaryota
- Kingdom: Animalia
- Phylum: Arthropoda
- Class: Insecta
- Order: Lepidoptera
- Family: Pyralidae
- Genus: Aphomia
- Species: A. curvicostellus

Binomial name
- Aphomia curvicostellus (Zerny, 1914)

Synonyms
- Melissoblaptes curvicostellus Zerny, 1914

Species of moth

Aphomia curvicostellus is a species of snout moth in the genus Aphomia. It was described by Zerny, in 1914, and is known from Kazakhstan.

The length of the forewings is 12–15 mm.
