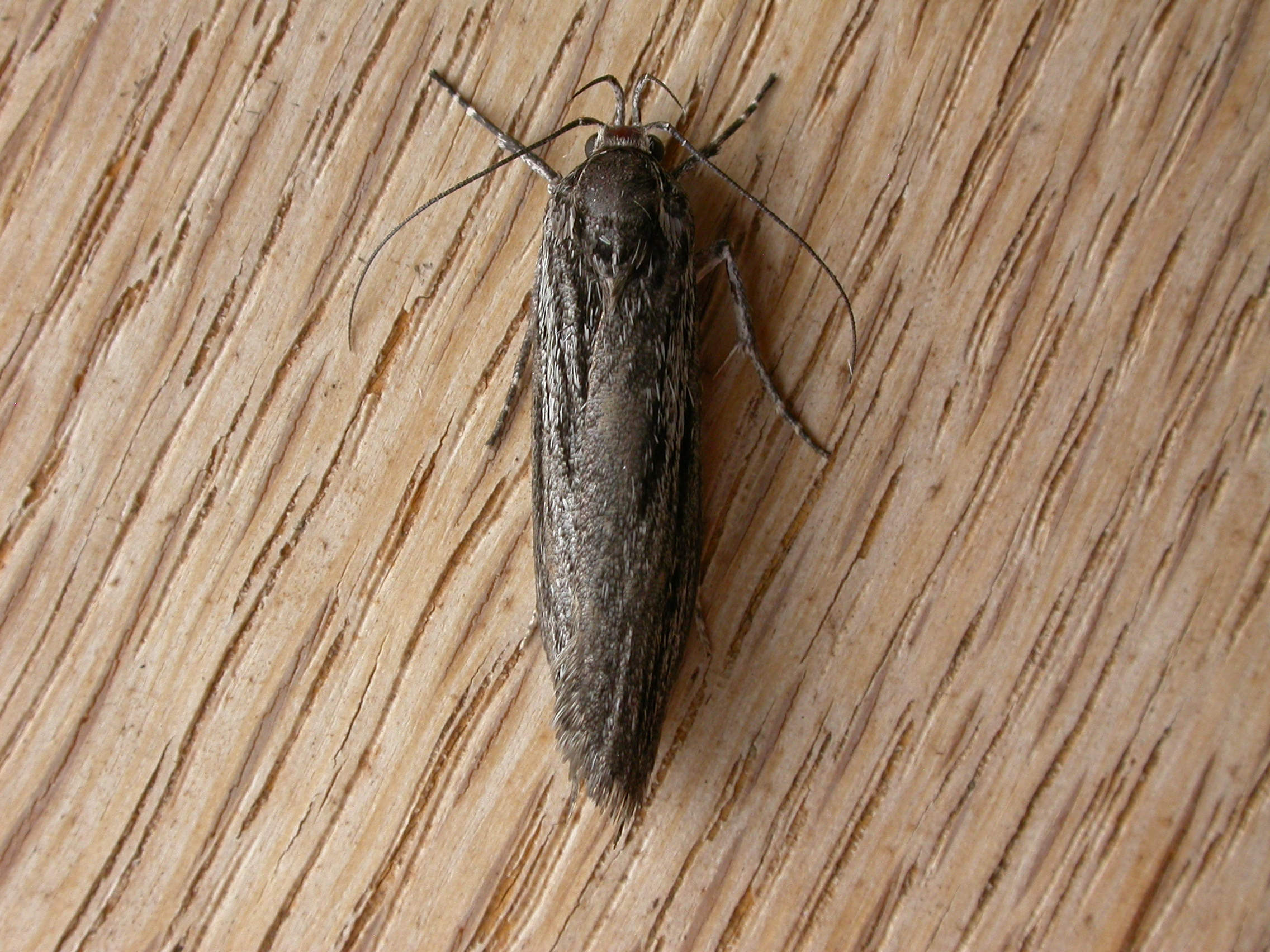

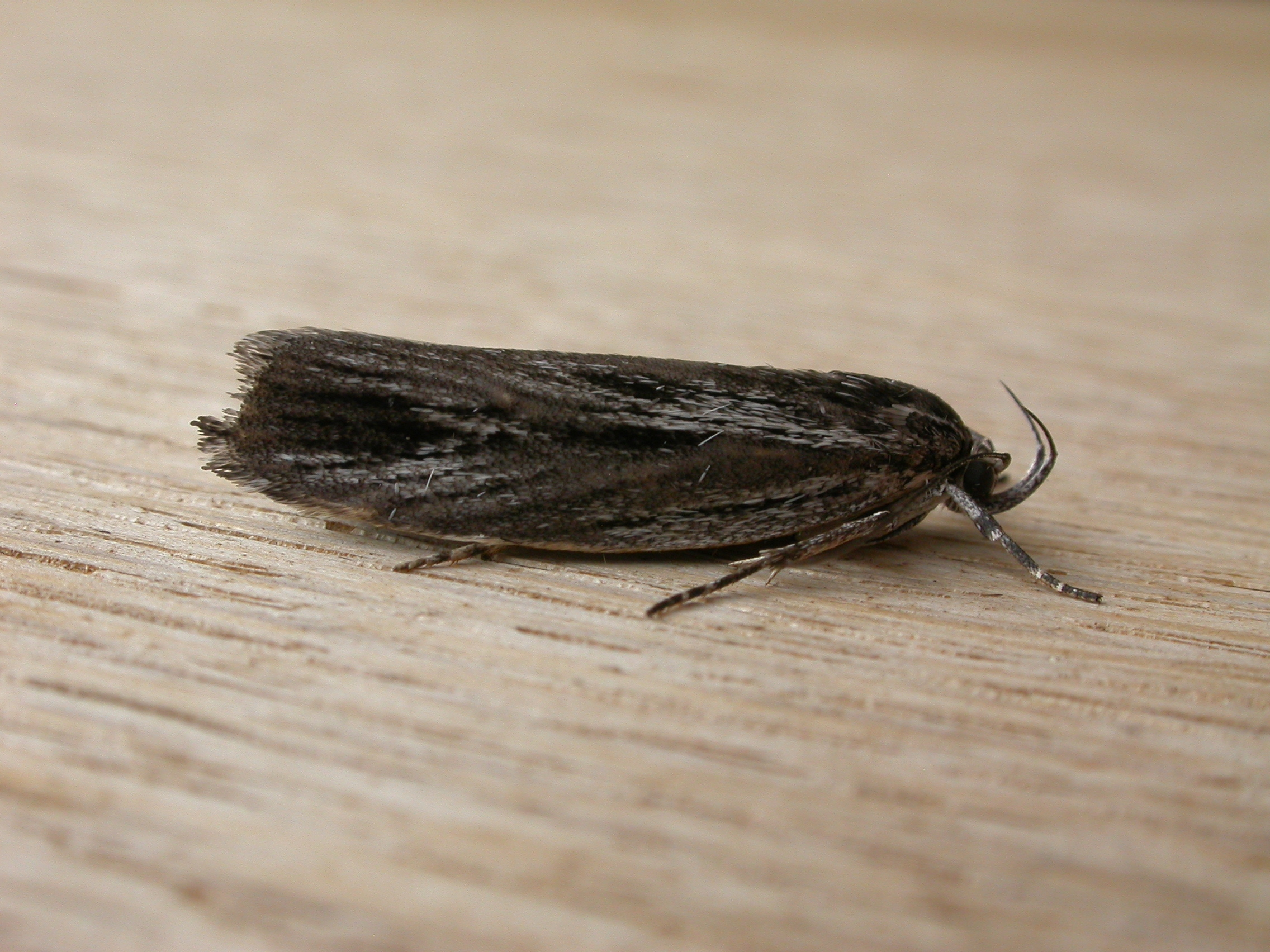

Scientific classification
- Domain: Eukaryota
- Kingdom: Animalia
- Phylum: Arthropoda
- Class: Insecta
- Order: Lepidoptera
- Family: Autostichidae
- Genus: Procometis
- Species: P. phloeodes

Binomial name
- Procometis phloeodes Turner, 1898

= Procometis phloeodes =

Species of moth

Procometis phloeodes is a moth of the family Autostichidae. It is known from New South Wales and Queensland.

The wingspan is about 20 mm. The forewings are streaked dark brown.
