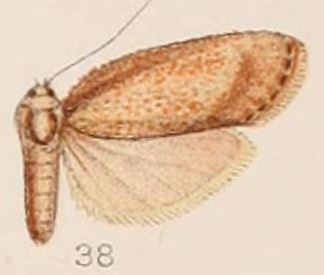

Scientific classification
- Kingdom: Animalia
- Phylum: Arthropoda
- Class: Insecta
- Order: Lepidoptera
- Family: Pyralidae
- Genus: Aphomia
- Species: A. vinotincta

Binomial name
- Aphomia vinotincta (Hampson, 1908)

Synonyms
- Melissoblaptes vinotincta Hampson, 1908

= Aphomia vinotincta =

Species of moth

Aphomia vinotincta is a species of snout moth in the genus Aphomia. It was described by George Hampson in 1908 and is known from Sri Lanka and India.
