= Corcyra nidicolella =

Scientific classification
- Kingdom: Animalia
- Phylum: Arthropoda
- Class: Insecta
- Order: Lepidoptera
- Family: Pyralidae
- Genus: Corcyra
- Species: C. nidicolella

Binomial name
- Corcyra nidicolella Rebel, 1914

Species of moth

Corcyra nidicolella is a species of snout moth in the genus Corcyra. It was described by Hans Rebel in 1914, and is known from Egypt.
