= Procometis brunnea =

Scientific classification
- Domain: Eukaryota
- Kingdom: Animalia
- Phylum: Arthropoda
- Class: Insecta
- Order: Lepidoptera
- Family: Autostichidae
- Genus: Procometis
- Species: P. brunnea

Binomial name
- Procometis brunnea (West, 1931)

Synonyms
- Corcyra brunnea West, 1931

Species of moth

Procometis brunnea is a moth in the family Autostichidae. It was described by West in 1931. It is found in Taiwan.
