= Corfu, Washington =

- Ghost town
- Location within Washington (state)
- Coordinates: 46°48′54″N 119°27′19″W
- Country: United States
- State: Washington
- County: Grant
- Established: 1910
- Elevation: 630 ft (190 m)

Population (1920s)
  - Total: 131
- Time zone: UTC-8 (Pacific (PST))
  - Summer (DST): UTC-7 (PDT)
- ZIP code: 99357
- Area code: 509
- GNIS feature ID: 1510890

Corfu is a ghost town in Grant County, in the U.S. state of Washington. The community was named after the island of Corfu, in Greece.

== Geography ==
Corfu is located in the valley of lower Crab Creek. The Saddle Mountains rise abruptly from the valley floor to the immediate south of Corfu to elevations over 2,000 feet.

== History ==
The Chicago, Milwaukee, St. Paul and Pacific Railroad had a stop in Corfu from 1909. At its peak in the 1920s Corfu's population was 131, and the town offered services like a store, gas, school, and train depot. The town's population declined dramatically as highway networks developed and bypassed Corfu. By 1930 the population had fallen by more than 50% from its peak. The rail line was discontinued in 1980.

A post office called Corfu was established in 1910, and remained in operation until 1943.
