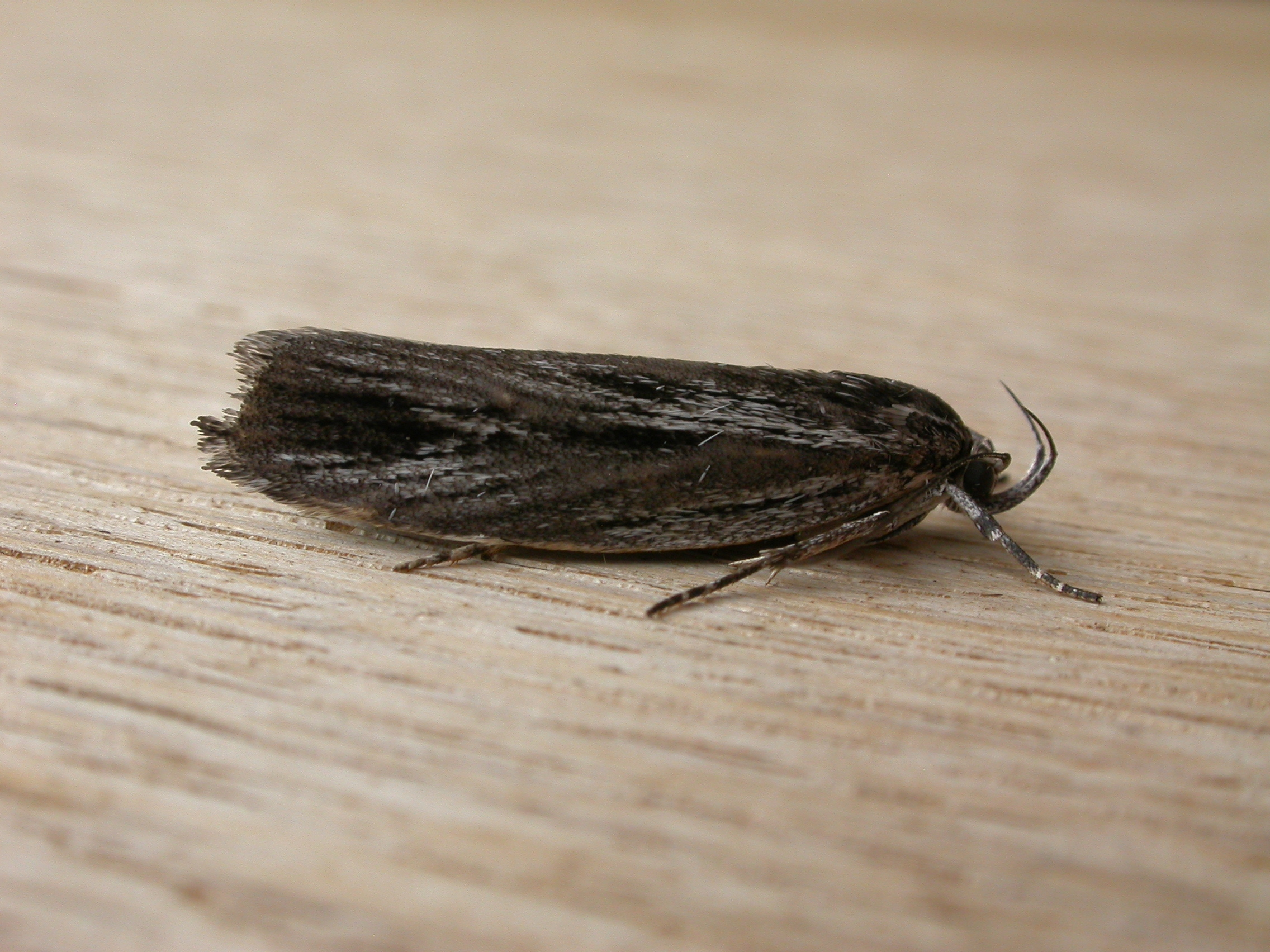
- Procometis phloeodes

Scientific classification
- Kingdom: Animalia
- Phylum: Arthropoda
- Class: Insecta
- Order: Lepidoptera
- Family: Autostichidae
- Subfamily: Autostichinae
- Genus: Procometis; Meyrick, 1890

Synonyms
- Macrozygona Lower, 1903; Hyostola Meyrick, 1908

= Procometis =

Genus of moths

Procometis is a genus of moths in the family Autostichidae.

== Species ==
The species of this genus are:

- Procometis acharma Meyrick, 1908 (from South Africa)
- Procometis acutipennis (Walsingham, 1891) (from Gambia & Congo)
- Procometis aplegiopa Turner, 1904 (from Australia)
- Procometis bisulcata Meyrick, 1890 (from Australia)
- Procometis brunnea (West, 1931) (from Taiwan)
- Procometis coniochersa Meyrick, 1922 (from Australia)
- Procometis diplocentra Meyrick, 1890 (from Australia)
- Procometis genialis Meyrick, 1890 (from Australia)
- Procometis hylonoma Meyrick, 1890 (from Australia)
- Procometis limitata Meyrick, 1911 (from South Africa)
- Procometis lipara Meyrick, 1890 (from Australia)
- Procometis melanthes Turner, 1898 (from Australia)
- Procometis milvina Meyrick, 1914 (from South Africa)
- Procometis mistharma (Meyrick, 1908)
- Procometis monocalama Meyrick, 1890 (from Australia)
- Procometis ochricilia Meyrick, 1921 (from South Africa)
- Procometis oxypora Meyrick, 1908 (from South Africa)
- Procometis periscia Lower, 1903 (from Australia)
- Procometis phloeodes Turner, 1898 (from Australia)
- Procometis sphendonistis (Meyrick, 1908) (from Sri Lanka)
- Procometis spoliatrix (Meyrick, 1916) (from India)
- Procometis stenarga Turner, 1902 (from Australia)
- Procometis terrena Meyrick, 1908 (from Zambia)
- Procometis trochala Meyrick, 1908 (from Sri Lanka)
