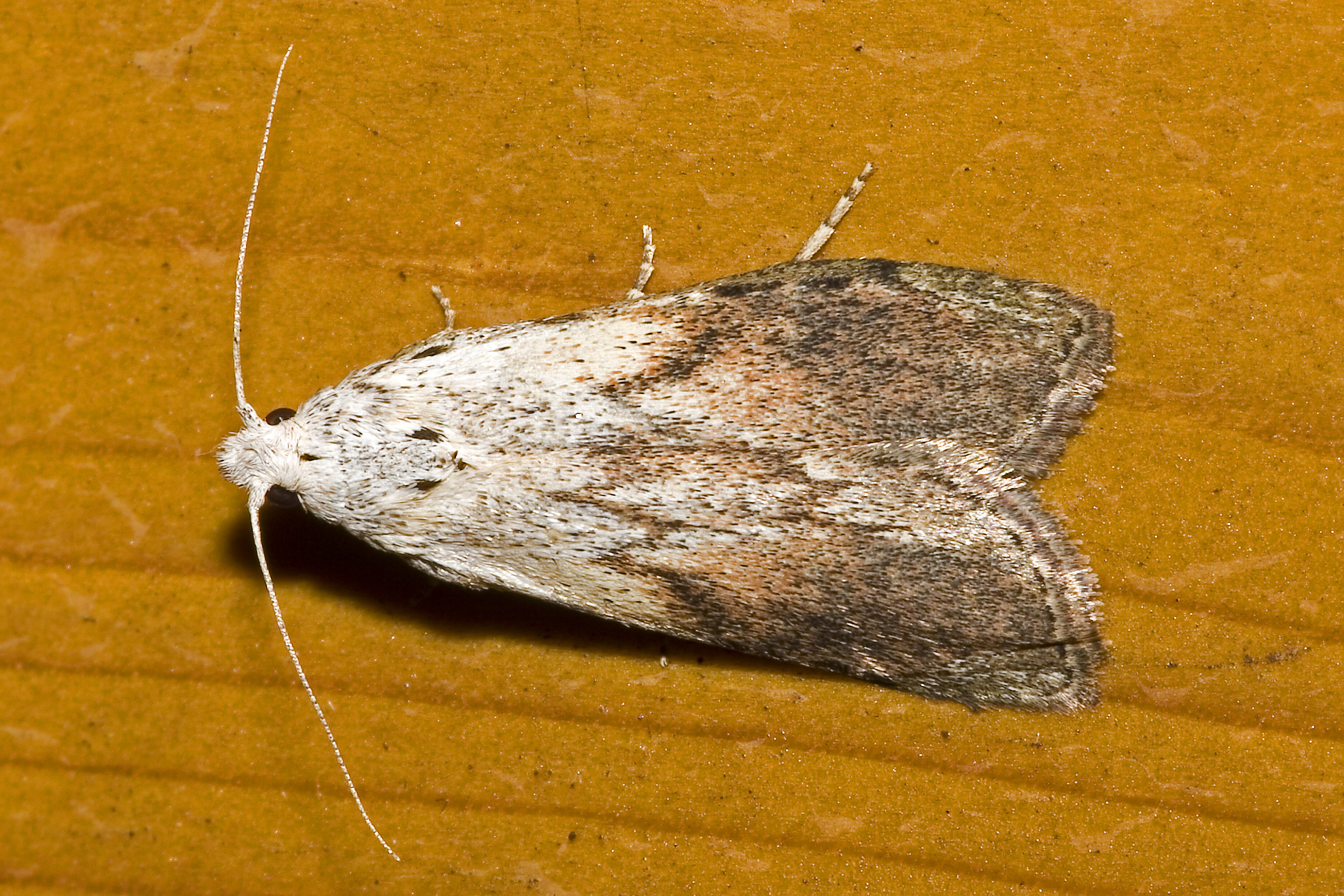
- Adult male
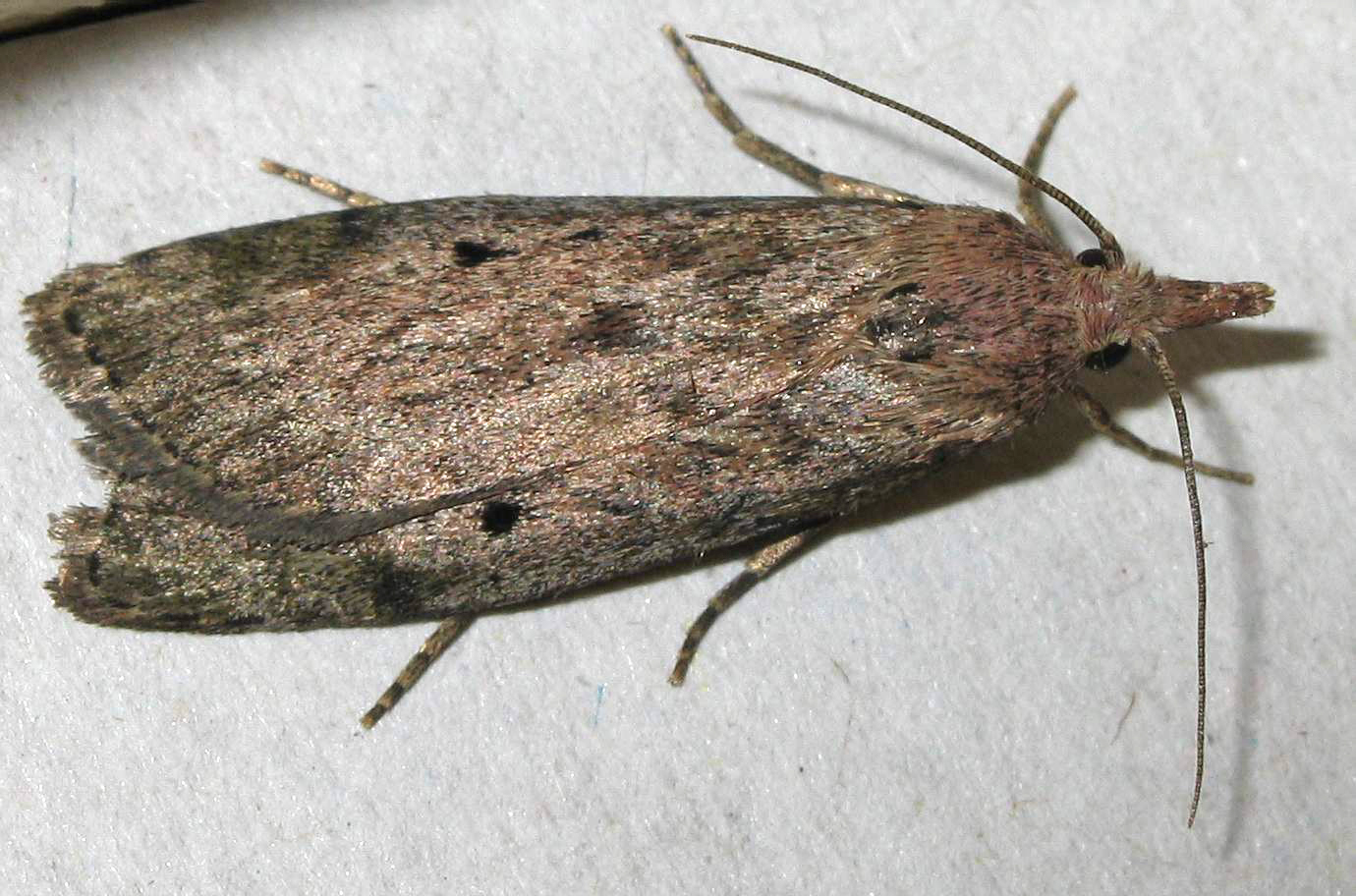
- Adult female

Scientific classification
- Kingdom: Animalia
- Phylum: Arthropoda
- Class: Insecta
- Order: Lepidoptera
- Family: Pyralidae
- Genus: Aphomia
- Species: A. sociella

Binomial name
- Aphomia sociella (Linnaeus, 1758)

Synonyms
- Numerous, see text

= Aphomia sociella =

Bee moth

Species of moth

Aphomia sociella, also known as the bee moth and the bumble bee wax moth, is a small moth of the family Pyralidae (snout moths) and subfamily Galleriinae. Its body and forewings are typically reddish brown, tan, or dark green in color and females have a dark spot in the center of each forewing. The bee moth is native to Europe and are named "bee moths" because they seek out nests of bees and wasps to lay their eggs. Aphomia sociella are considered a pest because the bee moth larvae severely damage commercial bee hives. Bee moths are also studied for their unique mating ritual which includes a release of pheromones from both the male and the female along with an ultrasonic signal emitted through the male's tymbals.

== Description ==
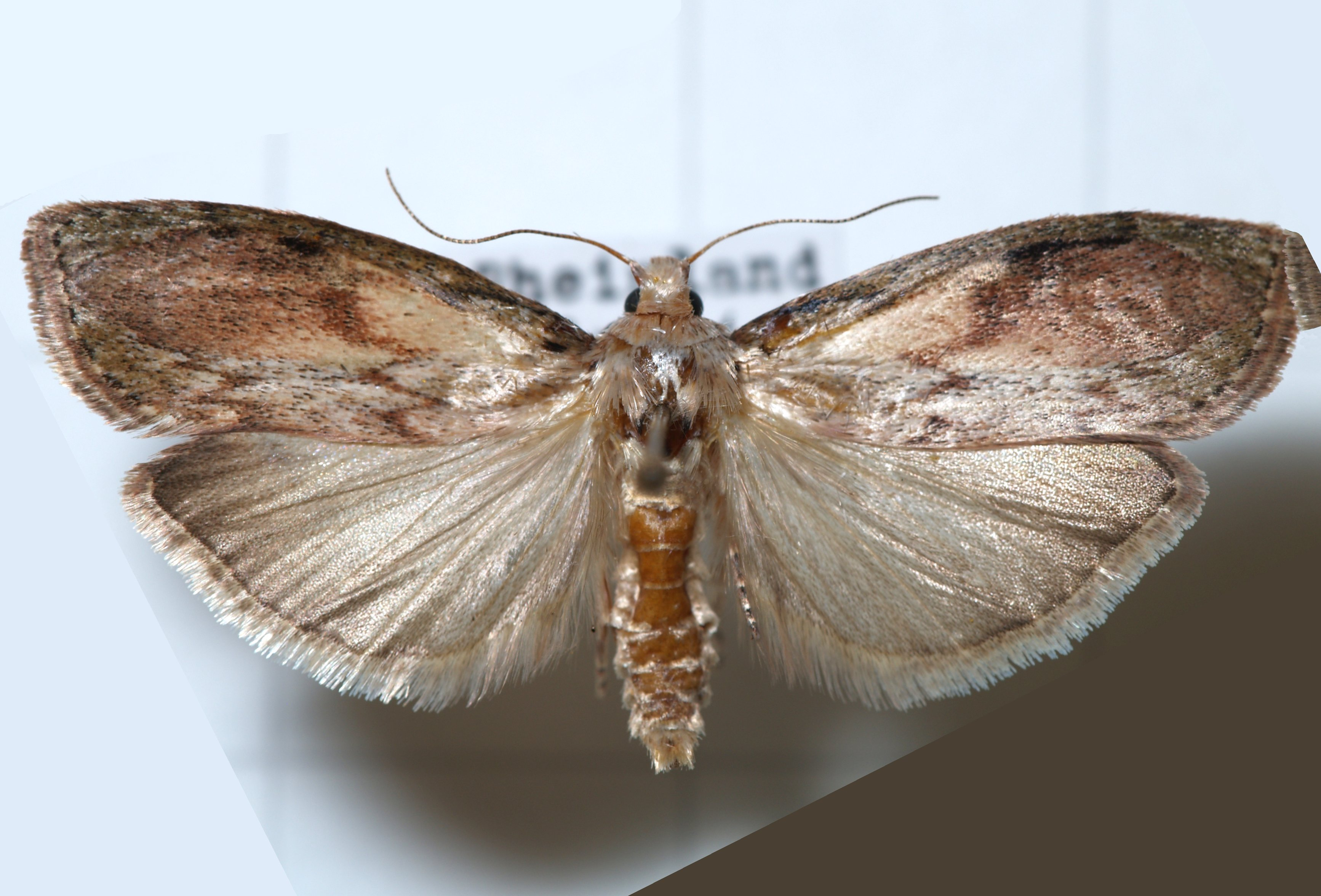
View of Aphomia sociella wingspan

The adult bee moth has a wingspan of 18-40 millimetres (0.71-1.57 inches). The body and forewings are typically reddish brown, tan, or dark green in color. This species is an example of sexual dimorphism where the male moths are generally more brightly colored and more distinctly patterned compared to the female moths. The females also contain a dark spot on the center of each of their forewings.

== Geographic range ==
The bee moth is commonly found in Europe, Britain, and Asia. In North America, the bee moth has been spotted in various states such as California, Utah, New York, Virginia, and Connecticut. This moth flies from June to August in the temperate parts of its range, e.g. Belgium and The Netherlands.

== Parental care ==
=== Oviposition ===
The bee moth is a pest of bumblebees, wasps, and—on rare occasions—even mice. Females prefer to lay their eggs in more exposed and elevated nests of various species of Bombus and Vespine wasps. It is uncommon for a bee moth to seek out nests that are closer to the ground.

== Food resources ==
=== Larvae ===
Bee moth larvae are known to feed on the host eggs, larvae, and pupae left unprotected by the bumble bees and wasps. Bee moth larvae will also feed on pollen, honey, and any waste that they find in the nest.

== Life history ==
=== Egg ===
Females are attracted to the odors of active bumble bee nests and a female will lay up to 100 eggs once it finds a nest that it prefers. The defenses of host colonies tend to increase during the summer; therefore, emergence from the eggs will typically occur in the early summer between March and July in order to take advantage of the temporary weakness of their hosts.

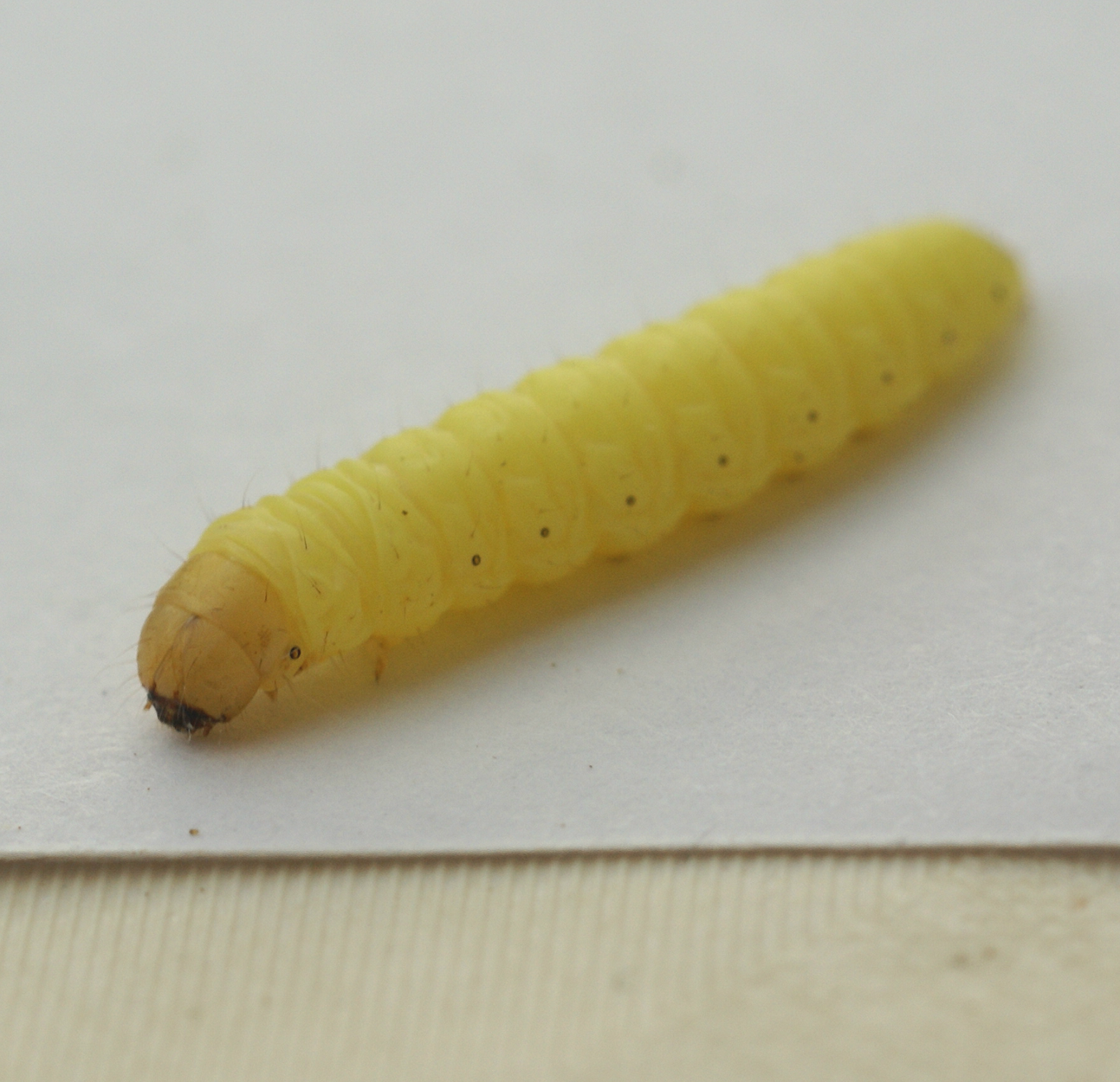
larva

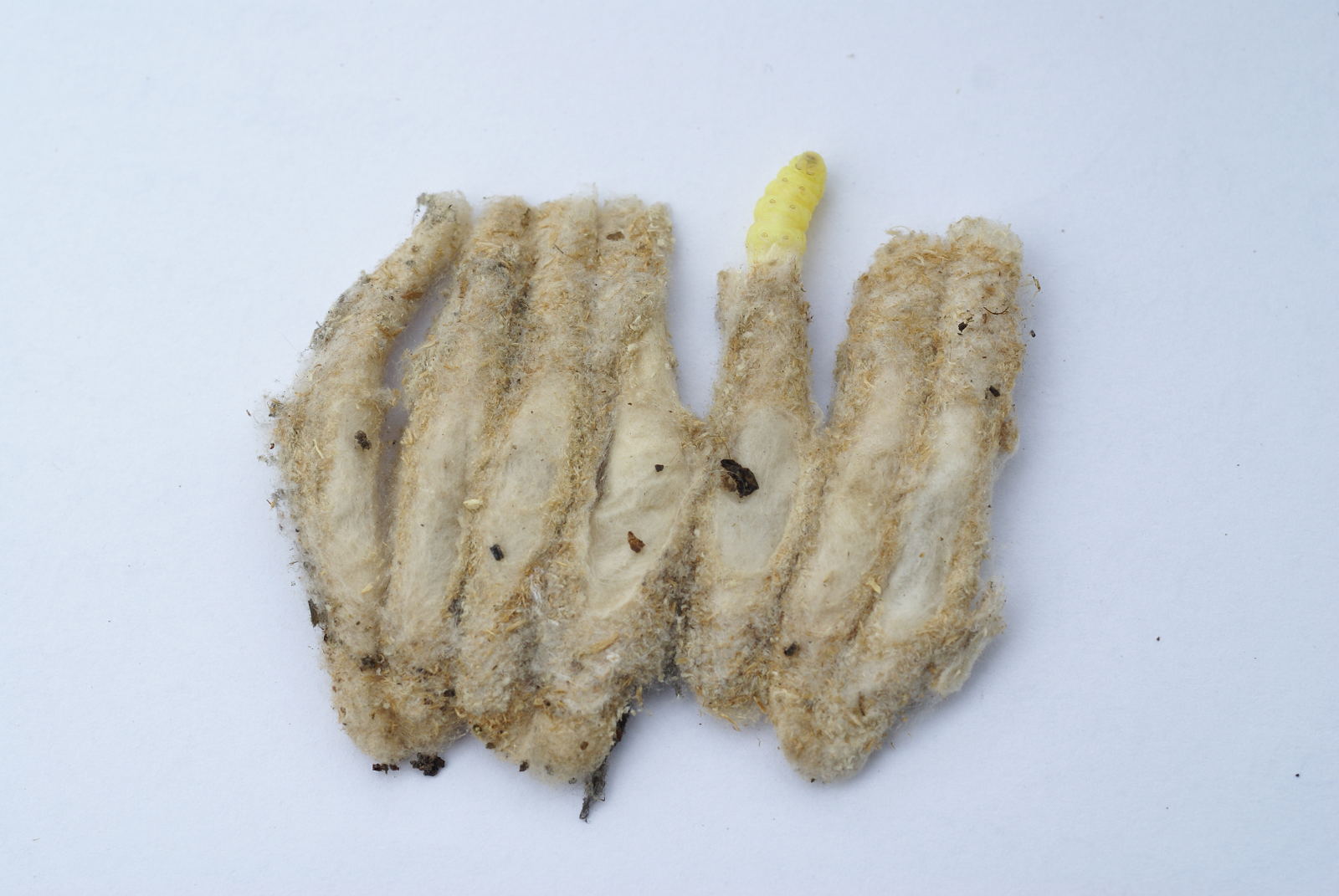
larva in cocoon

=== Larvae ===
Larvae are typically yellow in color and have a length of 22–30 mm. They begin by spinning a silk around themselves for protection and then proceed to feed on the surrounding environment including the pollen and honey within the nest, stored food, and meconia. The larvae tend to tunnel throughout the nest looking for food all the while destroying large amounts of the nest around them.

== Parasitic moths ==
=== Host ===
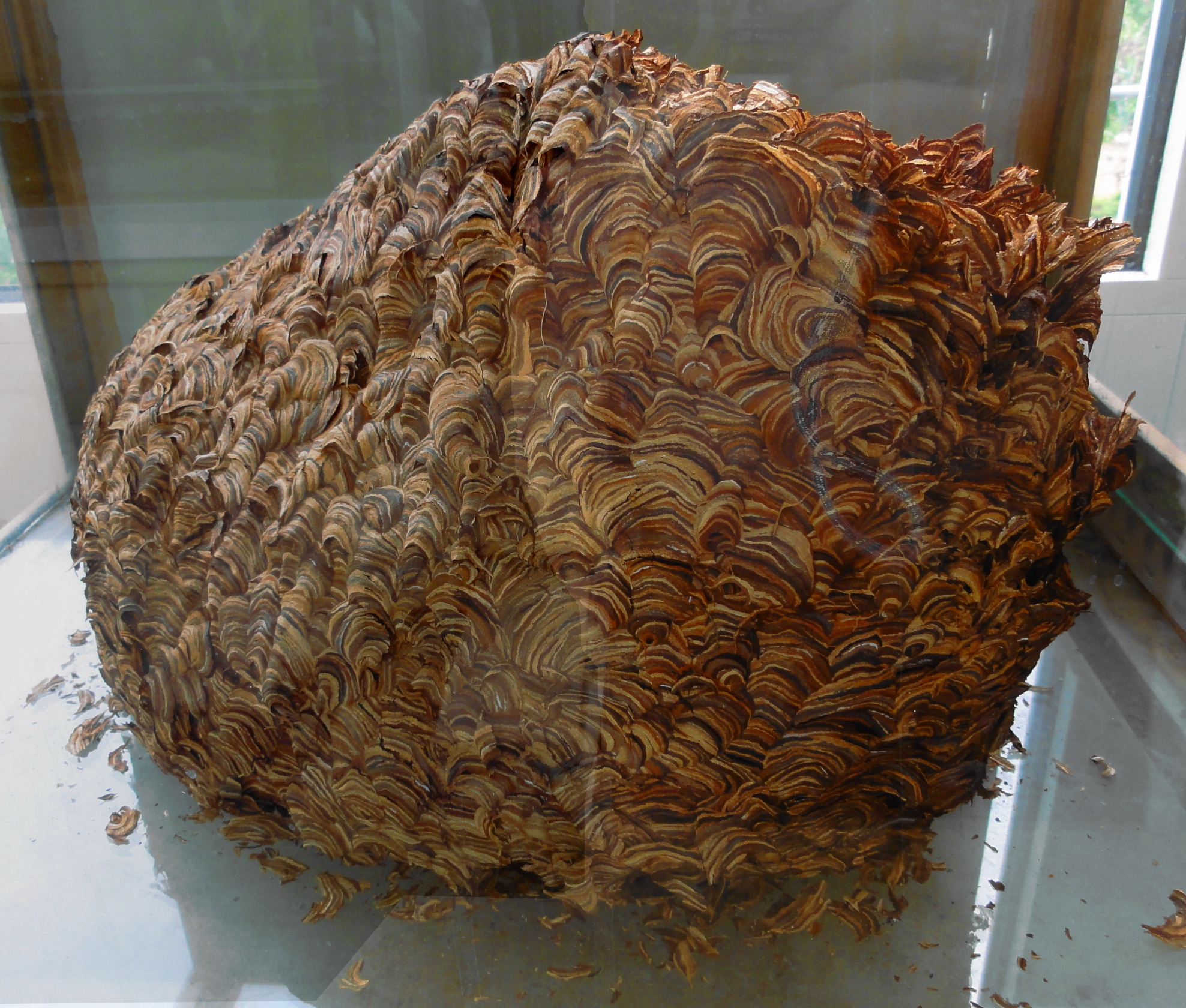
Aphomia sociella will use the nest of Vespula germanica as a host nest.

Female Aphomia sociella have been known to lay eggs in a wide variety of bumble bee, hornet, and wasp nests including the bald-faced hornet (Dolichovespula maculata), the common aerial yellowjacket (D. arenaria), the German wasp (Vespula germanica), and the buff-tailed bumblebee (Bombus terrestris). Coexistence between the bee moth and its host is possible, especially in situations where the host wasps will tend to expand their nests downwards and so leaving the Aphomia sociella larvae to feed on the upper levels. In short, a large nest is able to accommodate both species.

=== Mechanisms of overcoming host species ===
The larvae of the Aphomia sociella will spin a strong silk to protect itself while it feeds. This silk is dense and difficult to penetrate and shields the larvae from the potentially harmful bees and wasps.

== Protective behavior ==
If perturbed or threatened, an adult bee moth will fall to the ground and pretend to be dead by lying on its back in the exact form in which it landed. This is beneficial when infiltrating a host wasp or bumblebee nest as the host will be less likely to attack if it believes that the moth is dead.

== Mating ==
=== Male/male interactions ===
Male sex pheromones can serve to ward off other competing males by either direct repulsion from the odor or by causing the females to stop their own calling behavior of wing fanning. Males have also been shown to physically attack other competing males for territory in the mating process.

=== Female/male interactions ===
==== Pheromones ====
Male and female bee moths are both capable of releasing pheromones in order to attract the opposite sex. The females release a pheromone which contains Hexan-1-ol, 6,10,14-trimethylpentadecan-2-ol, and 6,10,14-trimethylpentadecan-2-one. The two compounds hexan-1-ol and TMPD-one serve to boost the strength of the TMPD-ol which is shown to cause males to begin their ultrasonic signaling and proceed in the courtship process.

Male bee moths attract females using a sex pheromone which is released from glands in their wings. This pheromone by itself is sufficient to cause female attraction. A major component of this pheromone has been found to be 3,4-Dihydro-9-hydroxy-3-methylisocoumarin (R-mellein).

The honeycombs that bee moth larvae feed on is shown to contain a fungus called Aspergillus ochraceus which is known to produce mellein. Experiments also found the same Asp. ochraceus fungus in the intestines of bee moth larvae which suggests that the sex pheromone of mellein is biosynthesized by a microorganism.

==== Courtship ====
Males begin the courtship process by silently fanning their wings in one second intervals followed by half a second of rest. At the same time the males will also release their sex pheromones which has a floral odor that triggers a flying or walking response in females. When a female approaches a male bee moth, the male will begin the next step in its courtship process which includes walking, wing fanning, and "courting songs" which are ultrasonic sounds emitted from the male's tegula. The female will then respond to the male by also walking, wing fanning, and emitting its own courtship pheromones. After the female assumes a copulation position, the male can proceed to mate. If the female is repeatedly unreceptive to the male's courtship, the male will revert to the first step of its courtship ritual and try again with another female. Other variables, such as female wing-beat sounds and substrate vibrations may also play a part in the courtship process.

== Hearing ==
=== Sound generation ===
Aphomia sociella males generate ultrasonic emissions in the courtship rituals during mating. These sounds are generated from wing movements that create high-frequency oscillations of the tegular tymbals. These tymbals are located on the anterior part of the tegulae underneath the patagium sclerite. These ultrasonic emissions are not only emitted when in the presence of females, but also in the presence of other males as well. If a competing male is introduced into the territory of a bee moth that is in the process of courting, the resident is shown to approach and even attack the intruder. Eventually the two males will take up new positions and begin calling for females again.

The ultrasonic signals produced by Aphomia sociella males consist of short chirps which are separated by random periods of silence. The average duration of one of these courting/rival songs is approximately 1122 milliseconds and are estimated to have a maximum range of 0.45 meters.

Aphomia sociella females lack the tymbals that males possess and so are not able to produce ultrasonic emissions.

== Synonyms ==
This moth has been described as a new species several times, which has yielded a considerable number of alternate scientific names which are all invalid as junior synonyms nowadays:

- Aphomia asiatica Caradja, 1916
- Aphomia eritrella Della Beffa, 1941
- Aphomia lanceolata Dufrane, 1930
- Aphomia minor Dufrane, 1930
- Aphomia pedemontella Della Beffa, 1941
- Aphomia rufinella Krulikowski, 1909
- Aphomia virescens Skala, 1929
- Crambus colonatus Haworth, 1809 (unjustified emendation)
- Crambus colonum Fabricius, 1798 (unjustified emendation)
- Lithosia socia Fabricius, 1798 (unjustified emendation)
- Tinea colonella Linnaeus, 1758
- Tinea sociella Linnaeus, 1758
- Tinea tribunella [Denis & Schiffermüller], 1775
