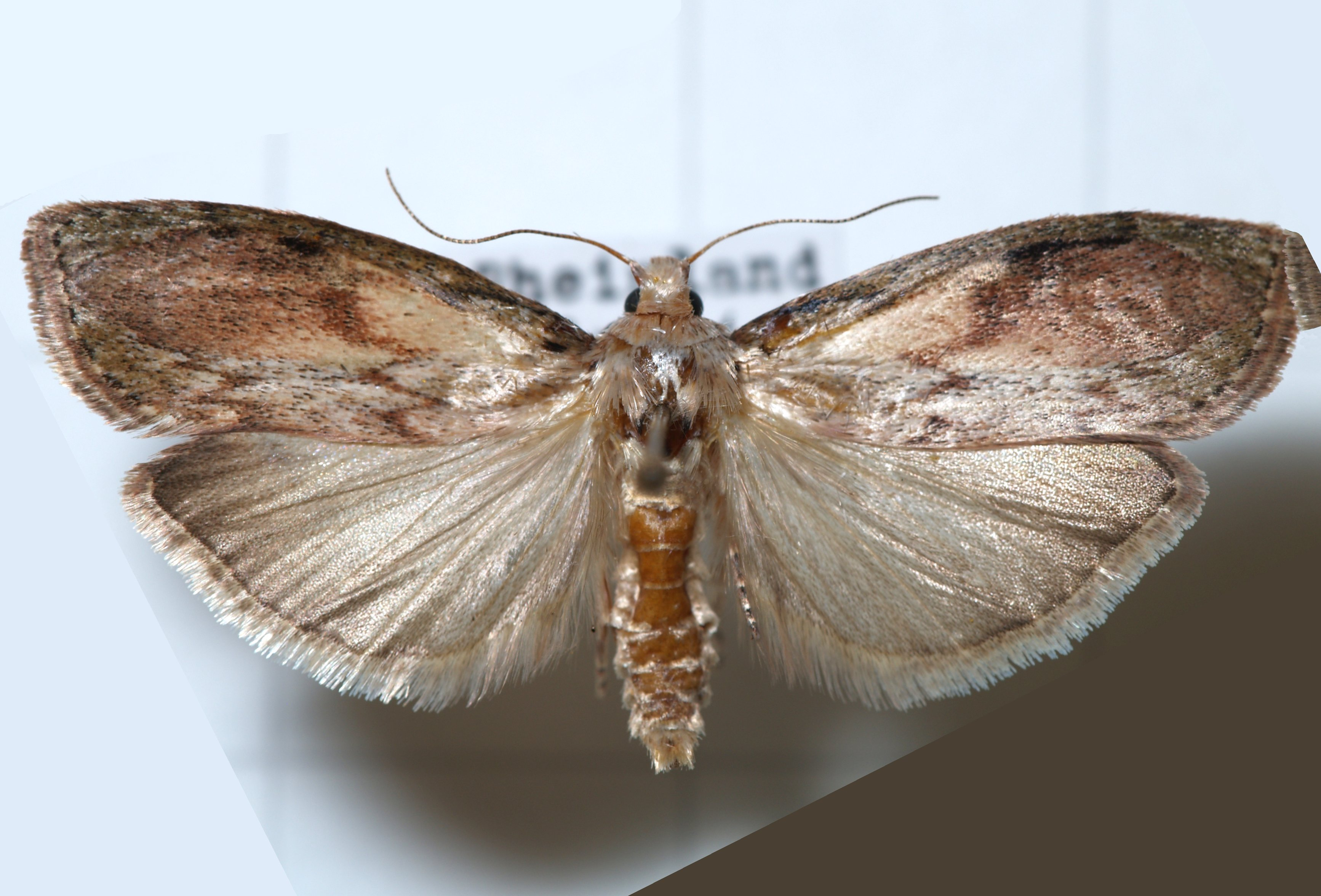
- Bee moth (A. sociella) specimen

Scientific classification
- Kingdom: Animalia
- Phylum: Arthropoda
- Clade: Pancrustacea
- Class: Insecta
- Order: Lepidoptera
- Family: Pyralidae
- Subfamily: Galleriinae
- Tribe: Tirathabini
- Genus: Aphomia; Hübner, 1825

Synonyms
- Aphomoea J. L. R. Agassiz, 1847; Arenipses Hampson in Ragonot, 1901; Arenipses Rebel, 1901; Ilithyia Berthold in Latreille, 1827; Ilythia Stephens, 1829; Melia Curtis, 1828; Melissoblaptes Zeller, 1839

= Aphomia =

Genus of moths

Aphomia is a genus of small moths belonging to the family Pyralidae. Some breed in the nests of bees, where their caterpillars are parasitic feeders of wax, honey and pollen.

== Species ==
- Aphomia argentia Whalley, 1964
- Aphomia baryptera (Lower, 1901)
- Aphomia burellus (Holland, 1900)
- Aphomia caffralis Hampson, 1917
- Aphomia curvicostella (Zerny, 1914)
- Aphomia curvicostellus (Zerny, 1914)
- Aphomia distictella Hampson, 1917
- Aphomia erumpens (Lucas, 1898)
- Aphomia euchelliellus (Snellen, 1900)
- Aphomia foedella (Zeller, 1839)
- Aphomia fulminalis (Zeller, 1872)
- Aphomia fuscolimbella (Ragonot, 1887)
- Aphomia grisea Turati, 1913
- Aphomia homochroa (Turner, 1905)
- Aphomia isodesma (Meyrick, 1886)
- Aphomia lolotialis (Caradja, 1927)
- Aphomia melli (Caradja & Meyrick, 1933)
- Aphomia monochroa (Hampson, 1912)
- Aphomia murciella (Zerny, 1914)
- Aphomia ochracea Hampson, 1917
- Aphomia odontella (Hampson, 1898)
- Aphomia opticogramma (Meyrick, 1935)
- Aphomia pimelodes Meyrick, 1936
- Aphomia poliocyma Turner, 1937
- Aphomia pygmealis (Caradja & Meyrick, 1935)
- Aphomia sabella (Hampson in Ragonot, 1901)
- Aphomia sopozhnikovi (Krulikovsky, 1909
- Aphomia sociella (Linnaeus, 1758) – bee moth
- Aphomia spoliatrix Christoph, 1881
- Aphomia taiwanalis (Shibuya, 1928)
- Aphomia terrenella Zeller, 1848
- Aphomia unicolor (Staudinger, 1880)
- Aphomia variegatella (Hampson in Ragonot, 1901)
- Aphomia vinotincta (Hampson, 1908)
- Aphomia zelleri de Joannis, 1932

The former A. pachytera is now Heteromicta pachytera.
