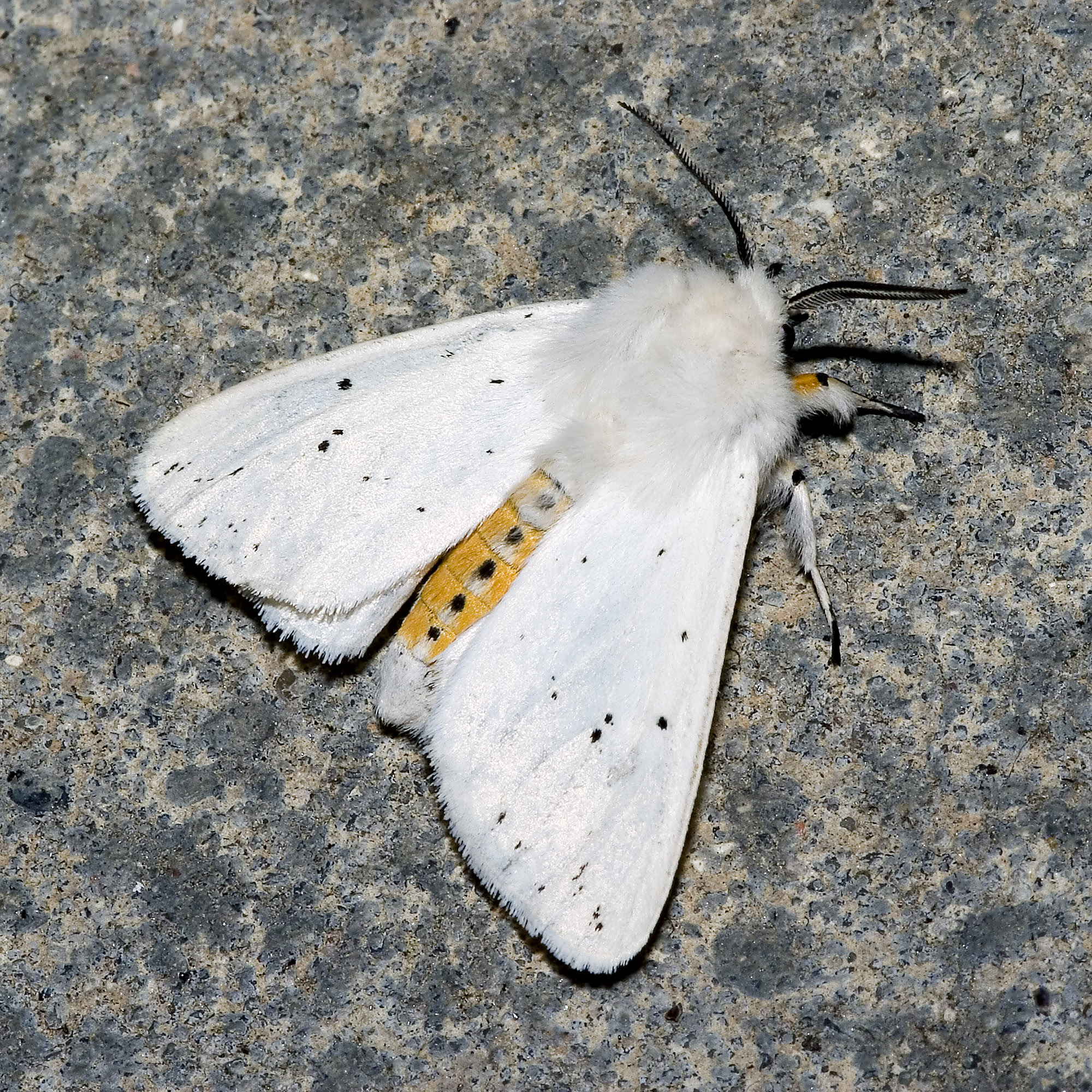
- White ermine, Spilosoma lubricipedum

Scientific classification
- Kingdom: Animalia
- Phylum: Arthropoda
- Class: Insecta
- Order: Lepidoptera
- Superfamily: Noctuoidea
- Family: Erebidae
- Subfamily: Arctiinae
- Tribe: Arctiini
- Subtribe: Spilosomina; Kirby, 1892

= Spilosomina =

Subtribe of moths

The Spilosomina are a subtribe of tiger moths in the tribe Arctiini, which is part of the family Erebidae.

== Taxonomy ==
The subtribe was previously classified as the tribe Spilosomini of the family Arctiidae.

== Genera ==
The following genera are included in the subtribe. Numerous arctiine genera have not yet been assigned to a tribe, so this genus list may be incomplete.

- Aethalida
- Acantharctia
- Afraloa
- Afroarctia
- Afrojavanica
- Afromurzinia
- Afrospilarctia
- Afrowatsonius
- Alexicles
- Allanwatsonia
- Alpenus
- Aloa
- Alphaea with two subgenera: Flavalphaea and Nayaca
- Amsacta
- Amsactarctia
- Amsactoides
- Andala
- Arachnis
- Ardices with a subgenus Australemyra
- Areas with a subgenus Melanareas
- Argyarctia with a subgenus Fangalphaea
- Binna
- Bucaea
- Canararctia
- Carcinarctia
- Caribarctia
- Catenina see Laguerre, 2023
- Cheliosea
- Chilesia
- Chionarctia
- Cladarctia
- Creataloum
- Creatonotos with a subgenus Phissama
- Cymaroa
- Dasyarctia
- Defreinarctia
- Detoulgoetia
- Diaphora
- Dionychoscelis
- Disparctia
- Dubatolovia
- Eospilarctia with a subgenus Pareospilarctia
- Epatolmis
- Epilacydes
- Estigmene
- Eudiaphora
- Eyralpenus with a subgenus Pareyralpenus
- Fangarctia
- Fodinoidea
- Fulvocompe see Laguerre, 2023
- Heliozona: position is questionable
- Hollowaya
- Hollowayana
- Hyarias
- Hypercompe
- Hyphantria
- Juxtarctia
- Kenyarctia
- Kiriakoffalia
- Lemyra with a subgenus Thyrgorina
- Leptarctia
- Leucaloa
- Lithosarctia with a subgenus Ocnogynodes
- Logunovium
- Madagascarctia
- Maurica
- Menegites
- Metacrias
- Micralarctia
- Microcompe see Laguerre, 2023
- Micraloa
- Monstruncusarctia
- Murzinarctia
- Murzinoria
- Murzinowatsonia
- Nannoarctia with a subgenus Pseudorajendra
- Nebrarctia
- Nicetosoma
- Ocnogyna
- Olepa
- Orhantarctia
- Oxyptera see Laguerre, 2023
- Palaeomolis
- Pangora
- Paracles
- Paralacydes
- Paralpenus
- Paramaenas
- Paramsacta
- Paraspilarctia with a subgenus Kishidarctia
- Pericaliella
- Phaos
- Phlyctaenogastra
- Phragmatobia
- Poecilarctia
- Popoudina with a subgenus Pseudopopoudina
- Pseudophragmatobia
- Pseudoradiarctia
- Pyrrharctia
- Radiarctia
- Rajendra
- Rhagonis - often included in Spilosoma
- Rhodareas: probably a subgenus of Spilarctia
- Rhodogastria
- Saenura
- Satara with a subgenus Owadasatara
- Seirarctia
- Seydelia
- Sinowatsonia
- Somatrichia
- Spilaethalida
- Spilarctia - often included in Spilosoma
- Spilosoma
- Stenucha
- Stictocompe see Laguerre, 2023
- Streltzovia
- Tajigyna
- Tatargina with a subgenus Hindargina
- Teracotona with two subgenera Neoteracotona and Pseudoteracotona
- Testaptera see Laguerre, 2023
- Toulgarctia
- Ustjuzhania
- Watsonarctia
