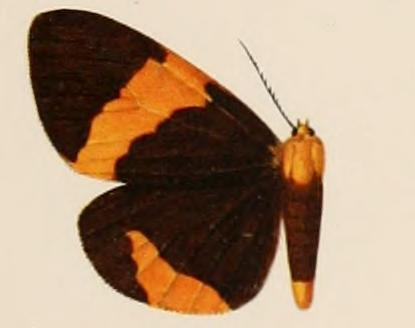
- Noctuoidea adults (all dorsal view)

Scientific classification
- Domain: Eukaryota
- Kingdom: Animalia
- Phylum: Arthropoda
- Class: Insecta
- Order: Lepidoptera
- Superfamily: Noctuoidea
- Family: Erebidae
- Subfamily: Arctiinae
- Subtribe: Spilosomina
- Genus: Heliozona; Hampson, 1901

Type species
- Satara lianga Semper, 1899

= Heliozona =

Genus of moths

Heliozona is a genus of tiger moths in the family Erebidae. The genus contains two species: Heliozona lianga in Mindanao in the Philippines and Heliozona dulla in New Guinea.

== Taxonomy ==
The genus is probably related to Satara Walker, [1865] 1864.

== Species ==
- Heliozona dulla (Pagenstecher, 1886)
- Heliozona lianga (Semper, 1899)
