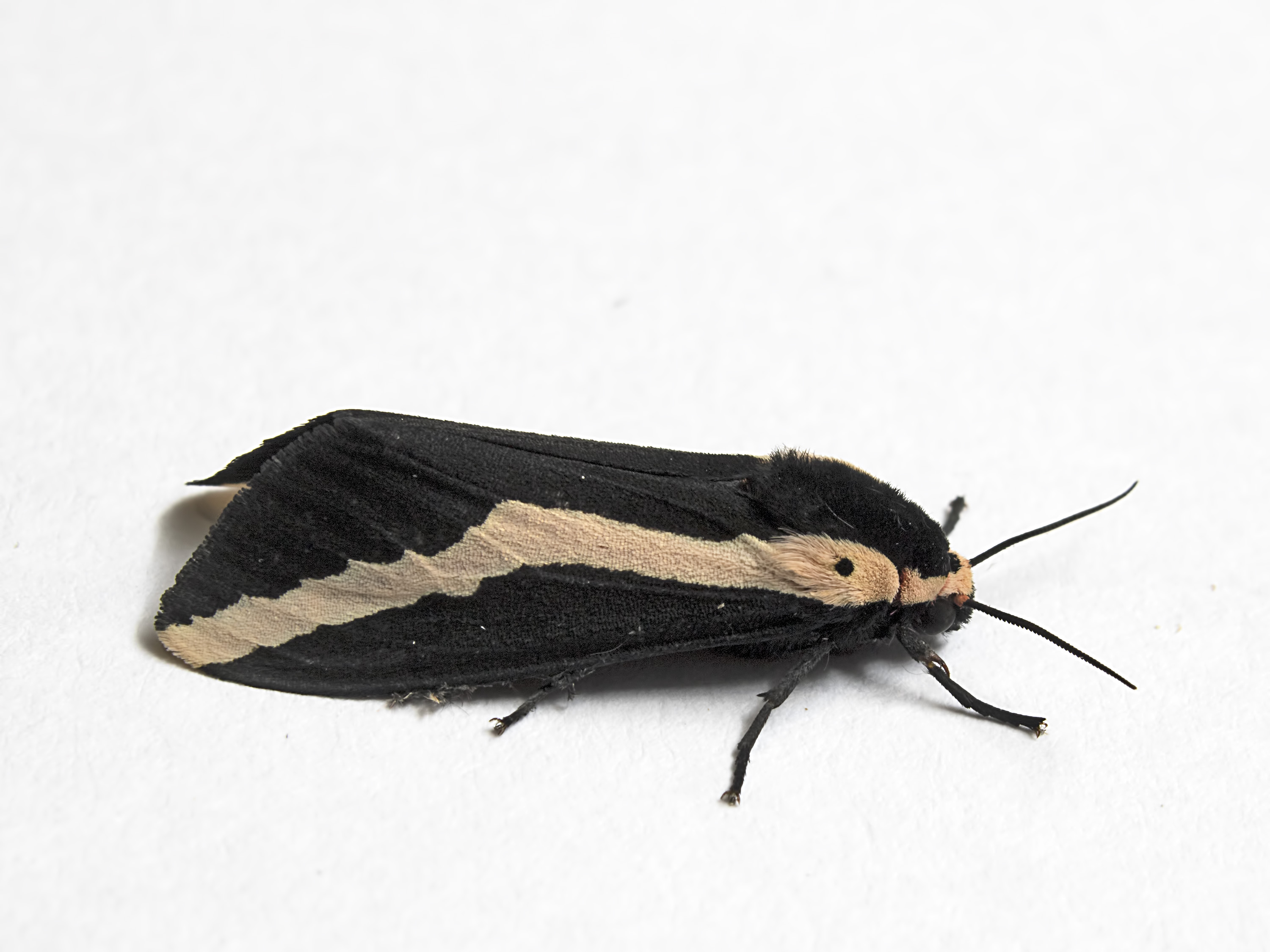

Scientific classification
- Kingdom: Animalia
- Phylum: Arthropoda
- Clade: Pancrustacea
- Class: Insecta
- Order: Lepidoptera
- Superfamily: Noctuoidea
- Family: Erebidae
- Subfamily: Arctiinae
- Genus: Rajendra
- Species: R. perrottetii

Binomial name
- Rajendra perrottetii (Guérin-Méneville, [1844])

Synonyms
- Chelonia perrottetii Guérin-Méneville, 1844; Rajendra vittata Moore, 1879; Alphaea vittata; Estigmene vittata

= Rajendra perrottetii =

Species of moth

Rajendra perrottetii is a moth in the family Erebidae. It was described by Félix Édouard Guérin-Méneville in 1844. It is found in India. The species is similar to Rajendra biguttata, which is also found in Sri Lanka, by narrower white fascia which runs from base to the apex. Where R. biguttata has much broader white fascia.
