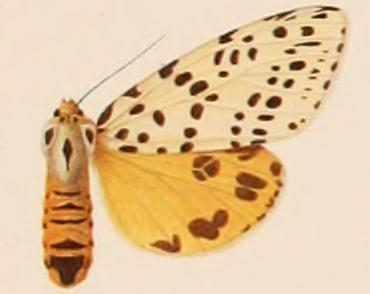

Scientific classification
- Domain: Eukaryota
- Kingdom: Animalia
- Phylum: Arthropoda
- Class: Insecta
- Order: Lepidoptera
- Superfamily: Noctuoidea
- Family: Erebidae
- Subfamily: Arctiinae
- Genus: Juxtarctia
- Species: J. multiguttata

Binomial name
- Juxtarctia multiguttata (Walker, 1855)

Synonyms
- Hypercompa multiguttata Walker, 1855; Spilosoma multiguttata; Deiopeia spilosomoides Walker, 1864; Deiopeia pardalina Walker, 1864; Diacrisia multiguttata major Rothschild, 1910; Diacrisia multiguttata pallidior Rothschild, 1910; Juxtarctia bispinuatus Kirti & Kaleka, 2002; Juxtarctia monospinuatus Kirti & Kaleka, 2002; Spilarctia multicornutiata Kaleka, 2005; Spilarctia nirmalae Kaleka, 2005; Spilarctia himachalensis Kaleka, 2005; Spilarctia valvata Kaleka, 2005

= Juxtarctia multiguttata =

Species of moth

AwesomeAKO, editor

Juxtarctia multiguttata is a polymorphic tiger-moth in the subfamily Arctiinae, endemic for Himalayas. It is known from India: north-west Himalayas, Sikkim, Assam; Nepal; Bhutan; Myanmar; China: Tibet within western slopes of the Himalayas; Indochina (from Thailand to Vietnam and Cambodia).
