= Madagascarctia madagascariensis =

Scientific classification
- Kingdom: Animalia
- Phylum: Arthropoda
- Clade: Pancrustacea
- Class: Insecta
- Order: Lepidoptera
- Superfamily: Noctuoidea
- Family: Erebidae
- Subfamily: Arctiinae
- Genus: Madagascarctia
- Species: M. madagascariensis

Binomial name
- Madagascarctia madagascariensis Butler, 1882

Species of moth

Madagascarctia madagascariensis is a species of moth in the family Erebidae. It was described by Arthur Gardiner Butler in 1882. This species has been documented in Madagascar and The Gambia.
