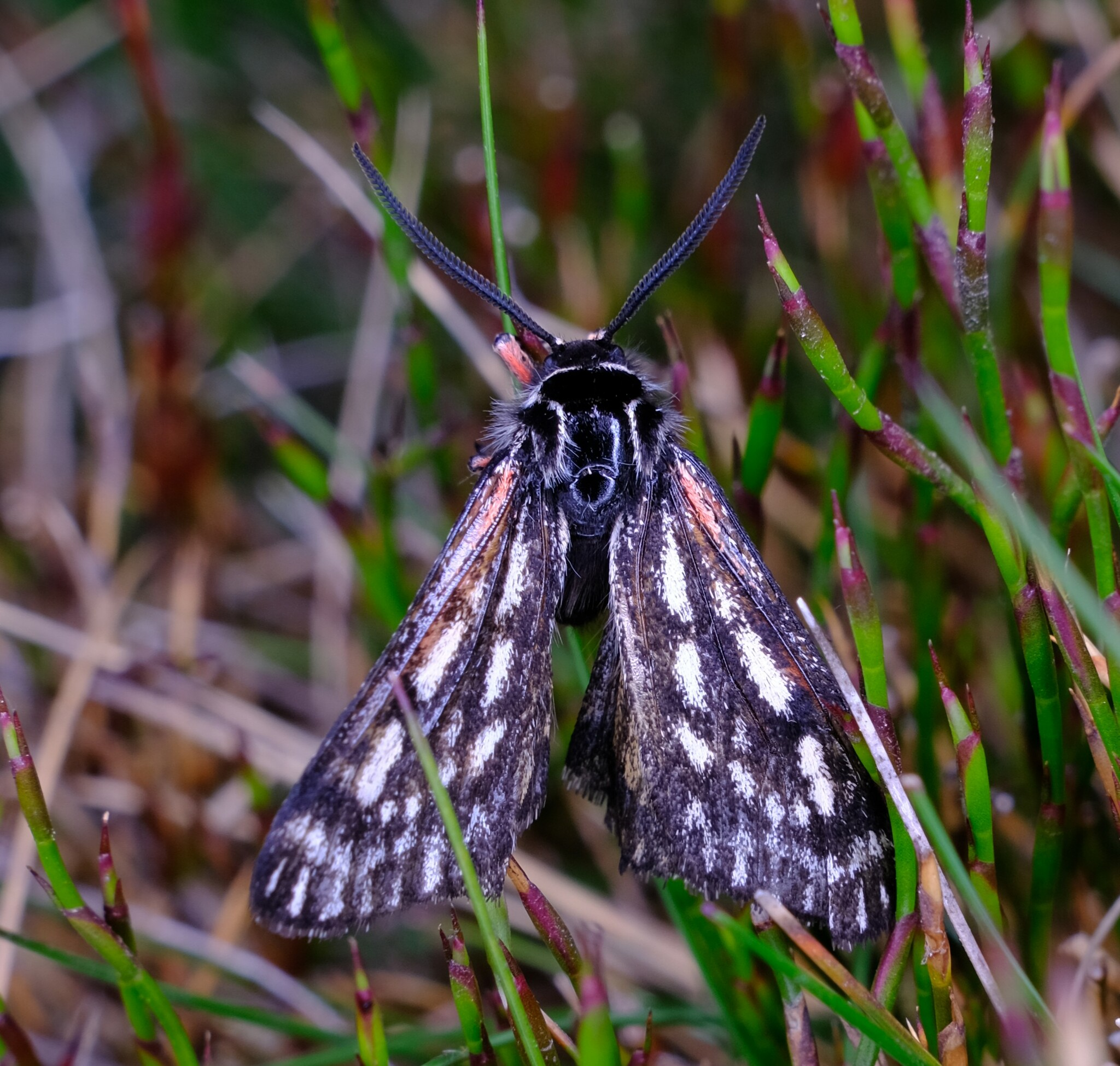

Scientific classification
- Kingdom: Animalia
- Phylum: Arthropoda
- Class: Insecta
- Order: Lepidoptera
- Superfamily: Noctuoidea
- Family: Erebidae
- Subfamily: Arctiinae
- Genus: Phaos
- Species: P. interfixa

Binomial name
- Phaos interfixa Walker, 1855

Synonyms
- Arctia pulchella Herrich-Schäffer, 1855; Estigmene rufa Rothschild, 1914; Phaos acmena Turner, 1926

= Phaos interfixa =

Species of moth

Phaos interfixa is a species of moth in the family Erebidae. It was originally described by Francis Walker in 1855. It is found in Tasmania, Australia.
