= Stictocompe =

Scientific classification
- Kingdom: Animalia
- Phylum: Arthropoda
- Clade: Pancrustacea
- Class: Insecta
- Order: Lepidoptera
- Superfamily: Noctuoidea
- Family: Erebidae
- Subfamily: Arctiinae
- Subtribe: Spilosomina
- Genus: Stictocompe; Laguerre, 2023

Type species
- Ecpantheria oslari Rothschild, 1910

Genus of moths

Oxyptera is a genus of tiger moths in the family Erebidae that was erected by French entomologist Michel Laguerre in 1883. All of the species in the genus were split from the genus Hypercompe.

== Taxonomy ==
The following species are recognised in the genus Stictocompe:

- Stictocompe albescens (Oberthür, 1881)
- Stictocompe cermelii (Watson, 1977)
- Stictocompe confusa (Druce, 1884)
- Stictocompe oslari (Rothschild, 1910)
- Stictocompe suffusa (Schaus, 1889)
