= Fangarctia =

Scientific classification
- Kingdom: Animalia
- Phylum: Arthropoda
- Clade: Pancrustacea
- Class: Insecta
- Order: Lepidoptera
- Superfamily: Noctuoidea
- Family: Erebidae
- Subfamily: Arctiinae
- Subtribe: Spilosomina
- Genus: Fangarctia; Dubatolov, 2003

Type species
- Spilarctia zhongtiao Fang & Cao, 1984

Genus of moths

Fangarctia is a genus of tiger moths in the family Erebidae. The genus was erected by Vladimir Viktorovitch Dubatolov in 2003. The moths are found in the Yunnan province in southwestern China.

== Species ==
- Fangarctia huizensis (Fang, 2000)
- Fangarctia zhongtiao (Fang & Cao, 1984)
