= Tajigyna =

Scientific classification
- Kingdom: Animalia
- Phylum: Arthropoda
- Clade: Pancrustacea
- Class: Insecta
- Order: Lepidoptera
- Superfamily: Noctuoidea
- Family: Erebidae
- Subfamily: Arctiinae
- Subtribe: Spilosomina
- Genus: Tajigyna; Dubatolov, 1990
- Species: T. gansoni

Binomial name
- Tajigyna gansoni Dubatolov, 1990

Genus of moths

Tajigyna is a monotypic moth genus in the subfamily Arctiinae. Its only species, Tajigyna gansoni, is known from Tajikistan. Both the genus and species were first described by Vladimir Viktorovitch Dubatolov in 1990.
