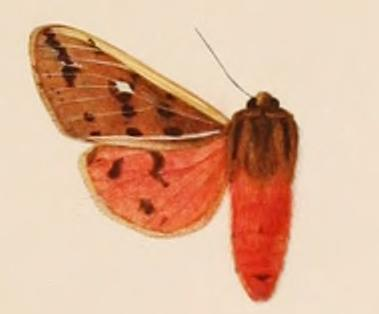
- Spilaethalida turbida turbida
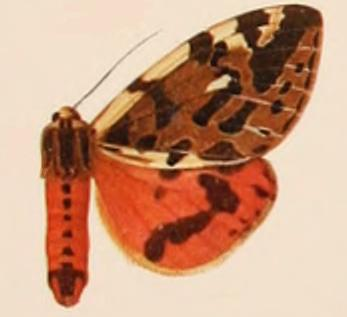
- Spilaethalida turbida woodlarkiana

Scientific classification
- Kingdom: Animalia
- Phylum: Arthropoda
- Clade: Pancrustacea
- Class: Insecta
- Order: Lepidoptera
- Superfamily: Noctuoidea
- Family: Erebidae
- Subfamily: Arctiinae
- Genus: Spilaethalida
- Species: S. turbida

Binomial name
- Spilaethalida turbida (Butler, 1882)

Synonyms
- Spilarctia turbida Butler, 1882; Spilarctia meeki Druce, 1899; Diacrisia turbida montana Rothschild, 1910; Diacrisia turbida woodlarkiana Rothschild, 1910; Diacrisia turbida sordidior Rothschild, 1910; Diacrisia turbida alpina Rothschild, 1914

= Spilaethalida turbida =

Species of moth

Spilaethalida turbida is a moth of the family Erebidae first described by Arthur Gardiner Butler in 1882.

It is endemic to Papua New Guinea, the Bismarck Archipelago, the D'Entrecasteaux Islands, the Trobriand Islands, and the Woodlark Islands.

== Subspecies ==
- Spilaethalida turbida turbida (Bismarck Archipelago)
- Spilaethalida turbida sordidior (Rothschild, 1910) (Papua New Guinea, D'Entrecasteaux Islands)
- Spilaethalida turbida meeki (Druce, 1899) (Trobriand Islands)
- Spilaethalida turbida woodlarkiana (Rothschild, 1910) (Woodlark Islands)
