= Tatargina ceylonensis =

Scientific classification
- Kingdom: Animalia
- Phylum: Arthropoda
- Class: Insecta
- Order: Lepidoptera
- Superfamily: Noctuoidea
- Family: Erebidae
- Subfamily: Arctiinae
- Genus: Tatargina
- Species: T. ceylonensis

Binomial name
- Tatargina ceylonensis (Hampson, 1901)

Synonyms
- Estigmene ceylonensis Hampson, 1901; Rajendra ceylonensis

Species of moth

Tatargina ceylonensis is a moth in the family Erebidae. It was described by George Hampson in 1901. It is found in Sri Lanka.
