= Tatargina sipahi =

Scientific classification
- Domain: Eukaryota
- Kingdom: Animalia
- Phylum: Arthropoda
- Class: Insecta
- Order: Lepidoptera
- Superfamily: Noctuoidea
- Family: Erebidae
- Subfamily: Arctiinae
- Genus: Tatargina
- Species: T. sipahi

Binomial name
- Tatargina sipahi (Moore, 1872)

Synonyms
- Aloa sipahi Moore, 1872; Rajendra sipahi; Alphaea sipahi; Pericallia sipahi

Species of moth

Tatargina sipahi is a moth in the family Erebidae, described by Frederic Moore in 1872. It is native in southern India.
