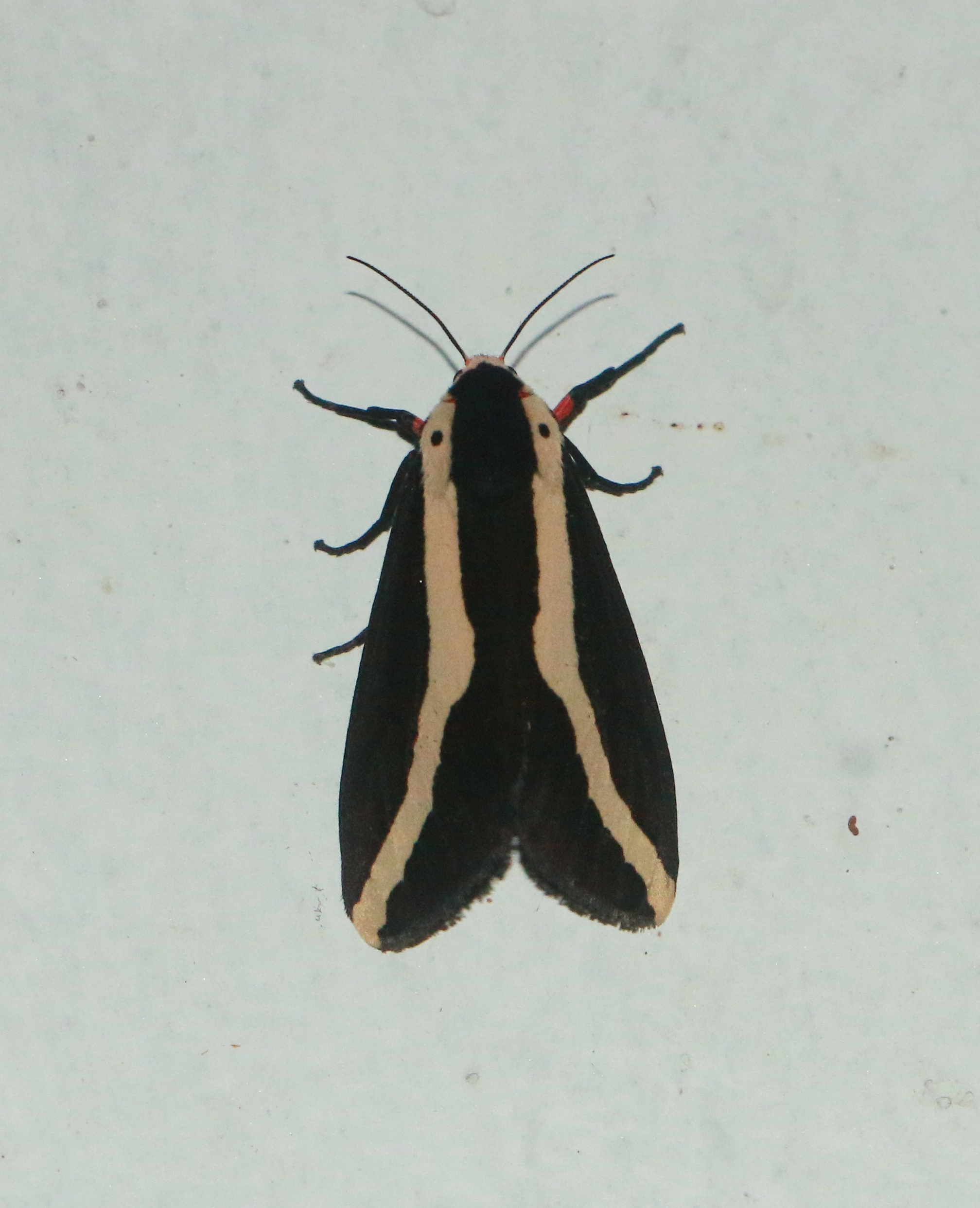
- Rajendra biguttata

Scientific classification
- Domain: Eukaryota
- Kingdom: Animalia
- Phylum: Arthropoda
- Class: Insecta
- Order: Lepidoptera
- Superfamily: Noctuoidea
- Family: Erebidae
- Subfamily: Arctiinae
- Subtribe: Spilosomina
- Genus: Rajendra; Moore, 1879

Type species
- Rajendra lativitta Moore, 1879

= Rajendra (moth) =

Genus of moths

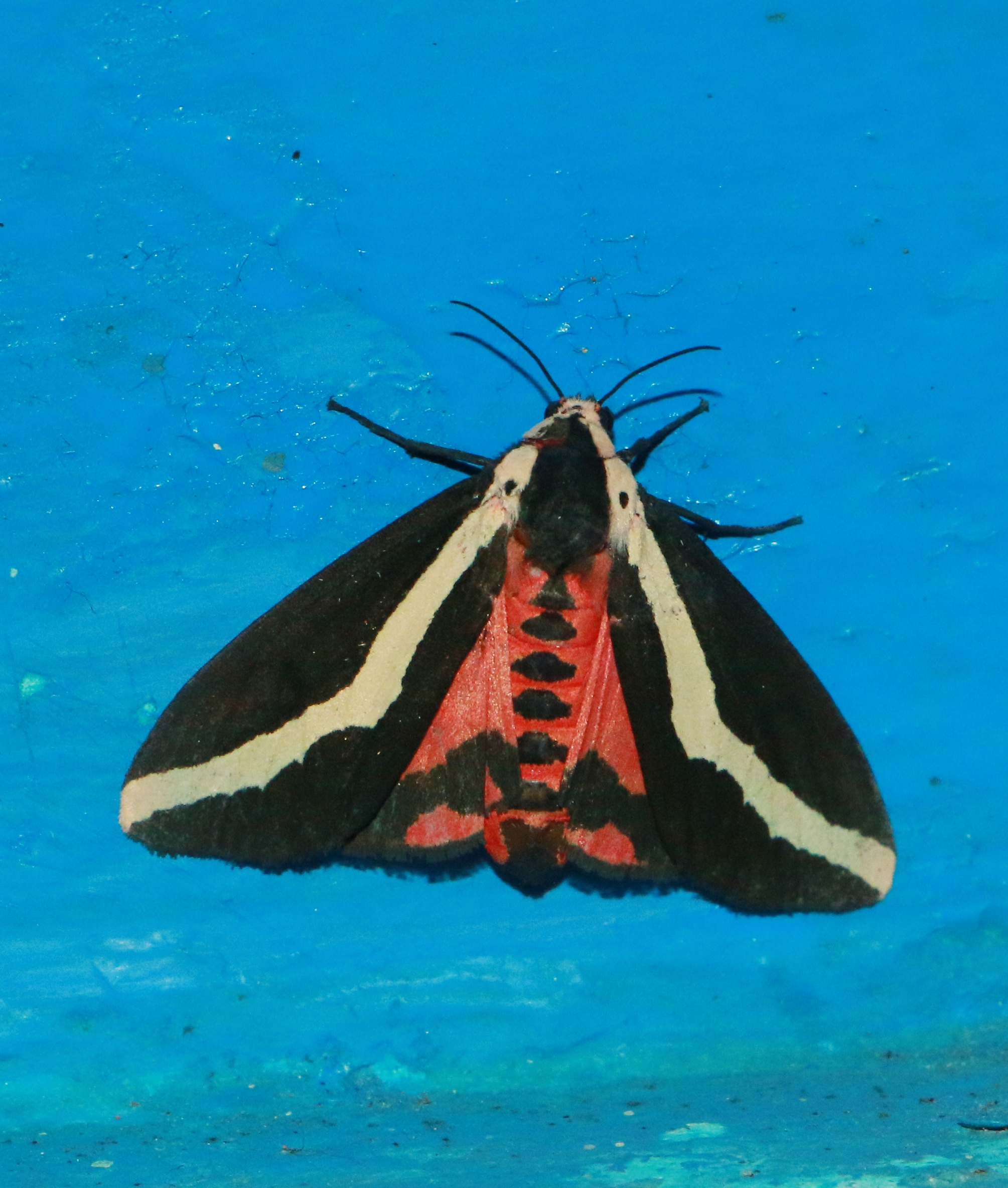
Rajendra species moth from koottanad Palakkad Kerala India

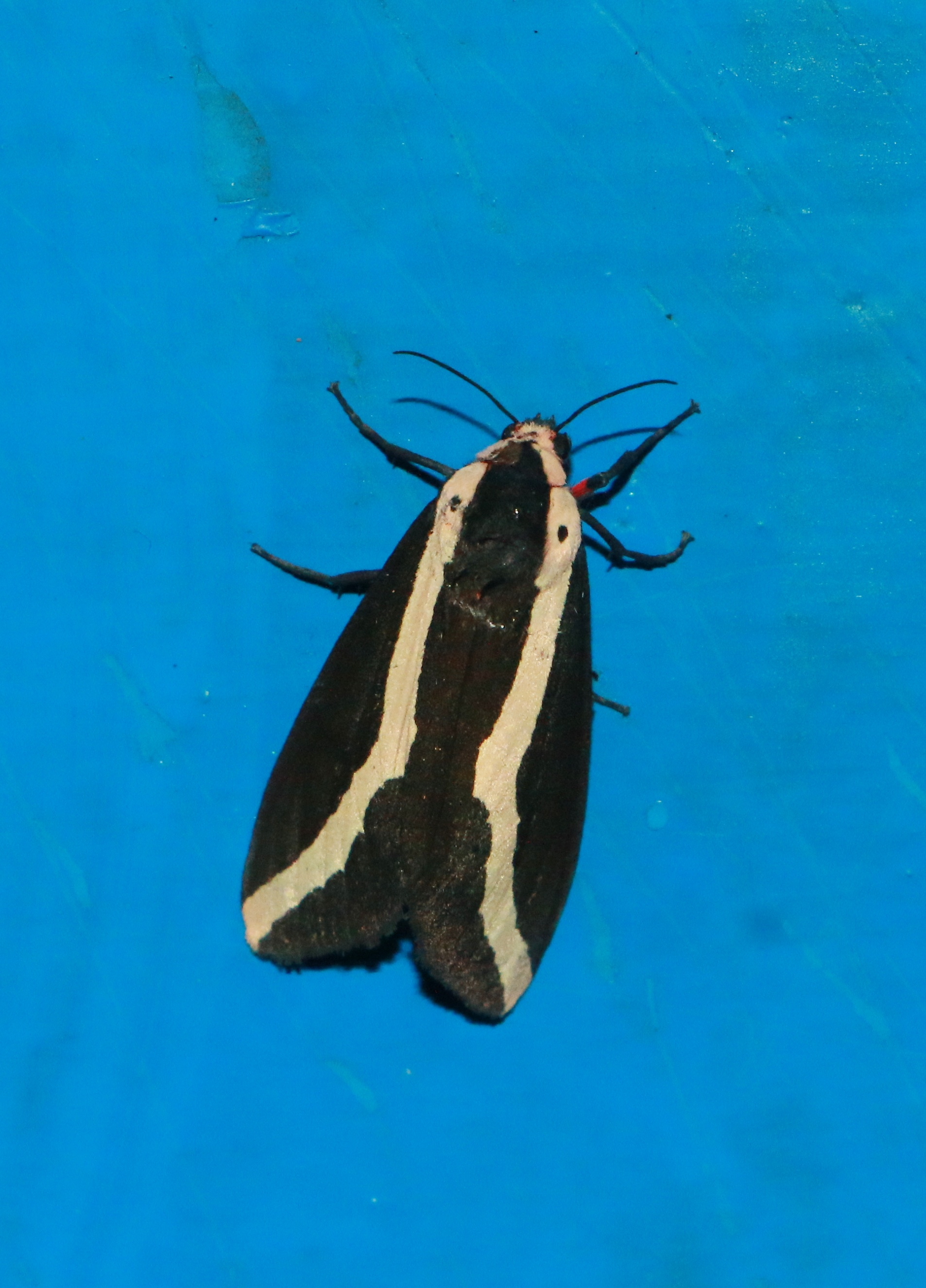
Rajendra species moth from koottanad Palakkad Kerala India

Rajendra is a genus of moths in the family Erebidae from India.

== Species ==
- Rajendra biguttata (Walker, 1855)
  - Rajendra biguttata irregularis Moore, 1882
- Rajendra cingulata (Rothschild, 1910)
- Rajendra perrottetii (Guérin-Méneville, [1844])
