= Argyarctia reikoae =

Scientific classification
- Kingdom: Animalia
- Phylum: Arthropoda
- Class: Insecta
- Order: Lepidoptera
- Superfamily: Noctuoidea
- Family: Erebidae
- Subfamily: Arctiinae
- Genus: Argyarctia
- Species: A. reikoae

Binomial name
- Argyarctia reikoae (Kishida, 1984)

Synonyms
- Spilosoma reikoae Kishida, 1984

Species of moth

Argyarctia reikoae is a moth of the family Erebidae. It was described by Yasunori Kishida in 1984. It is found in Taiwan.
