= Stictocompe confusa =

Scientific classification
- Kingdom: Animalia
- Phylum: Arthropoda
- Clade: Pancrustacea
- Class: Insecta
- Order: Lepidoptera
- Superfamily: Noctuoidea
- Family: Erebidae
- Subfamily: Arctiinae
- Genus: Stictocompe
- Species: S. confusa

Binomial name
- Stictocompe confusa (H. Druce, 1884)

Synonyms
- Arachnis confusa H. Druce, 1884; Hypercompe confusa (H. Druce, 1884)

Species of moth

Stictocompe confusa is a species of moth in the family Erebidae that was first described by Herbert Druce in 1884. It is found in Mexico.
