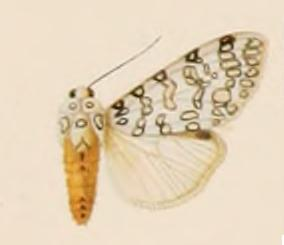

Scientific classification
- Kingdom: Animalia
- Phylum: Arthropoda
- Clade: Pancrustacea
- Class: Insecta
- Order: Lepidoptera
- Superfamily: Noctuoidea
- Family: Erebidae
- Subfamily: Arctiinae
- Genus: Stictocompe
- Species: S. oslari

Binomial name
- Stictocompe oslari (Rothschild, 1910)

Synonyms
- Ecpantheria oslari Rothschild, 1910; Hypercompe oslari (Rothschild, 1910)

= Stictocompe oslari =

Species of moth

Stictocompe oslari is a species of moth in the family Erebidae that was first described by Walter Rothschild in 1910. It is found from the extreme south of Texas, US south into Mexico.
