= Stictocompe albescens =

Scientific classification
- Kingdom: Animalia
- Phylum: Arthropoda
- Clade: Pancrustacea
- Class: Insecta
- Order: Lepidoptera
- Superfamily: Noctuoidea
- Family: Erebidae
- Subfamily: Arctiinae
- Genus: Stictocompe
- Species: S. albescens

Binomial name
- Stictocompe albescens (Hampson, 1901)

Synonyms
- Arachnis consfusa Druce, 1897; Arachnis albescens Hampson, 1901; Hypercompe albescens (Hampson, 1901)

Species of moth

Stictocompe albescens is a species of moth in the family Erebidae that was first described by George Hampson in 1901. It is found in Guatemala.

Larvae have been recorded feeding on Musa species.
