= Satara lorquinii =

Scientific classification
- Domain: Eukaryota
- Kingdom: Animalia
- Phylum: Arthropoda
- Class: Insecta
- Order: Lepidoptera
- Superfamily: Noctuoidea
- Family: Erebidae
- Subfamily: Arctiinae
- Genus: Satara
- Species: S. lorquinii

Binomial name
- Satara lorquinii (Felder, 1874)

Synonyms
- Arctioneura lorquinii Felder, 1874

Species of moth

Satara lorquinii is a moth in the family Erebidae. It was described by Felder in 1874. It is known from eastern Sulawesi in Indonesia.
