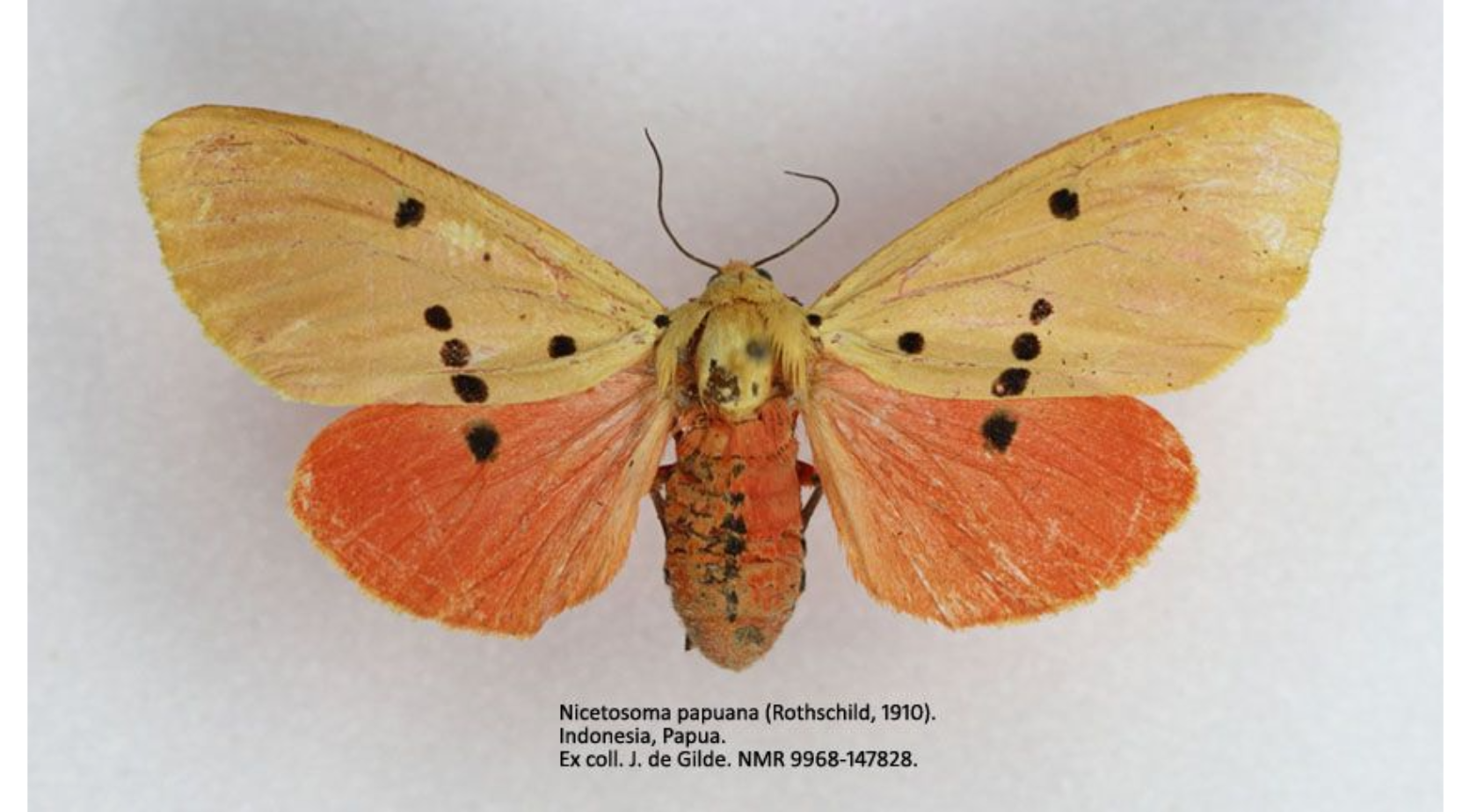

Scientific classification
- Kingdom: Animalia
- Phylum: Arthropoda
- Clade: Pancrustacea
- Class: Insecta
- Order: Lepidoptera
- Superfamily: Noctuoidea
- Family: Erebidae
- Subfamily: Arctiinae
- Genus: Nicetosoma
- Species: N. papuana

Binomial name
- Nicetosoma papuana (Rothschild, 1910)

Synonyms
- Diacrisia niceta papuana; Diacrisia niceta intermedia Rothschild, 1910; Diacrisia niceta mysolica Rothschild, 1915; Diacrisia niceta pallida Rothschild, 1916

= Nicetosoma papuana =

Species of moth

Nicetosoma papuana is a moth in the family Erebidae. It was described by Walter Rothschild in 1910. It is found in Papua New Guinea and on the Admiralty Islands.
