= Spilaethalida erythrastis =

Scientific classification
- Kingdom: Animalia
- Phylum: Arthropoda
- Class: Insecta
- Order: Lepidoptera
- Superfamily: Noctuoidea
- Family: Erebidae
- Subfamily: Arctiinae
- Genus: Spilaethalida
- Species: S. erythrastis

Binomial name
- Spilaethalida erythrastis (Meyrick, 1886)

Synonyms
- Spilosoma erythrastis Meyrick, 1886; Spilarctia erythrastis; Spilosomia frenchii Th.P. Lucas, 1898

Species of moth

Spilaethalida erythrastis is a moth belonging to the family Erebidae. It is found in north-eastern Australia (Queensland).
