= Caribarctia =

Scientific classification
- Kingdom: Animalia
- Phylum: Arthropoda
- Class: Insecta
- Order: Lepidoptera
- Superfamily: Noctuoidea
- Family: Erebidae
- Subfamily: Arctiinae
- Tribe: Arctiini
- Subtribe: Spilosomina
- Genus: Caribarctia; Ferguson, 1985

Genus of moths

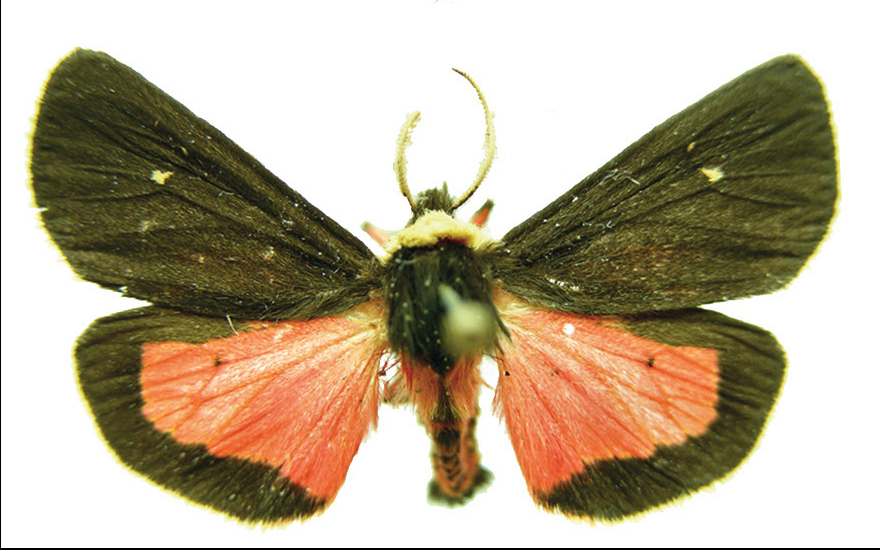
Caribarctia cardinalis

Caribarctia is a genus of moths in the subfamily Arctiinae first described by Douglas Campbell Ferguson in 1985. Both species are found in the Dominican Republic.

== Species ==
- Caribarctia cardinalis Ferguson, 1985
- Caribarctia bertrandae Vincent, 2006
