= Satara cornutiata =

Scientific classification
- Domain: Eukaryota
- Kingdom: Animalia
- Phylum: Arthropoda
- Class: Insecta
- Order: Lepidoptera
- Superfamily: Noctuoidea
- Family: Erebidae
- Subfamily: Arctiinae
- Genus: Satara
- Species: S. cornutiata

Binomial name
- Satara cornutiata Kirti & Gill, 2008

Species of moth

Satara cornutiata is a moth in the family Erebidae. It was described by Jagbir Singh Kirti and Navneet Singh Gill in 2008. It is known from Karnataka in southern India.
