= Paraspilarctia =

Scientific classification
- Domain: Eukaryota
- Kingdom: Animalia
- Phylum: Arthropoda
- Class: Insecta
- Order: Lepidoptera
- Superfamily: Noctuoidea
- Family: Erebidae
- Subfamily: Arctiinae
- Subtribe: Spilosomina
- Genus: Paraspilarctia; Kôda, 1988

Type species
- Diacrisia magna Wileman, 1910

Genus of moths

Paraspilarctia is a genus of moths in the family Erebidae. It occurs in China, Taiwan, and northern Vietnam.

== Species ==
=== Subgenus Paraspilarctia Kôda, 1988 ===
- Paraspilarctia magna (Wileman, 1910)

=== Subgenus Kishidarctia Dubatolov, 2003 ===
- Paraspilarctia klapperichi (Daniel, 1943)
