= Caribarctia cardinalis =

Scientific classification
- Kingdom: Animalia
- Phylum: Arthropoda
- Class: Insecta
- Order: Lepidoptera
- Superfamily: Noctuoidea
- Family: Erebidae
- Subfamily: Arctiinae
- Genus: Caribarctia
- Species: C. cardinalis

Binomial name
- Caribarctia cardinalis Ferguson, 1985

Species of moth

Caribarctia cardinalis is a moth in the subfamily Arctiinae first described by Douglas Campbell Ferguson in 1985. It can be found in the Dominican Republic.
