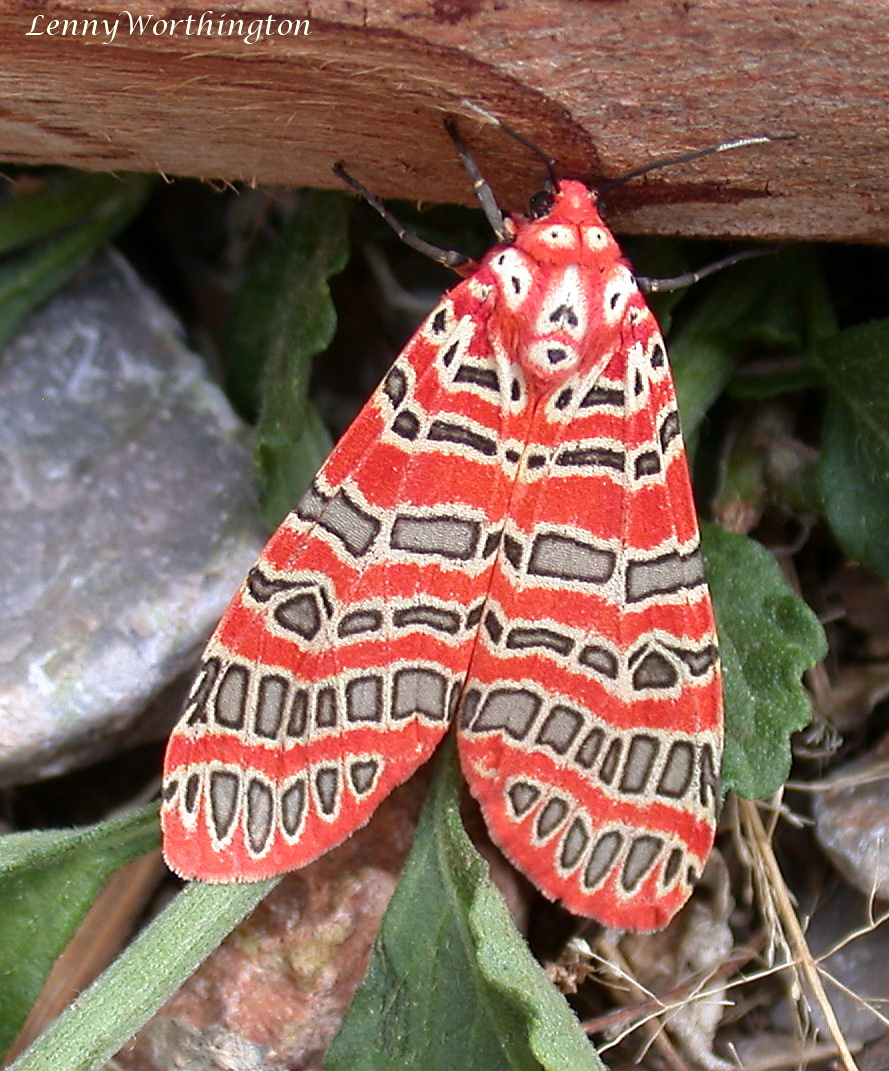
- The moth Tatargina Picta on a tree branch

Scientific classification
- Kingdom: Animalia
- Phylum: Arthropoda
- Class: Insecta
- Order: Lepidoptera
- Superfamily: Noctuoidea
- Family: Erebidae
- Subfamily: Arctiinae
- Genus: Tatargina
- Species: T. picta

Binomial name
- Tatargina picta (Walker, [1865])

Synonyms
- Deiopeia picta Walker, 1865; Tatargina picta Butler, 1877; Pericallia picta Hampson, 1901; Tatargina formosa Butler, 1877; Pericallia picta ab. lutea Rothschild, 1914; Pericallia picta lutea Fang, 2000

= Tatargina picta =

Species of moth

Tatargina picta is a moth in the family Erebidae. Francis Walker first described it in 1865. It is found in China (Hainan, Guangdong, Yunnan, Guangxi) and Taiwan.
