= Amsactoides guangxica =

Scientific classification
- Kingdom: Animalia
- Phylum: Arthropoda
- Clade: Pancrustacea
- Class: Insecta
- Order: Lepidoptera
- Superfamily: Noctuoidea
- Family: Erebidae
- Subfamily: Arctiinae
- Genus: Amsactoides
- Species: A. guangxica

Binomial name
- Amsactoides guangxica Dubatolov & Kishida, 2009

Synonyms
- Spilosoma solitaria C.L. Fang, 1982 (preoccupied Wileman, 1910); Amsactoides solitaria C.L. Fang, 1982

Species of moth

Amsactoides guangxica is a moth of the family Erebidae. It was described by Vladimir Viktorovitch Dubatolov and Yasunori Kishida in 2009. It is found in Guangxi, China.
