= Murzinarctia =

Scientific classification
- Kingdom: Animalia
- Phylum: Arthropoda
- Clade: Pancrustacea
- Class: Insecta
- Order: Lepidoptera
- Superfamily: Noctuoidea
- Family: Erebidae
- Subfamily: Arctiinae
- Subtribe: Spilosomina
- Genus: Murzinarctia; Dubatolov, 2005
- Species: M. murzini

Binomial name
- Murzinarctia murzini Dubatolov, 2005

Genus of moths

Murzinarctia is a monotypic moth genus in the subfamily Arctiinae. Its only species, Murzinarctia murzini, is known from the Chinese province of Yunnan. Both the genus and species were first described by Vladimir Viktorovitch Dubatolov in 2005.
