= Rajendra cingulata =

Scientific classification
- Domain: Eukaryota
- Kingdom: Animalia
- Phylum: Arthropoda
- Class: Insecta
- Order: Lepidoptera
- Superfamily: Noctuoidea
- Family: Erebidae
- Subfamily: Arctiinae
- Genus: Rajendra
- Species: R. cingulata

Binomial name
- Rajendra cingulata (Rothschild, 1910)

Synonyms
- Estigmene perrottetii cingulata Rothschild, 1910; Estigmene cingulata Rothschild, 1914; Estigmene biguttata var. cingulata Strand, 1919

Species of moth

Rajendra cingulata is a moth in the family Erebidae. It was described by Walter Rothschild in 1910. It is found in India.
