= Microcompe =

Scientific classification
- Kingdom: Animalia
- Phylum: Arthropoda
- Clade: Pancrustacea
- Class: Insecta
- Order: Lepidoptera
- Superfamily: Noctuoidea
- Family: Erebidae
- Subfamily: Arctiinae
- Subtribe: Spilosomina
- Genus: Microcompe; Laguerre, 2023

Type species
- Microcompe naumanni Laguerre, 2023

Genus of moths

Microcompe is a genus of tiger moths in the family Erebidae that was erected by French entomologist Michel Laguerre in 1883.

== Taxonomy ==
Two species are recognised in the genus Microcompe:

- Microcompe minasi Laguerre, 2023
- Microcompe naumanni Laguerre, 2023
