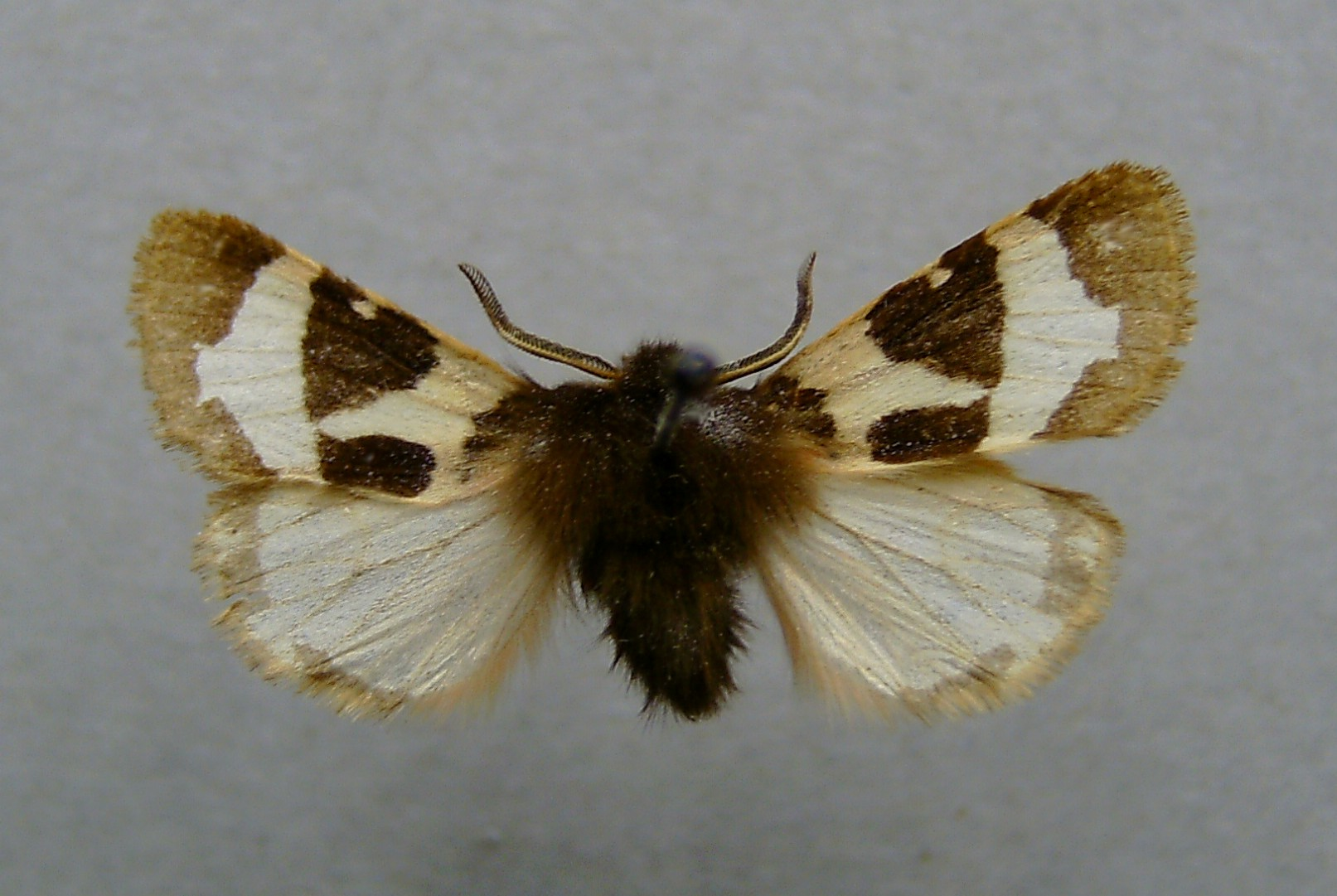

Scientific classification
- Kingdom: Animalia
- Phylum: Arthropoda
- Clade: Pancrustacea
- Class: Insecta
- Order: Lepidoptera
- Superfamily: Noctuoidea
- Family: Erebidae
- Subfamily: Arctiinae
- Subtribe: Spilosomina
- Genus: Watsonarctia de Freina & Witt, 1984
- Species: W. deserta

Binomial name
- Watsonarctia deserta (Bartel, 1902)

Synonyms
- Generic: Eucastana Leraut, 1985; Eurachia Dubatolov, 1985; Specific: Phalaena (Bombyx) casta Esper, 1784, preoccupied; Eucharia deserta; Arctia casta deserta Bartel, 1902; Phragmatobia esperi Koçak, 1980; Eucharia casta sibirica Koshantschikov, 1924; Watsonarctia callesi Gómez Bustillo, 1979

= Watsonarctia =

Genus and species of moth

Watsonarctia is a monotypic moth genus in the subfamily Arctiinae erected by Josef J. de Freina and Thomas Joseph Witt in 1984. Its only species, Watsonarctia deserta, the chaste pellicle, was first described by Max Bartel in 1902. It is found in central and south-eastern Europe, southern Russia, southern Siberia east to Lake Baikal; also in Asia Minor, Armenia, Azerbaijan, northern Iran, Kazakhstan, Kyrgyzstan and Xinjiang in China.

The wingspan is 26–32 mm.

The larvae feed on Asperula, Achillea and Galium species (including Galium verum and Galium odoratum).

== Subspecies ==
- Watsonarctia deserta deserta (Bartel, 1902) (southern and central Europe, Caucasus, north-western Kazakhstan, southern Siberia, northern Mongolia)
- Watsonarctia deserta karduchena (de Freina, 1983) (Anatolia)
- Watsonarctia deserta centralasiae (O. Bang-Haas, 1927) (mountains of eastern Kazakhstan, Xinjiang, eastern Tien Shan)
- Watsonarctia deserta elbursica Dubatolov & Zahiri, 2005 (northern Iran)
