= Satara aequata =

Scientific classification
- Kingdom: Animalia
- Phylum: Arthropoda
- Class: Insecta
- Order: Lepidoptera
- Superfamily: Noctuoidea
- Family: Erebidae
- Subfamily: Arctiinae
- Genus: Satara
- Species: S. aequata

Binomial name
- Satara aequata Walker, [1865]

Synonyms
- Pericallia aequata

Species of moth

Satara aequata is a species of moth in the family Erebidae first described by Francis Walker in 1865. It is found in western Sulawesi.
