= Murzinoria =

Scientific classification
- Kingdom: Animalia
- Phylum: Arthropoda
- Clade: Pancrustacea
- Class: Insecta
- Order: Lepidoptera
- Superfamily: Noctuoidea
- Family: Erebidae
- Subfamily: Arctiinae
- Subtribe: Spilosomina
- Genus: Murzinoria; Dubatolov, 2007
- Species: M. gracilis

Binomial name
- Murzinoria gracilis Dubatolov, 2007

Genus of moths

Murzinoria is a monotypic moth genus in the subfamily Arctiinae. Its only species, Murzinoria gracilis, is known from the Chinese province of Gansu. Both the genus and species were first described by Vladimir Viktorovitch Dubatolov in 2007.
