= Tatargina pannosa =

Scientific classification
- Domain: Eukaryota
- Kingdom: Animalia
- Phylum: Arthropoda
- Class: Insecta
- Order: Lepidoptera
- Superfamily: Noctuoidea
- Family: Erebidae
- Subfamily: Arctiinae
- Genus: Tatargina
- Species: T. pannosa

Binomial name
- Tatargina pannosa (Moore, 1879)

Synonyms
- Rajendra pannosa Moore, 1879; Alphaea pannosa; Pericallia pannosa; Nannoarctia pannosa

Species of moth

Tatargina pannosa is a moth in the family Erebidae. It was described by Frederic Moore in 1879. It is found in the north-western Himalayas and Nepal.
