= Chionarctia pura =

Scientific classification
- Domain: Eukaryota
- Kingdom: Animalia
- Phylum: Arthropoda
- Class: Insecta
- Order: Lepidoptera
- Superfamily: Noctuoidea
- Family: Erebidae
- Subfamily: Arctiinae
- Genus: Chionarctia
- Species: C. pura

Binomial name
- Chionarctia pura (Leech, 1899)

Synonyms
- Spilosoma pura Leech, 1899; Chionarctia purum (Leech, 1899)

Species of moth

Chionarctia pura is a moth of the family Erebidae. It was described by John Henry Leech in 1899. It is found in the Chinese provinces of Shaanxi, Sichuan, Guizhou and Yunnan.
