= Orhantarctia =

Scientific classification
- Kingdom: Animalia
- Phylum: Arthropoda
- Clade: Pancrustacea
- Class: Insecta
- Order: Lepidoptera
- Superfamily: Noctuoidea
- Family: Erebidae
- Subfamily: Arctiinae
- Subtribe: Spilosomina
- Genus: Orhantarctia; Dubatolov & Kishida, 2005

Type species
- Alphaea habibiei Orhant, 1999

Genus of moths

Orhantarctia is a genus of moths in the subfamily Arctiinae from Lesser Sundaland: Lombok and Flores. The genus was erected by Vladimir Viktorovitch Dubatolov and Yasunori Kishida in 2005.

== Species ==
- Orhantarctia cymbalophoroides (Rothschild, 1910)
- Orhantarctia habibiei (Orhant, 1999)
