= Argyarctia =

Scientific classification
- Kingdom: Animalia
- Phylum: Arthropoda
- Clade: Pancrustacea
- Class: Insecta
- Order: Lepidoptera
- Superfamily: Noctuoidea
- Family: Erebidae
- Subfamily: Arctiinae
- Subtribe: Spilosomina
- Genus: Argyarctia; Kôda, 1988

Type species
- Diacrisia fuscobasalis Matsumura, 1930

Genus of moths

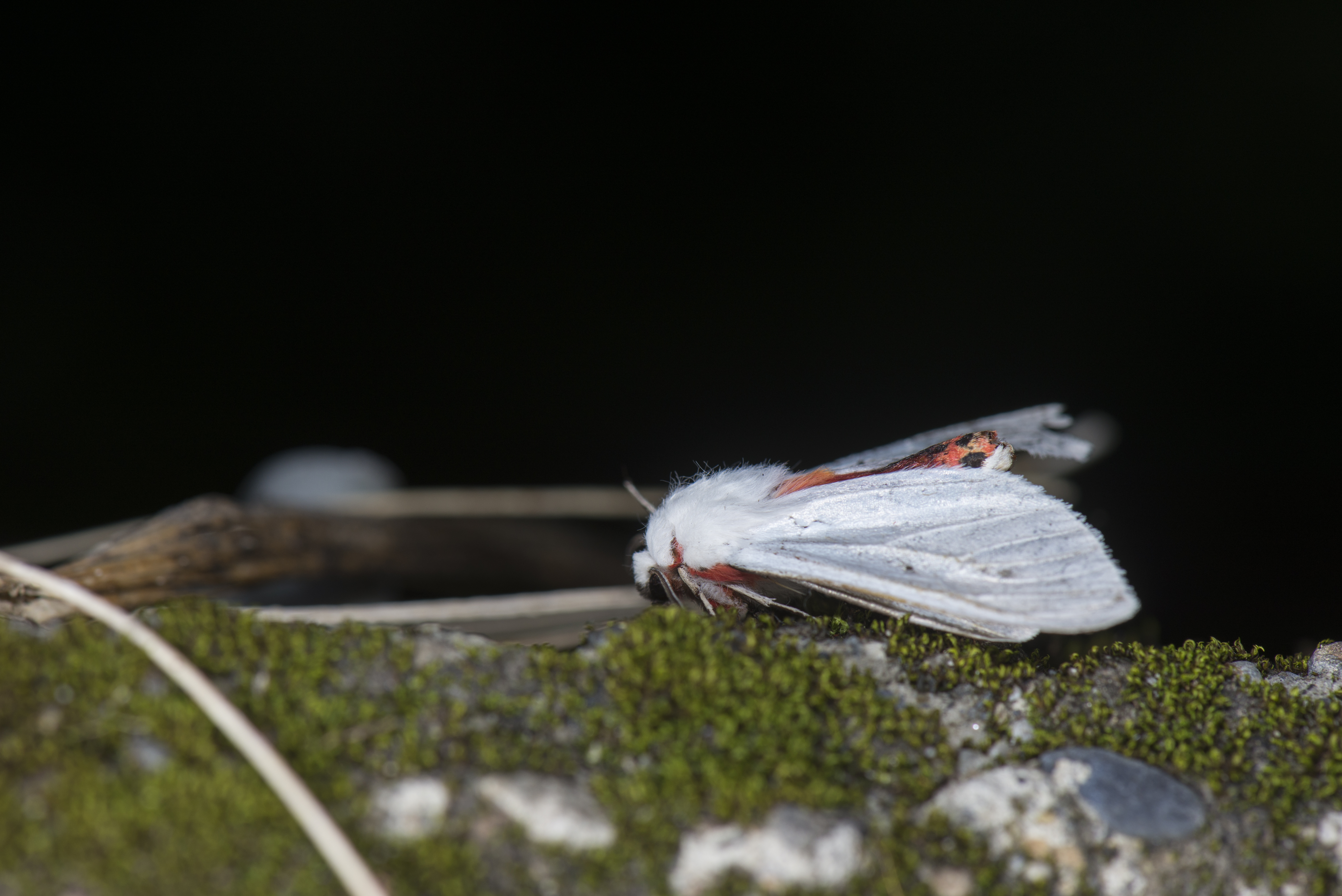
Argyarctia fuscobasalis

Argyarctia is a genus of tiger moths in the family Erebidae. The moths are found in Yunnan (China) and in Taiwan.

== Species ==
- Argyarctia fuscobasalis (Matsumura, 1930)
- Argyarctia reikoae (Kishida, 1984)

=== Subgenus Fangalphaea Dubatolov & Kishida, 2007 ===
- Argyarctia sericeipennis (Rothschild, 1933)
