= Heliozona lianga =

Scientific classification
- Domain: Eukaryota
- Kingdom: Animalia
- Phylum: Arthropoda
- Class: Insecta
- Order: Lepidoptera
- Superfamily: Noctuoidea
- Family: Erebidae
- Subfamily: Arctiinae
- Genus: Heliozona
- Species: H. lianga

Binomial name
- Heliozona lianga (Semper, 1899)

Synonyms
- Satara lianga Semper, 1899

Species of moth

Heliozona lianga is a moth of the family Erebidae first described by Georg Semper in 1899. It is found on Mindanao in the Philippines.
