= Sinowatsonia mussoti =

Scientific classification
- Domain: Eukaryota
- Kingdom: Animalia
- Phylum: Arthropoda
- Class: Insecta
- Order: Lepidoptera
- Superfamily: Noctuoidea
- Family: Erebidae
- Subfamily: Arctiinae
- Genus: Sinowatsonia
- Species: S. mussoti

Binomial name
- Sinowatsonia mussoti (Oberthür, 1903)

Synonyms
- Arctia mussoti Oberthür, 1903; Sinoarctia mussoti; Micrarctia batangi Daniel, 1943; Sinowatsonia batangi

Species of moth

Sinowatsonia mussoti is a moth in the family Erebidae. It was described by Charles Oberthür in 1903. It is found in Sichuan and Tibet in China.
