= Stictocompe cermelii =

Scientific classification
- Kingdom: Animalia
- Phylum: Arthropoda
- Clade: Pancrustacea
- Class: Insecta
- Order: Lepidoptera
- Superfamily: Noctuoidea
- Family: Erebidae
- Subfamily: Arctiinae
- Genus: Stictocompe
- Species: S. cermelii

Binomial name
- Stictocompe cermelii (Watson, 1977)

Synonyms
- Hypercompe cermelii Watson, 1977

Species of moth

Stictocompe cermelii is a species of moth in the subfamily Arctiinae that was first described by Allan Watson in 1977. It is found in Venezuela.

The larvae have been recorded feeding on Gossypium, Plantago and Solanum species.
