= Satara nympha =

Scientific classification
- Kingdom: Animalia
- Phylum: Arthropoda
- Clade: Pancrustacea
- Class: Insecta
- Order: Lepidoptera
- Superfamily: Noctuoidea
- Family: Erebidae
- Subfamily: Arctiinae
- Genus: Satara
- Species: S. nympha

Binomial name
- Satara nympha Dubatolov & Kishida, 2005

Species of moth

Satara nympha is a moth in the family Erebidae. It was described by Vladimir Viktorovitch Dubatolov and Yasunori Kishida in 2005. It is found in central Sulawesi.
