= Cymaroa =

Scientific classification
- Kingdom: Animalia
- Phylum: Arthropoda
- Class: Insecta
- Order: Lepidoptera
- Superfamily: Noctuoidea
- Family: Erebidae
- Subfamily: Arctiinae
- Tribe: Arctiini
- Subtribe: Spilosomina
- Genus: Cymaroa; Hampson, 1905
- Species: C. grisea

Binomial name
- Cymaroa grisea (Thunberg, 1784)

Synonyms
- Bombyx grisea Thunberg, 1784; Cymaroa leptopepla Hampson, 1905 (type species)

Genus of moths

Cymaroa is a monotypic of tiger moth genus in the family Erebidae erected by George Hampson in 1905. Its only species, Cymaroa grisea, was described by Carl Peter Thunberg in 1784. It is found in Lesotho, Namibia and South Africa.
