= Murzinowatsonia =

Scientific classification
- Kingdom: Animalia
- Phylum: Arthropoda
- Clade: Pancrustacea
- Class: Insecta
- Order: Lepidoptera
- Superfamily: Noctuoidea
- Family: Erebidae
- Subfamily: Arctiinae
- Subtribe: Spilosomina
- Genus: Murzinowatsonia; Dubatolov, 2003
- Species: M. x-album

Binomial name
- Murzinowatsonia x-album Oberthür, 1911

Synonyms
- Arctia x-album Oberthür, 1911

Genus of moths

Murzinowatsoniia is a monotypic moth genus in the subfamily Arctiinae erected by Vladimir Viktorovitch Dubatolov in 2003. Its only species, Murzinowatsonia x-album, was first described by Charles Oberthür in 1911. It is known from the Chinese provinces of Sichuan and Yunnan.
