= Madagascarctia =

Scientific classification
- Kingdom: Animalia
- Phylum: Arthropoda
- Clade: Pancrustacea
- Class: Insecta
- Order: Lepidoptera
- Superfamily: Noctuoidea
- Family: Erebidae
- Subfamily: Arctiinae
- Subtribe: Spilosomina
- Genus: Madagascarctia; Dubatolov, 2006

Type species
- Euchaetes madagascariensis Butler, 1882

Genus of moths

Madagascarctia is a genus of moths in the subfamily Arctiinae from Madagascar. The genus was erected by Vladimir Viktorovitch Dubatolov in 2006. As per David T. Goodger and Allan Watson (1995) the species of this genus have whitish wings speckled with brown.

== Species ==
- Madagascarctia adelinae (Toulgoët, 1991)
- Madagascarctia cellularis (Toulgoët, 1954)
- Madagascarctia feminina (Rothschild, 1933)
- Madagascarctia madagascariensis (Butler, 1882)
  - Madagascarctia madagascariensis sparsipuncta (Hampson, 1901)
