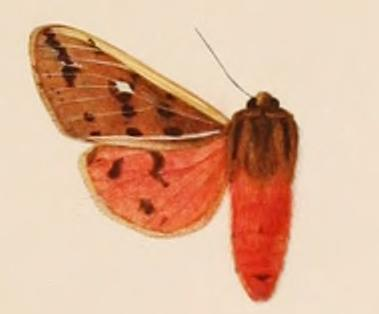
- Spilaethalida turbida

Scientific classification
- Kingdom: Animalia
- Phylum: Arthropoda
- Clade: Pancrustacea
- Class: Insecta
- Order: Lepidoptera
- Superfamily: Noctuoidea
- Family: Erebidae
- Subfamily: Arctiinae
- Subtribe: Spilosomina
- Genus: Spilaethalida; Dubatolov, de Vos et Daawia, 2007

Type species
- Spilarctia meeki Druce, 1899

= Spilaethalida =

Genus of moths

Spilaethalida is a genus of moths in the family Erebidae from New Guinea and Northern Australia. One undescribed species occurs in Sulawesi.

== Species ==
- Spilaethalida turbida (Butler, 1882)
- Spilaethalida erythrastis (Meyrick, 1886)
