= Phaos aglaophara =

Scientific classification
- Domain: Eukaryota
- Kingdom: Animalia
- Phylum: Arthropoda
- Class: Insecta
- Order: Lepidoptera
- Superfamily: Noctuoidea
- Family: Erebidae
- Subfamily: Arctiinae
- Genus: Phaos
- Species: P. aglaophara

Binomial name
- Phaos aglaophara Turner, 1926

Species of moth

Phaos aglaophara is a moth in the family Erebidae. It was described by Alfred Jefferis Turner in 1926. It is found on the Australian island state of Tasmania.
