= Tatargina =

Scientific classification
- Domain: Eukaryota
- Kingdom: Animalia
- Phylum: Arthropoda
- Class: Insecta
- Order: Lepidoptera
- Superfamily: Noctuoidea
- Family: Erebidae
- Subfamily: Arctiinae
- Subtribe: Spilosomina
- Genus: Tatargina; Butler, 1877

Type species
- Deiopeia picta Walker, [1865] 1864

Genus of moths

Tatargina is a genus of moths in the family Erebidae. The genus was erected by Arthur Gardiner Butler in 1877.

== Selected species ==
- Tatargina picta (Walker, [1865])

=== Subgenus Hindargina Dubatolov, 2006 ===
- Tatargina ceylonensis (Hampson, 1901)
- Tatargina pannosa (Moore, 1879)
- Tatargina sipahi (Moore, 1872)
