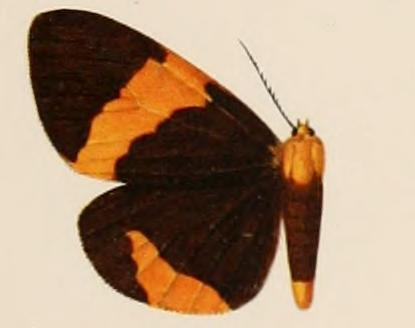

Scientific classification
- Kingdom: Animalia
- Phylum: Arthropoda
- Clade: Pancrustacea
- Class: Insecta
- Order: Lepidoptera
- Superfamily: Noctuoidea
- Family: Erebidae
- Subfamily: Arctiinae
- Genus: Heliozona
- Species: H. dulla

Binomial name
- Heliozona dulla (Pagenstecher, 1886)

Synonyms
- Agarista dulla Pagenstecher, 1886; Creatonotos dulla; Pericallia dulla; Aloa dulla; Pericallia dulla aurantiaca Rothschild, 1910; Pericallia dulla borealis Rothschild, 1910; Amsacta dulla orientalis Rothschild, 1914; Creatonotus affinis Rothschild, 1935

= Heliozona dulla =

Species of moth

Heliozona dulla is a moth of the family Erebidae first described by Arnold Pagenstecher in 1886. It is found on the Kai Islands and Papua New Guinea.
