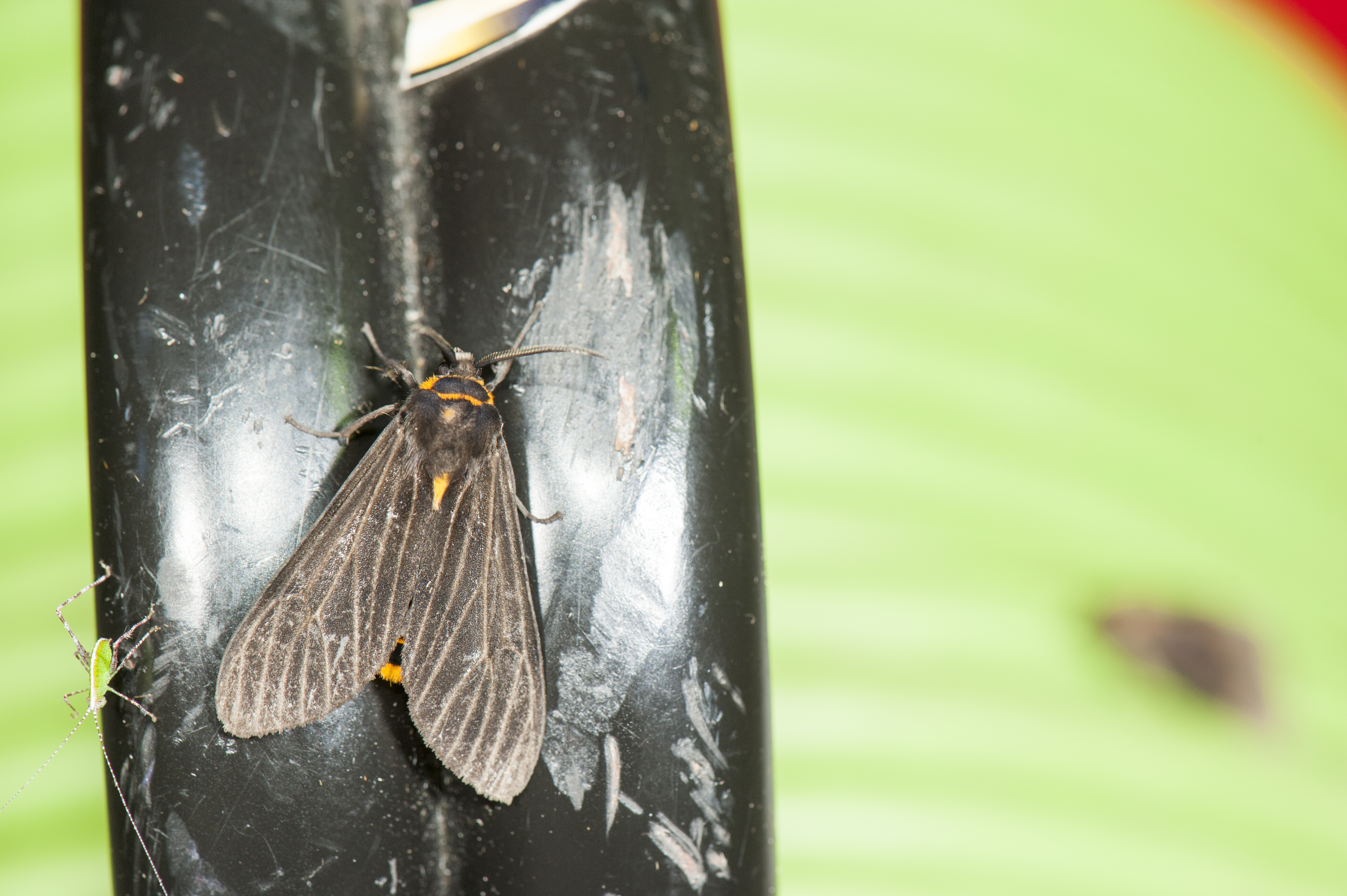

Scientific classification
- Domain: Eukaryota
- Kingdom: Animalia
- Phylum: Arthropoda
- Class: Insecta
- Order: Lepidoptera
- Superfamily: Noctuoidea
- Family: Erebidae
- Subfamily: Arctiinae
- Genus: Amsactoides
- Species: A. solitaria

Binomial name
- Amsactoides solitaria (Wileman, 1910)

Synonyms
- Diacrisia solitaria Wileman, 1910; Creatonotus formosae Strand, 1915

= Amsactoides solitaria =

Species of moth

Amsactoides solitaria is a moth of the family Erebidae. It was described by Alfred Ernest Wileman in 1910. It is found in Taiwan.
