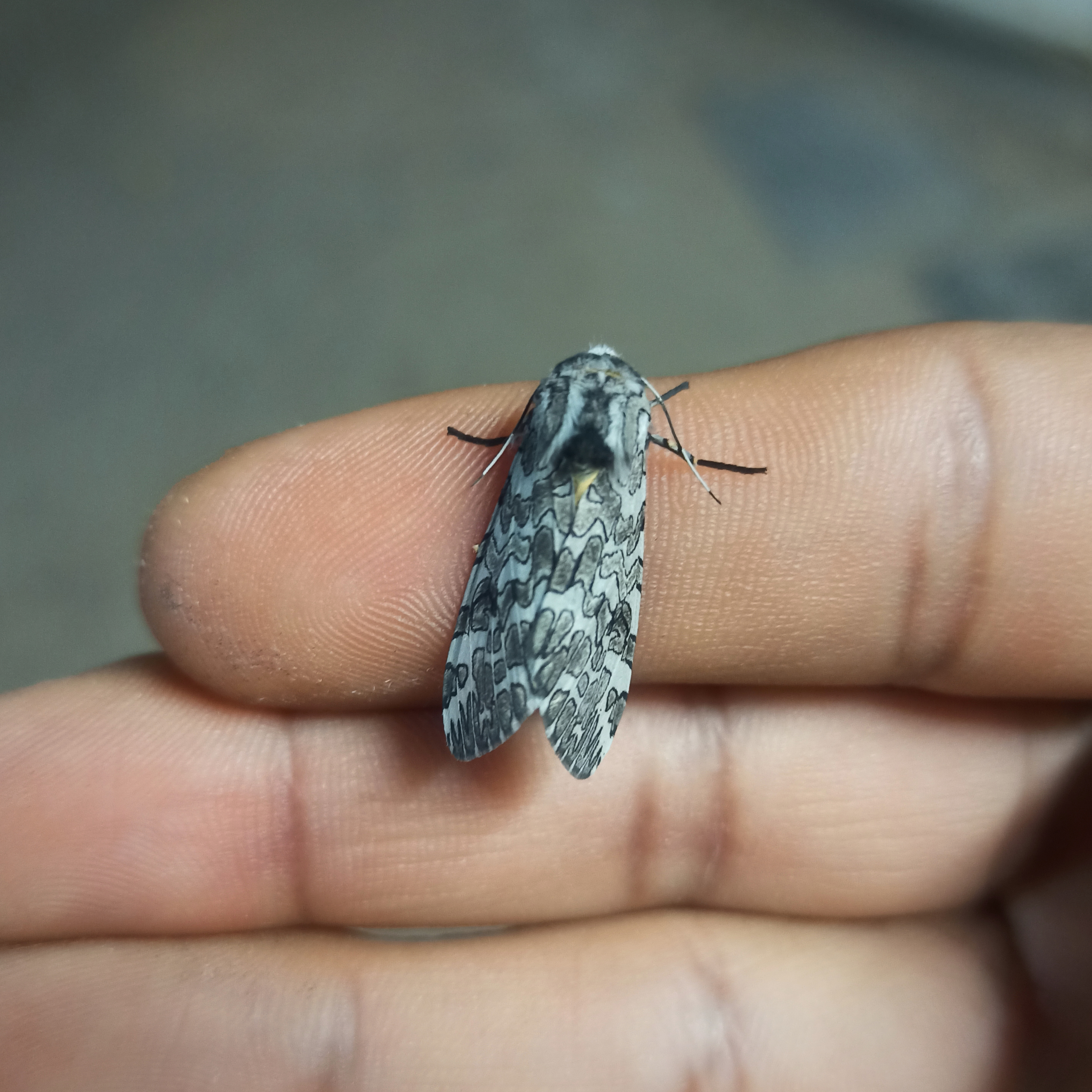

Scientific classification
- Kingdom: Animalia
- Phylum: Arthropoda
- Clade: Pancrustacea
- Class: Insecta
- Order: Lepidoptera
- Superfamily: Noctuoidea
- Family: Erebidae
- Subfamily: Arctiinae
- Genus: Stictocompe
- Species: S. suffusa

Binomial name
- Stictocompe suffusa (Schaus, 1889)

Synonyms
- Arachnis suffusa Schaus, 1889; Hypercompe suffusa (Schaus, 1889); Ecpantheria semiclara Stretch, 1906

= Stictocompe suffusa =

Species of moth

Stictocompe suffusa is a species of moth in the family Erebidae. It was first described by William Schaus in 1889. It is found in Mexico and the neighbouring south-western US (southern Arizona, and western Texas).

The wingspan is about 42 mm for males and 54 mm for females.

The larvae are polyphagous. The species overwinters in a loose cocoon. Pupation occurs in spring.
