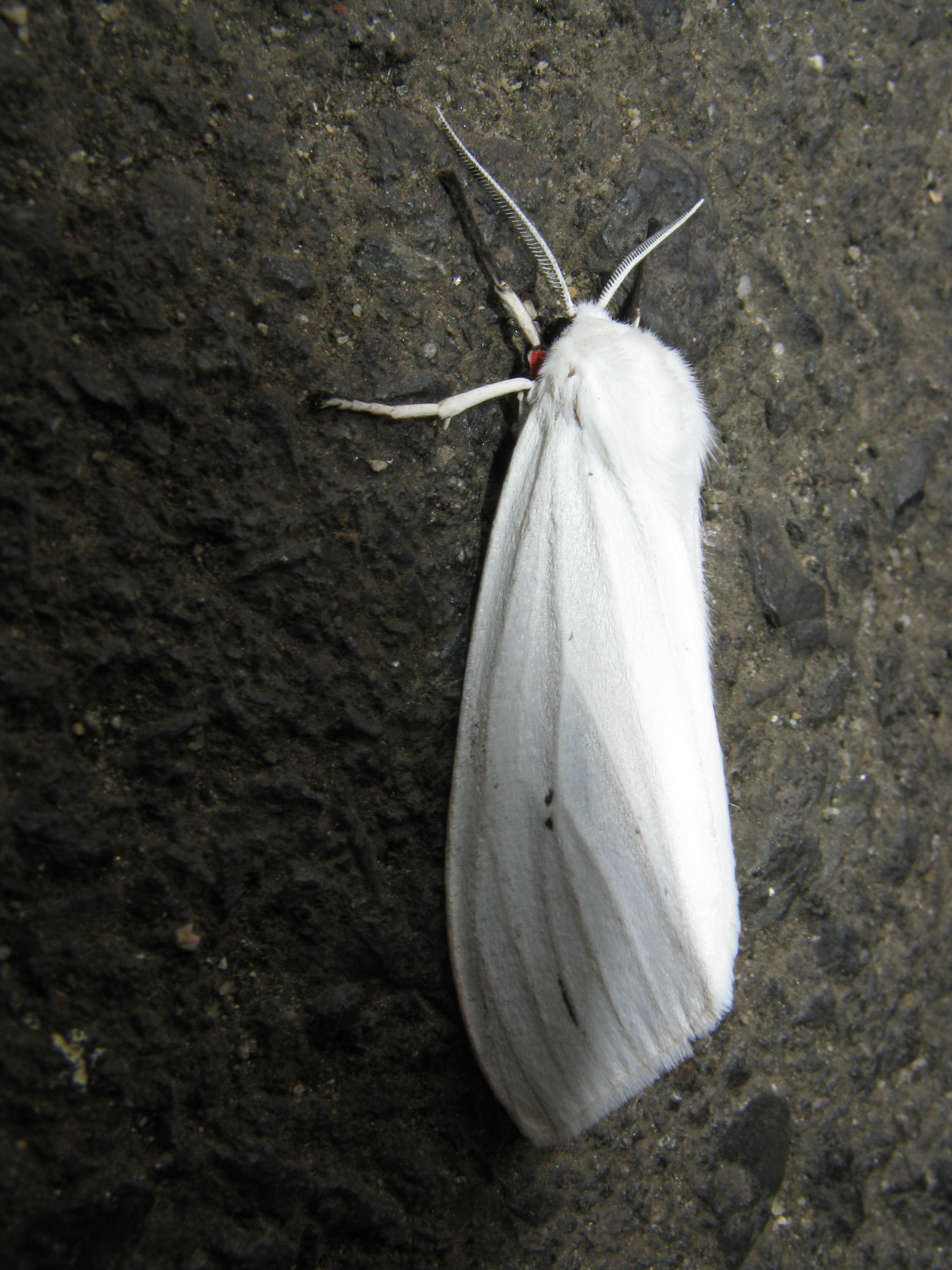
- Chionarctia nivea

Scientific classification
- Domain: Eukaryota
- Kingdom: Animalia
- Phylum: Arthropoda
- Class: Insecta
- Order: Lepidoptera
- Superfamily: Noctuoidea
- Family: Erebidae
- Subfamily: Arctiinae
- Subtribe: Spilosomina
- Genus: Chionarctia; Kôda, 1988

Type species
- Dionychopus nivea Ménétriès, 1859

Synonyms
- Gigantospilosoma Dubatolov, 1990

= Chionarctia =

Genus of moths

Chionarctia is a genus of tiger moths in the family Erebidae erected by Nobutoyo Kôda in 1859. The moths in the genus are found in east Asia.

== Species ==
- Chionarctia nivea (Ménétriés, 1859)
- Chionarctia pura (Leech, 1899)
