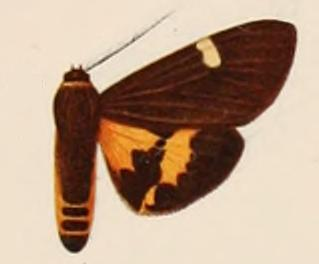

Scientific classification
- Domain: Eukaryota
- Kingdom: Animalia
- Phylum: Arthropoda
- Class: Insecta
- Order: Lepidoptera
- Superfamily: Noctuoidea
- Family: Erebidae
- Subfamily: Arctiinae
- Genus: Satara
- Species: S. everetti

Binomial name
- Satara everetti (Rothschild, 1910)

Synonyms
- Pericallia everetti Rothschild, 1910

= Satara everetti =

Species of moth

Satara everetti is a moth of the family Erebidae. It is found in southern Sulawesi.
