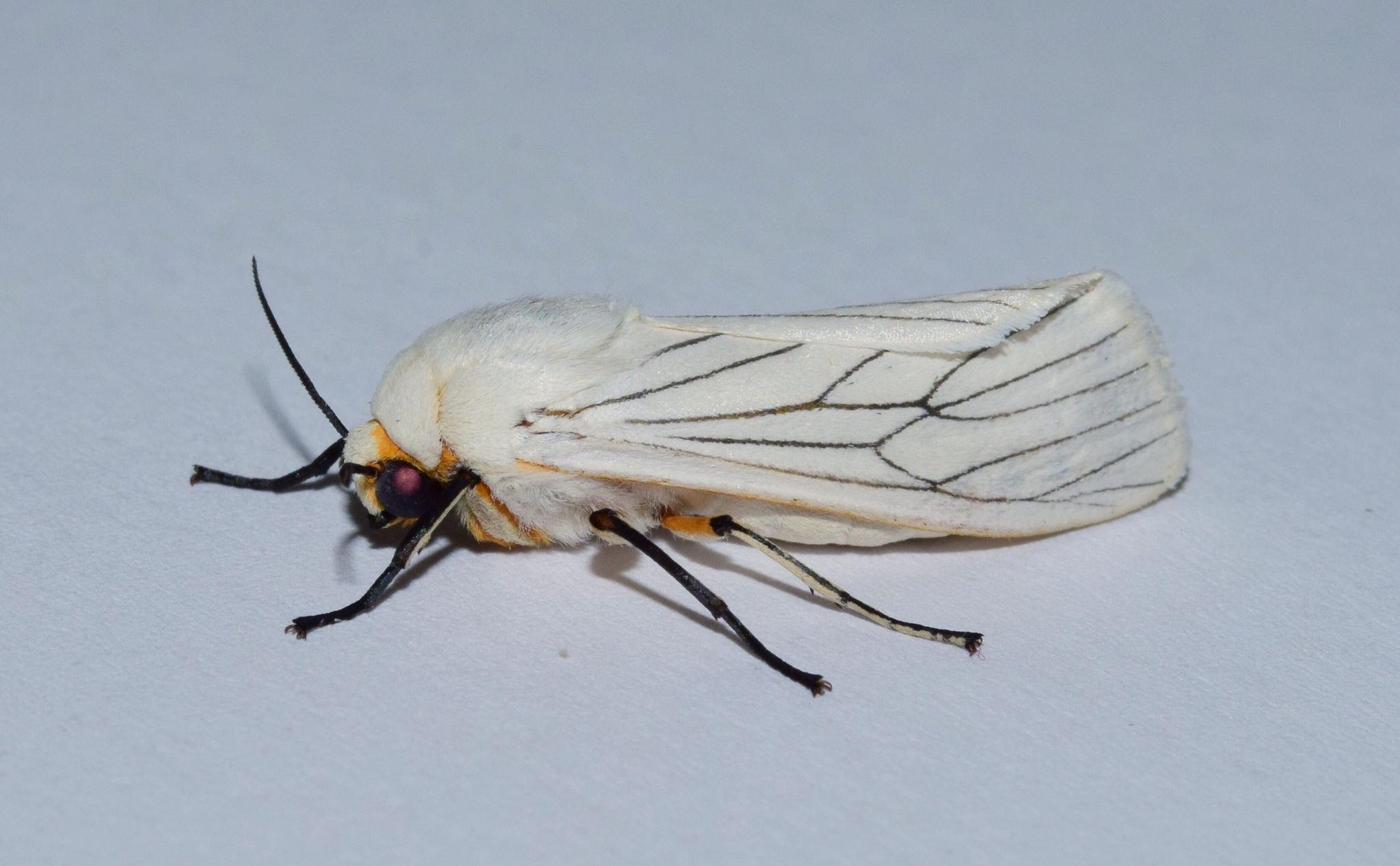
- Ustjuzhania lineata

Scientific classification
- Kingdom: Animalia
- Phylum: Arthropoda
- Clade: Pancrustacea
- Class: Insecta
- Order: Lepidoptera
- Superfamily: Noctuoidea
- Family: Erebidae
- Subfamily: Arctiinae
- Subtribe: Spilosomina
- Genus: Ustjuzhania; Dubatolov, 2009

Type species
- Spilosoma lineata Walker, 1855

= Ustjuzhania =

Genus of moths

Ustjuzhania is a genus of moths in the subfamily Arctiinae from southern and eastern Africa. The genus was erected by Vladimir Viktorovitch Dubatolov in 2009.

== Species ==
- Ustjuzhania chionea (Hampson, 1900)
- Ustjuzhania lineata (Walker, 1855)
  - Ustjuzhania lineata malawica Dubatolov, 2009
- Ustjuzhania albida (Bartel, 1903)
