= Detoulgoetia =

Scientific classification
- Kingdom: Animalia
- Phylum: Arthropoda
- Clade: Pancrustacea
- Class: Insecta
- Order: Lepidoptera
- Superfamily: Noctuoidea
- Family: Erebidae
- Subfamily: Arctiinae
- Subtribe: Spilosomina
- Genus: Detoulgoetia; Dubatolov, 2006

Type species
- Spilosoma aspersa Mabille, 1878

Genus of moths

Detoulgoetia is a genus of tiger moths in the family Erebidae. The genus was erected by Vladimir Viktorovitch Dubatolov in 2006. The moths are found in Madagascar and Comores. David T. Goodger and Allan Watson (1995) note that the species of this genus have white or yellowish wings speckled with brown dots without order and with dark discal spots.

== Species ==
- Detoulgoetia aspersa (Mabille, 1879) (now considered as a synonym of D. virginalis)
- Detoulgoetia comorensis Rothschild, 1933
- Detoulgoetia pseudosparsata Rothschild, 1933
- Detoulgoetia virginalis (Butler, 1878)
  - Detoulgoetia virginalis comorensis (Rothschild, 1933)
  - Detoulgoetia virginalis pseudosparsata (Rothschild, 1933)
  - Detoulgoetia virginalis pupieri (Toulgoët, 1991)
