= Stenucha =

Scientific classification
- Kingdom: Animalia
- Phylum: Arthropoda
- Class: Insecta
- Order: Lepidoptera
- Superfamily: Noctuoidea
- Family: Erebidae
- Subfamily: Arctiinae
- Tribe: Arctiini
- Subtribe: Spilosomina
- Genus: Stenucha; Hampson, 1901
- Species: S. dolens

Binomial name
- Stenucha dolens H. Druce, 1897

Synonyms
- Zamolis Dyar, 1910; Ardonipsa Dyar, 1912; Zamolis noctella Dyar, 1910; Ardonipsa melas Dyar, 1912

Genus of moths

Stenucha is a monotypic moth genus in the subfamily Arctiinae erected by George Hampson in 1901. Its only species, Stenucha dolens, was first described by Herbert Druce in 1897. It is found in Mexico.
