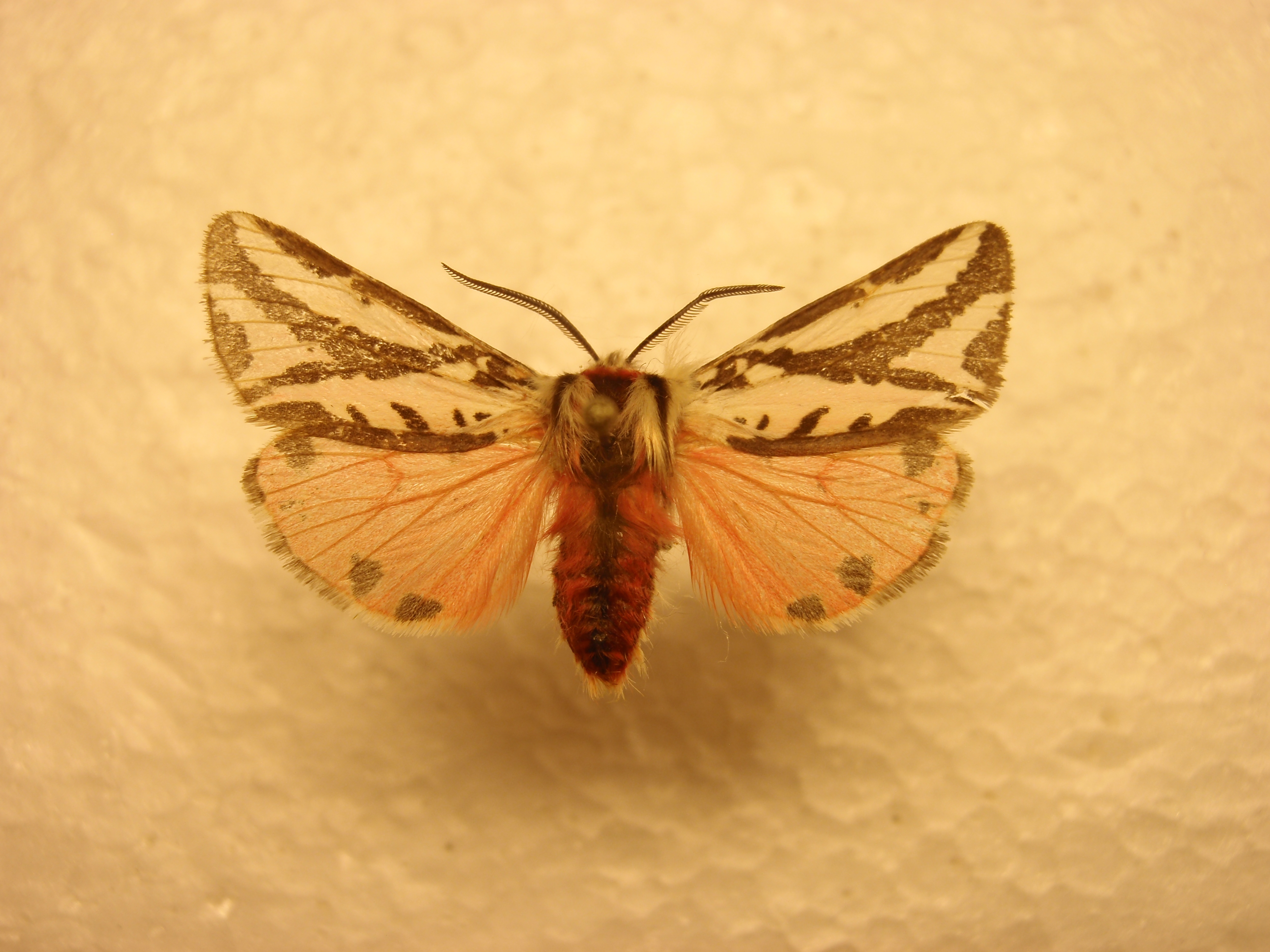

Scientific classification
- Domain: Eukaryota
- Kingdom: Animalia
- Phylum: Arthropoda
- Class: Insecta
- Order: Lepidoptera
- Superfamily: Noctuoidea
- Family: Erebidae
- Subfamily: Arctiinae
- Genus: Sinowatsonia
- Species: S. hoenei

Binomial name
- Sinowatsonia hoenei (Daniel, 1943)

Synonyms
- Micractia hoenei Daniel, 1943; Micrarctia hoenei alpicola Daniel, 1943

= Sinowatsonia hoenei =

Species of moth

Sinowatsonia hoenei is a moth in the family Erebidae. It was described by Franz Daniel in 1943. It is found in Yunnan and Tibet in China.

== Subspecies ==
- Sinowatsonia hoenei hoenei (China: Yunnan)
- Sinowatsonia hoenei alpicola (Daniel, 1943) (China: Yunnan, Tibet)
