= Phaos =

Scientific classification
- Kingdom: Animalia
- Phylum: Arthropoda
- Class: Insecta
- Order: Lepidoptera
- Superfamily: Noctuoidea
- Family: Erebidae
- Subfamily: Arctiinae
- Subtribe: Spilosomina
- Genus: Phaos; Walker, 1855

Type species
- Phaos interfixa Walker, 1855

Genus of moths

Phaos is a genus of moths in the family Erebidae from Australia. The genus was described by Francis Walker in 1855.

== Species ==
- Phaos aglaophara Turner, 1926
- Phaos interfixa Walker, 1855
