= Defreinarctia =

Scientific classification
- Kingdom: Animalia
- Phylum: Arthropoda
- Clade: Pancrustacea
- Class: Insecta
- Order: Lepidoptera
- Superfamily: Noctuoidea
- Family: Erebidae
- Subfamily: Arctiinae
- Subtribe: Spilosomina
- Genus: Defreinarctia; Dubatolov & Kishida, 2005

Type species
- Alphaea armini de Freina, 1999

Genus of moths

Defreinarctia is a genus of tiger moths in the family Erebidae. The genus was erected by Vladimir Viktorovitch Dubatolov and Yasunori Kishida in 2005. The moths in the genus are found in southeast Asia.

== Species ==
- Defreinarctia armini (de Freina, 1999)
- Defreinarctia dianxi (Fang et Cao, 1984)
