= Amsactoides =

Scientific classification
- Domain: Eukaryota
- Kingdom: Animalia
- Phylum: Arthropoda
- Class: Insecta
- Order: Lepidoptera
- Superfamily: Noctuoidea
- Family: Erebidae
- Subfamily: Arctiinae
- Subtribe: Spilosomina
- Genus: Amsactoides; Matsumura, 1927

Type species
- Creatonotus formosae Strand, 1915

Genus of moths

Amsactoides is genus of tiger moths in the family Erebidae. The genus was erected by Shōnen Matsumura in 1927.

== Species ==
The genus contains two species:

- Amsactoides guangxica Dubatolov & Kishida, 2009
- Amsactoides solitaria (Wileman, 1910)

Additional species may occur in Mainland Southeast Asia.
