= Poecilarctia =

Scientific classification
- Domain: Eukaryota
- Kingdom: Animalia
- Phylum: Arthropoda
- Class: Insecta
- Order: Lepidoptera
- Superfamily: Noctuoidea
- Family: Erebidae
- Subfamily: Arctiinae
- Subtribe: Spilosomina
- Genus: Poecilarctia; Aurivillius, 1921
- Species: P. venata

Binomial name
- Poecilarctia venata Aurivillius, 1921

Synonyms
- Spilosoma rubricosta

Genus of moths

Poecilarctia is a monotypic moth genus in the subfamily Arctiinae. Its only species, Poecilarctia venata, can be found in Zimbabwe and Malawi. Both the genus and species were first described by Per Olof Christopher Aurivillius in 1921.
