= Hollowaya =

Scientific classification
- Kingdom: Animalia
- Phylum: Arthropoda
- Clade: Pancrustacea
- Class: Insecta
- Order: Lepidoptera
- Superfamily: Noctuoidea
- Family: Erebidae
- Subfamily: Arctiinae
- Subtribe: Spilosomina
- Genus: Hollowaya; Dubatolov, 2010

Type species
- Spilosoma lateritica Holloway, 1979

Genus of moths

Hollowaya is a genus of tiger moths in the family Erebidae and is strictly endemic for New Caledonia.

== Species ==
- Hollowaya lateritica (Holloway, 1979)
- Hollowaya lifuensis (Rothschild, 1910)
