= Juxtarctia =

Scientific classification
- Domain: Eukaryota
- Kingdom: Animalia
- Phylum: Arthropoda
- Class: Insecta
- Order: Lepidoptera
- Superfamily: Noctuoidea
- Family: Erebidae
- Subfamily: Arctiinae
- Subtribe: Spilosomina
- Genus: Juxtarctia; Kirti & Kaleka, 2002

Type species
- Juxtarctia bispinuatus Kirti & Kaleka, 2002

Genus of moths

Juxtarctia is a genus of tiger moths in the family Erebidae. The genus is contains only two species, with Juxtarctia multiguttata being described by Francis Walker in 1855, which is endemic for the Himalayas, and Juxtarctia lizae from Laos.

== Species ==
- Juxtarctia multiguttata (Walker, 1855) (see junior synonym Juxtarctia bispinuatus Kirti & Kaleka, 2002)
- Juxtarctia lizae Černý, 2014
