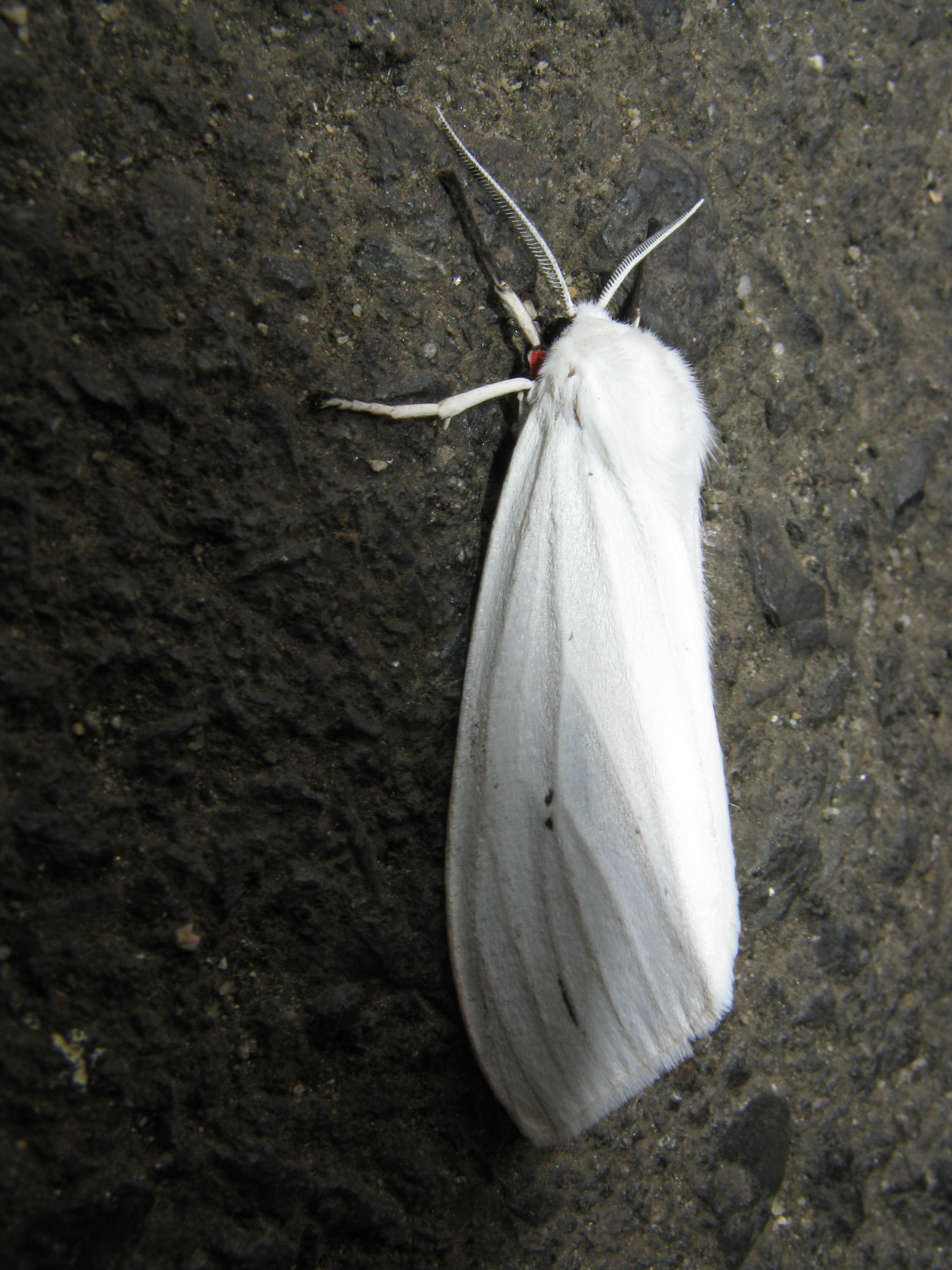

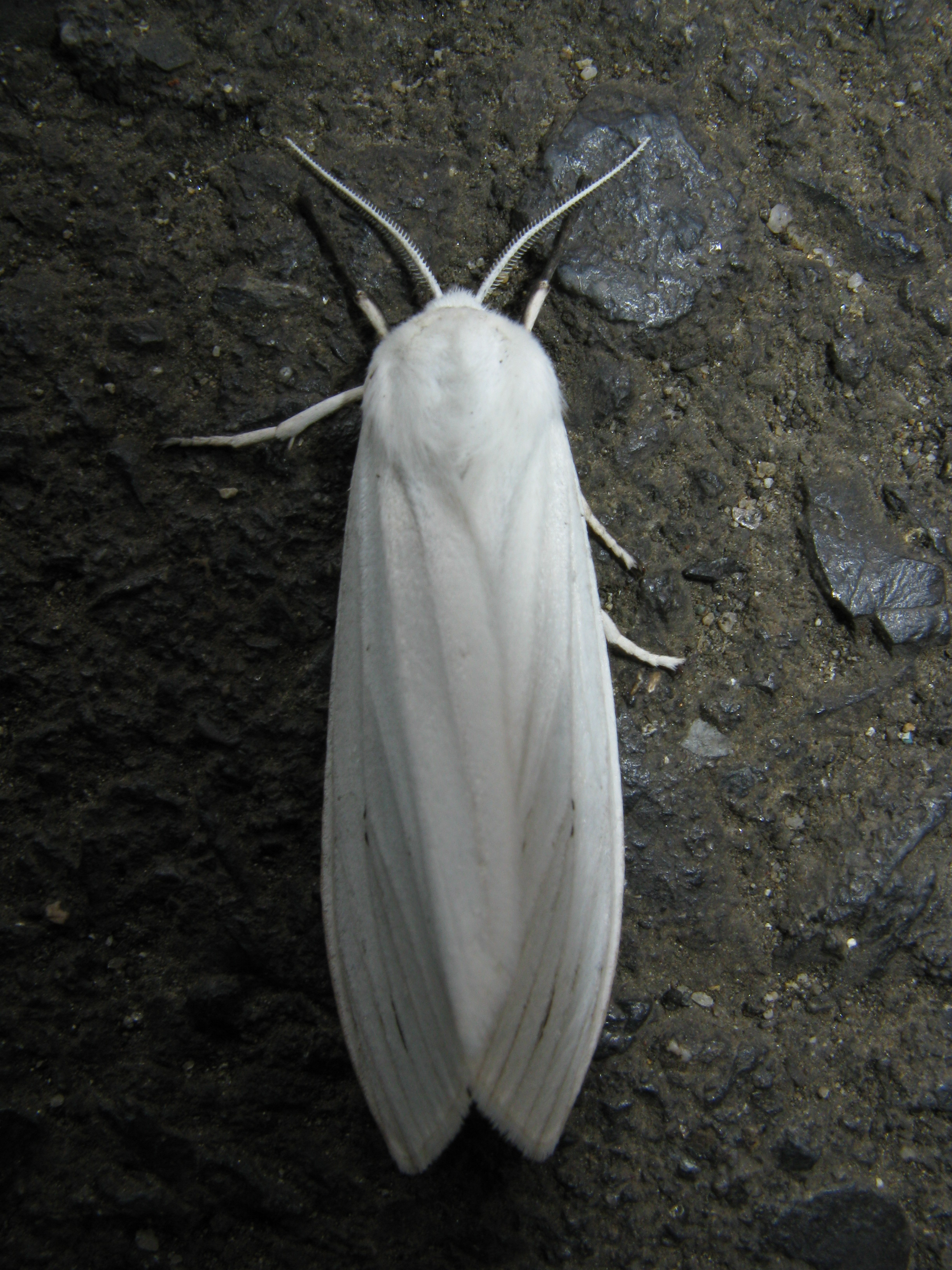

Scientific classification
- Domain: Eukaryota
- Kingdom: Animalia
- Phylum: Arthropoda
- Class: Insecta
- Order: Lepidoptera
- Superfamily: Noctuoidea
- Family: Erebidae
- Subfamily: Arctiinae
- Genus: Chionarctia
- Species: C. nivea

Binomial name
- Chionarctia nivea (Ménétriés, 1859)

Synonyms
- Dionychopus nivea Ménétriés, 1859; Dionychopus niveus; Chionarctia niveus

= Chionarctia nivea =

Species of moth

Chionarctia nivea is a moth of the family Erebidae. It was described by Édouard Ménétries in 1859. It is found in Russia (Middle Amur, Primorye, southern Sakhalin, Kunashir), China, Korea and Japan.
