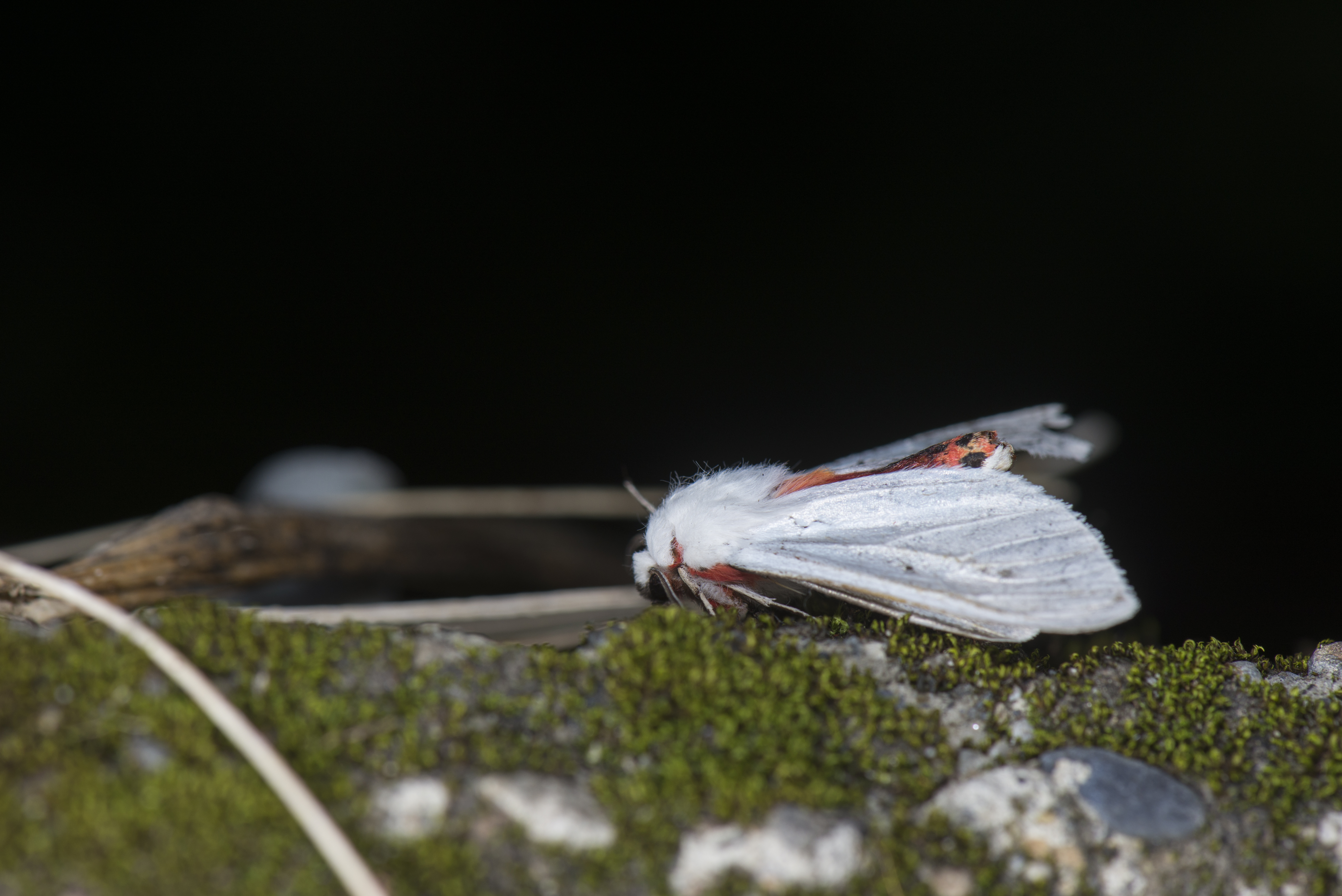

Scientific classification
- Kingdom: Animalia
- Phylum: Arthropoda
- Clade: Pancrustacea
- Class: Insecta
- Order: Lepidoptera
- Superfamily: Noctuoidea
- Family: Erebidae
- Subfamily: Arctiinae
- Genus: Argyarctia
- Species: A. fuscobasalis

Binomial name
- Argyarctia fuscobasalis (Matsumura, 1930)

Synonyms
- Diacrisia fuscobasalis Matsumura, 1930; Spilosoma fuscobasalis

= Argyarctia fuscobasalis =

Species of moth

Argyarctia fuscobasalis is a moth of the family Erebidae. It was described by Shōnen Matsumura in 1930. It is found in Taiwan.
