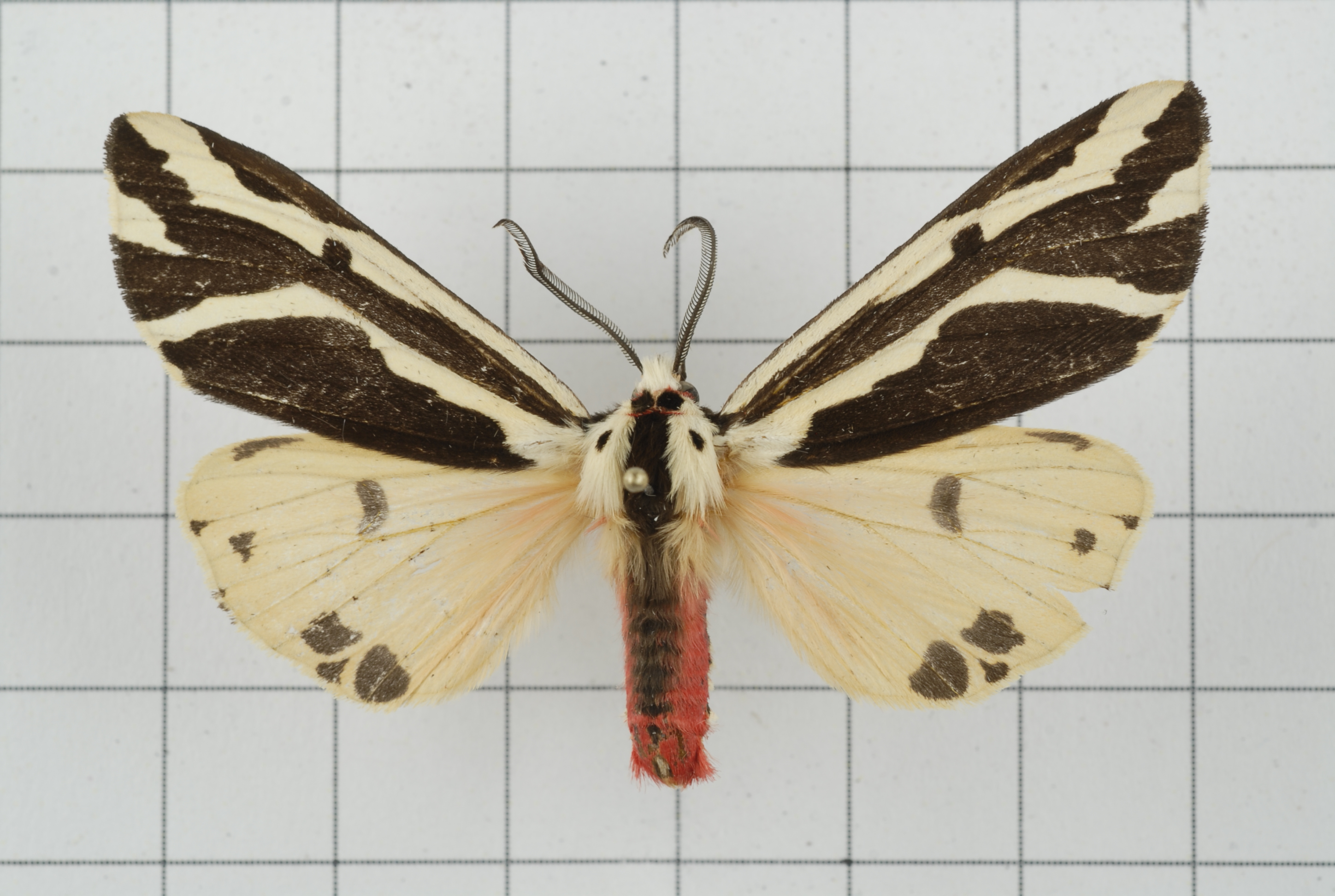
- Paraspilarctia Magna

Scientific classification
- Kingdom: Animalia
- Phylum: Arthropoda
- Class: Insecta
- Order: Lepidoptera
- Superfamily: Noctuoidea
- Family: Erebidae
- Subfamily: Arctiinae
- Genus: Paraspilarctia
- Species: P. magna

Binomial name
- Paraspilarctia magna (Wileman, 1910)

Synonyms
- Diacrisia magna Wileman, 1910

= Paraspilarctia magna =

Species of moth

Paraspilarctia magna is a moth of the family Erebidae. It was described by Alfred Ernest Wileman in 1910. It is found in Taiwan.
