= Argyarctia sericeipennis =

Scientific classification
- Kingdom: Animalia
- Phylum: Arthropoda
- Class: Insecta
- Order: Lepidoptera
- Superfamily: Noctuoidea
- Family: Erebidae
- Subfamily: Arctiinae
- Genus: Argyarctia
- Species: A. sericeipennis

Binomial name
- Argyarctia sericeipennis (Rothschild, 1933)

Synonyms
- Spilosoma sericeipennis Rothschild, 1933; Argyarctia flava Fang, 1994

Species of moth

Argyarctia sericeipennis is a moth of the family Erebidae. It was described by Rothschild in 1933. It is found in China (Yunnan).
