= Madagascarctia feminina =

Scientific classification
- Kingdom: Animalia
- Phylum: Arthropoda
- Clade: Pancrustacea
- Class: Insecta
- Order: Lepidoptera
- Superfamily: Noctuoidea
- Family: Erebidae
- Subfamily: Arctiinae
- Genus: Madagascarctia
- Species: M. feminina

Binomial name
- Madagascarctia feminina (Gaede, 1923)

Synonyms
- Spilosoma feminina Rothschild, 1933

Species of moth

Madagascarctia feminina is a moth of the Arctiinae family.

== Distribution ==
This moth is only known from Madagascar.
