= Seirarctia =

Scientific classification
- Kingdom: Animalia
- Phylum: Arthropoda
- Clade: Pancrustacea
- Class: Insecta
- Order: Lepidoptera
- Superfamily: Noctuoidea
- Family: Erebidae
- Subfamily: Arctiinae
- Subtribe: Spilosomina
- Genus: Seirarctia; Packard, 1864
- Species: S. echo

Binomial name
- Seirarctia echo (J. E. Smith, 1797)

Synonyms
- Phalaena echo Smith, 1797; Spilosoma niobe Strecker, 1885

Genus of moths

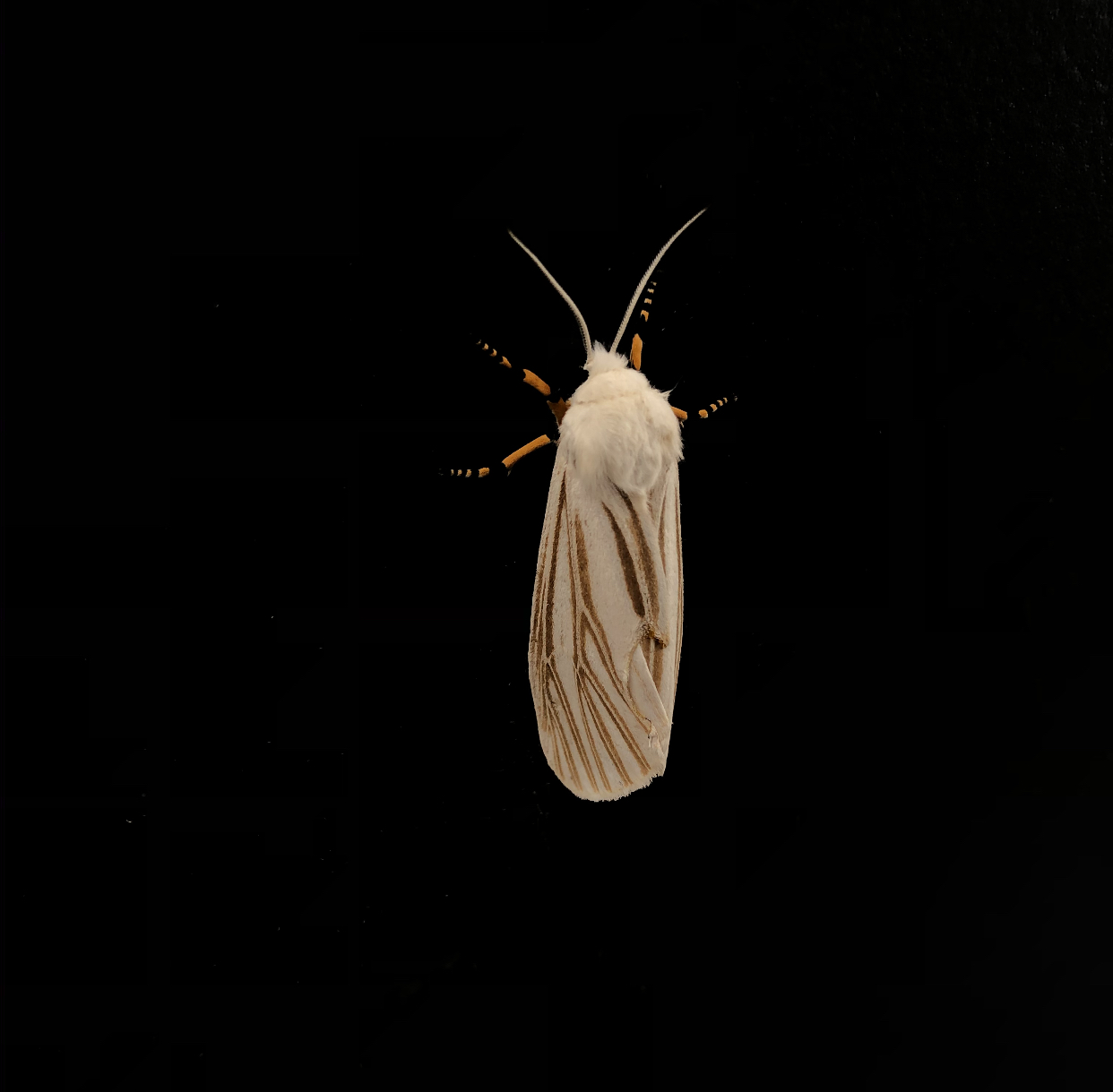
The Seirarctia echo Moth on the Carlton Union Building at Stetson University's DeLand, FL campus.

Seirarctia is a monotypic moth genus in the subfamily Arctiinae erected by Alpheus Spring Packard in 1864. Its single species, Seirarctia echo, the echo moth, was first described by James Edward Smith in 1797. It is found in North America, where it has been recorded from Georgia, Florida, Alabama and Mississippi. The habitat consists of thickets, scrubwoods and open areas.

The wingspan is about 45 mm.

The larvae feed on various woody plants, including coontie, cabbage palmetto, crotons, lupine, oak and persimmon.

== Caterpillars ==
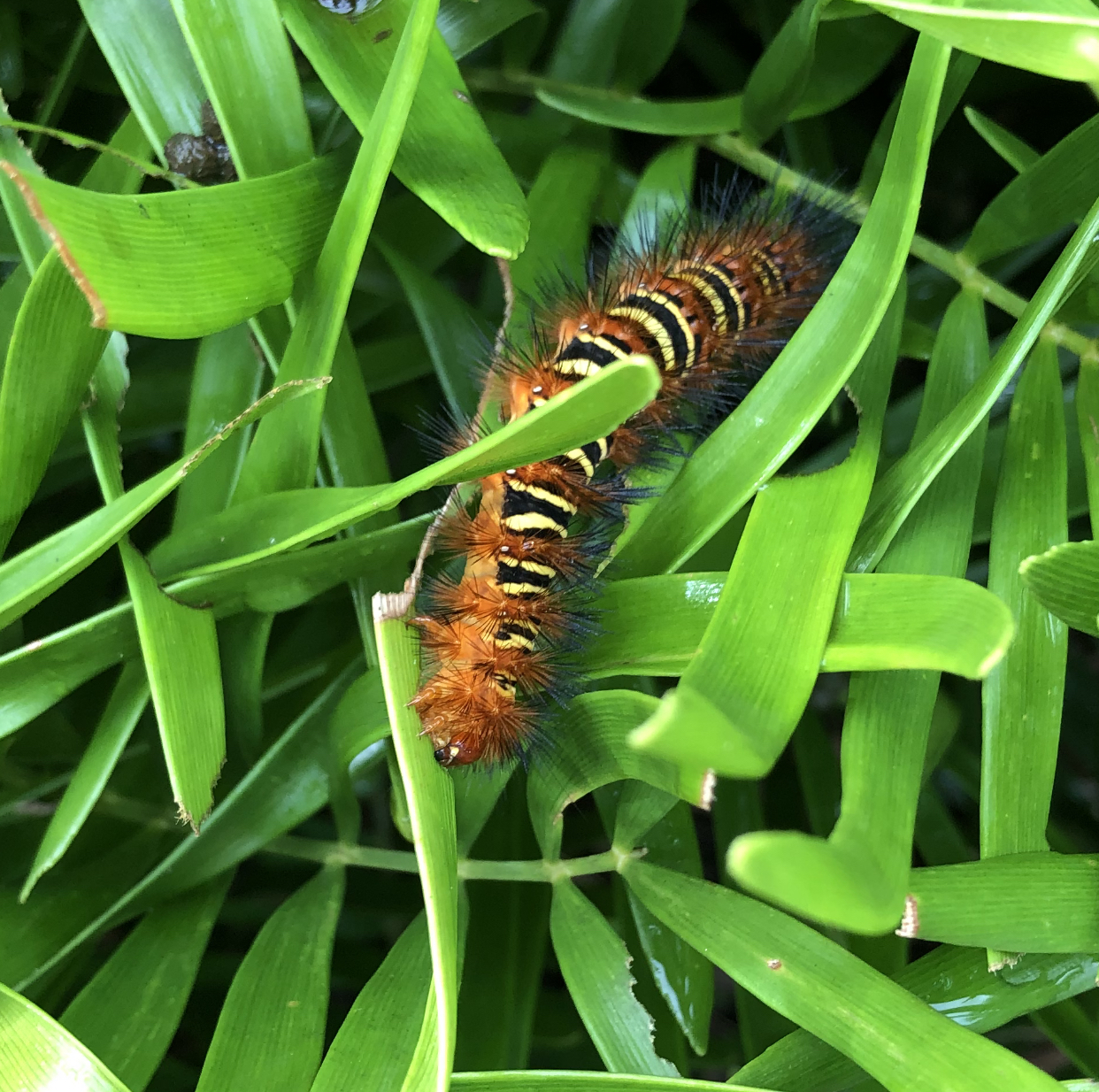
The caterpillar form of Seirarctia echo, eating coontie leaves at Stetson University's DeLand, FL campus.

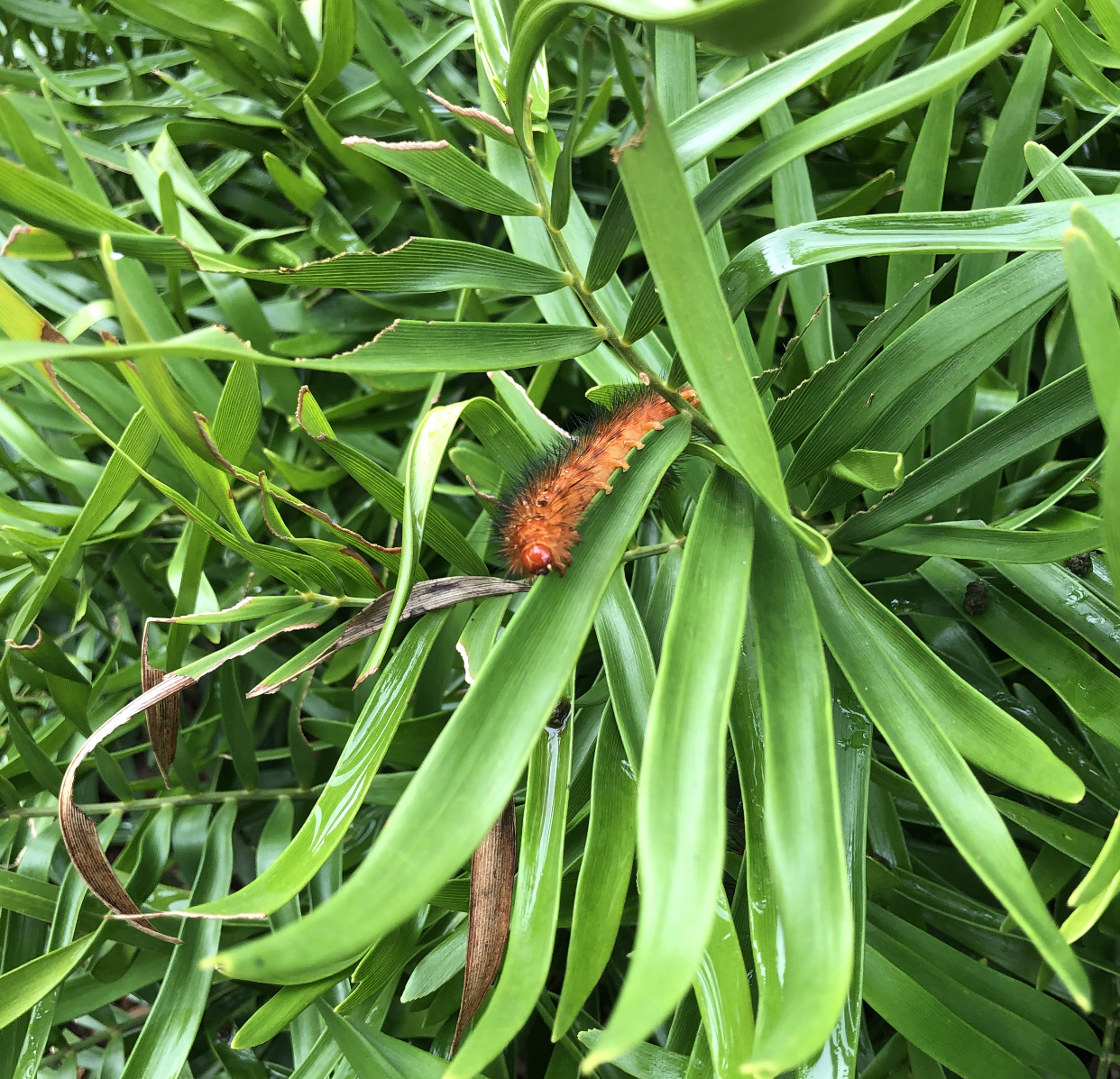
A Seirarctia echo caterpillar eating shrubbery

At Stetson University's DeLand, FL campus, many of the Seirarctia echo can be seen in their caterpillar stage. Colloquially referred to as "Hatterpillars" (a reference to the school mascot), these caterpillars are well known by students due to their frequent sightings in the summer, fall, and late spring. Although less frequent, the moths are also occasionally spotted.
