= Sinowatsonia =

Scientific classification
- Kingdom: Animalia
- Phylum: Arthropoda
- Clade: Pancrustacea
- Class: Insecta
- Order: Lepidoptera
- Superfamily: Noctuoidea
- Family: Erebidae
- Subfamily: Arctiinae
- Subtribe: Spilosomina
- Genus: Sinowatsonia; Dubatolov, 1996

Type species
- Micrarctia batangi Daniel, 1943

Genus of moths

Sinowatsonia is a genus of moths in the family Erebidae from mountains of West China.

== Species ==
- Sinowatsonia hoenei (Daniel, 1943)
  - Sinowatsonia hoenei alpicola (Daniel, 1943)
- Sinowatsonia mussoti (Oberthür, 1903)
