= Nicetosoma =

Scientific classification
- Kingdom: Animalia
- Phylum: Arthropoda
- Class: Insecta
- Order: Lepidoptera
- Superfamily: Noctuoidea
- Family: Erebidae
- Subfamily: Arctiinae
- Subtribe: Spilosomina
- Genus: Nicetosoma de Vos, 2011

Type species
- Phalaena Bombyx niceta Stoll, 1782

Genus of moths

Nicetosoma is a genus of moths in the subfamily Arctiinae from eastern Sundaland, from Sulawesi to New Guinea.

== Species ==
- Nicetosoma eogena (Walker, [1865])
- Nycetosoma hyporhoda (Butler, 1882)
- Nicetosoma inexpectata (Rothschild, 1933)
- Nicetosoma meforensis de Vos, 2011
- Nicetosoma niceta (Stoll, 1782)
- Nicetosoma papuana (Rothschild, 1910)
- Nicetosoma saturata (Rothschild, 1910)
- Nicetosoma sulphurata de Vos, 2011
- Nicetosoma semirosea (Butler, 1887)1
