= Eudiaphora =

Scientific classification
- Kingdom: Animalia
- Phylum: Arthropoda
- Clade: Pancrustacea
- Class: Insecta
- Order: Lepidoptera
- Superfamily: Noctuoidea
- Family: Erebidae
- Subfamily: Arctiinae
- Genus: Eudiaphora; Dubatolov, 1990
- Species: E. turensis

Binomial name
- Eudiaphora turensis (Erschoff, 1874)

Synonyms
- Spilosoma turensis Erschoff, 1874; Diaphora turensis maracandica Seitz, 1910; Diaphora afghanistanensis Daniel, 1966

Genus of moths

Eudiaphora is a monotypic genus of tiger moths in the family Erebidae erected by Vladimir Viktorovitch Dubatolov in 1990. Its only species, Eudiaphora turensis, was first described by Nikolay Grigoryevich Erschoff in 1874. It is found in the mountains and deserts of Turkmenistan, Kazakhstan, Kyrgyzstan, Uzbekistan, Tajikistan, Afghanistan, western Mongolia, and China (Xinjiang).

== Species and subspecies ==
- Eudiaphora turensis (Erschoff, 1874)
  - Eudiaphora turensis kopetdaghica Dubatolov, 2004
  - Eudiaphora turensis kuhitangica Dubatolov, 2004
