= Alexicles =

Scientific classification
- Kingdom: Animalia
- Phylum: Arthropoda
- Class: Insecta
- Order: Lepidoptera
- Superfamily: Noctuoidea
- Family: Erebidae
- Subfamily: Arctiinae
- Genus: Alexicles; Grote, 1883
- Species: A. aspersa

Binomial name
- Alexicles aspersa Grote, 1883

Genus of moths

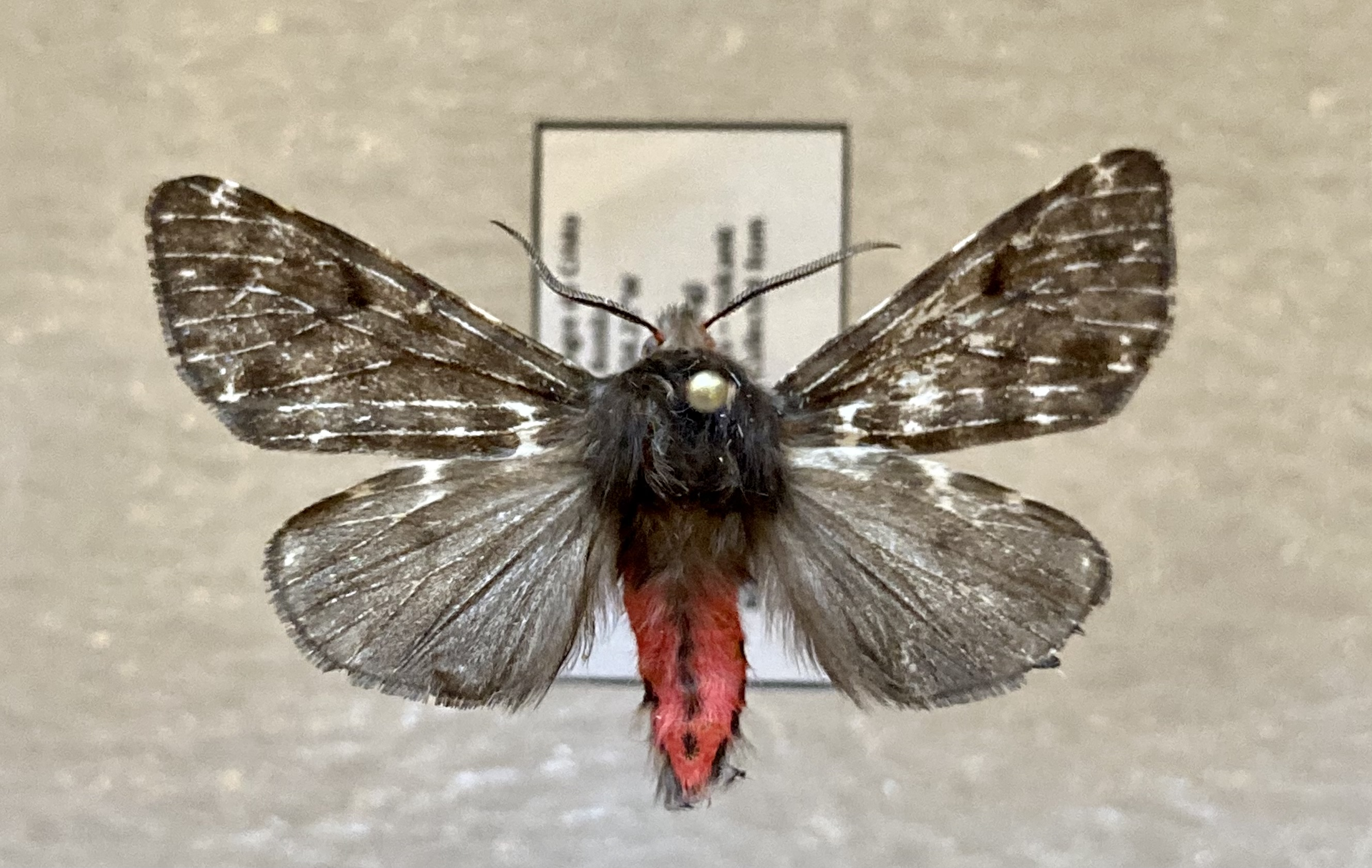
Alexicles aspersa. Collected on July 3, 2016 in Mora County, New Mexico from an ultraviolet light trap. Elevation 2560 - 2565 meters in Volcanic Mid-Elevation Forest.

Alexicles is a monotypic genus of tiger moth genus in the family Erebidae. Its only species, Alexicles aspersa, the Alexicles moth, is found in the US states of New Mexico and Arizona. Both the genus and species were first described by Augustus Radcliffe Grote in 1883.

The wingspan is about 25 mm. Adults are on wing in June and July.
