= Rajendra biguttata =

Scientific classification
- Kingdom: Animalia
- Phylum: Arthropoda
- Class: Insecta
- Order: Lepidoptera
- Superfamily: Noctuoidea
- Family: Erebidae
- Subfamily: Arctiinae
- Genus: Rajendra
- Species: R. biguttata

Binomial name
- Rajendra biguttata (Walker, 1855)

Synonyms
- Aloa biguttata Walker, 1855; Alphaea biguttata; Estigmene biguttata; Aloa nigricans Moore, 1872; Rajendra nigricans; Alphaea nigricans; Estigmene nigricans; Rajendra lativitta Moore, 1879; Estigmene perrottetii Hampson, 1901; Rajendra irregularis Moore, 1882; Alphaea irregularis; Estigmene irregularis

Species of moth

Rajendra biguttata is a moth in the family Erebidae. It was described by Francis Walker in 1855. It is found from southern India to north-eastern India and in Bangladesh and Sri Lanka.

== Description ==
Head and thorax are black. Vertex of the head with a white band. Abdomen crimson dorsally and black ventrally with a series of short dorsal black bands. The species has white fascia on the forewing which is broader and elbowed at vein 2 which runs from base to the apex. Hindwings crimson with black cilia. In Sri Lankan subspecies, cilia are whitish.

== Subspecies ==
- Rajendra biguttata biguttata
- Rajendra biguttata irregularis (Moore, 1882) (Sri Lanka)
