= Streltzovia =

Scientific classification
- Kingdom: Animalia
- Phylum: Arthropoda
- Clade: Pancrustacea
- Class: Insecta
- Order: Lepidoptera
- Superfamily: Noctuoidea
- Family: Erebidae
- Subfamily: Arctiinae
- Tribe: Arctiini
- Genus: Streltzovia; Dubatolov et Wu, 2008
- Species: S. caeria

Binomial name
- Streltzovia caeria (Püngeler, 1906)

Synonyms
- Diacrisia (Spilosoma) caeria Püngeler, 1906; Spilosoma caeria; Spilosoma mienshanica Daniel, 1943; Spilosoma mienshanicum; Spilosoma streltzovi Dubatolov, 1996

Genus of moths

Streltzovia is a genus of moths in the subfamily Arctiinae from East Asia. By general appearance, it is very similar to Spilosoma species, but male genitalia are different. The genus consists of only one species, Streltzovia caeria, which is found China.

== Subspecies ==
- Streltzovia caeria caeria (China: Qinghai, Gansu, Nei Mongol)
- Streltzovia caeria mienshanica (Daniel, 1943) (China: Hebei, Shanxi, Shaanxi, Nei Mongol, Heilongjiang)
- Streltzovia caeria streltzovi (Dubatolov, 1996) (China: northern Heilongjiang)
