= Satara (moth) =

Scientific classification
- Domain: Eukaryota
- Kingdom: Animalia
- Phylum: Arthropoda
- Class: Insecta
- Order: Lepidoptera
- Superfamily: Noctuoidea
- Family: Erebidae
- Subfamily: Arctiinae
- Subtribe: Spilosomina
- Genus: Satara; Walker, [1865]

Synonyms
- Arctioneura Felder, 1874

Genus of moths

Satara is a genus of moths in the family Erebidae from Sulawesi and South India. The genus was erected by Francis Walker in 1865.

== Species ==
=== Subgenus Satara Walker, 1865 ===
- Satara aequata Walker, [1865] (western Sulawesi)
- Satara lorquinii (Felder, 1874) (eastern Sulawesi)

=== Subgenus Owadasatara Dubatolov & Kishida, 2005 ===
- Satara everetti (Rothschild, 1910) (southern Sulawesi)
- Satara nympha Dubatolov & Kishida, 2005 (central Sulawesi)
- Satara cornutiata Kirti & Gill, 2008 (southern India: Karnataka).
