= Hollowayana =

Scientific classification
- Kingdom: Animalia
- Phylum: Arthropoda
- Clade: Pancrustacea
- Class: Insecta
- Order: Lepidoptera
- Superfamily: Noctuoidea
- Family: Erebidae
- Subfamily: Arctiinae
- Genus: Hollowayana; Dubatolov & Kishida, 2006
- Species: H. landaca

Binomial name
- Hollowayana landaca (Moore, 1859)

Synonyms
- Arctia landaca Moore, 1859

Genus of moths

Hollowayana is a genus of tiger moths in the family Erebidae. The genus contains only one species, Hollowayana landaca (Moore, 1859), which is found in Java, Bali, and Flores.
