= List of moths of Rwanda =

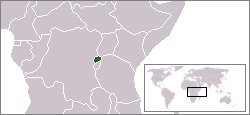
Location of Rwanda

There are about 220 known moth species of Rwanda. The moths (mostly nocturnal) and butterflies (mostly diurnal) together make up the taxonomic order Lepidoptera.

This is a list of moth species which have been recorded in Rwanda.

== Arctiidae ==
- Afrasura peripherica (Strand, 1912)
- Afrasura violacea (Cieslak & Häuser, 2006)
- Afroarctia bergeri Toulgoët, 1978
- Afroarctia histrionica Toulgoët, 1978
- Afroarctia kenyana (Rothschild, 1933)
- Afrojavanica kostlani (Gaede, 1923)
- Afrospilarctia lucida (Druce, 1898)
- Agaltara nebulosa Toulgoët, 1979
- Alpenus nigropunctata (Bethune-Baker, 1908)
- Amata alicia (Butler, 1876)
- Amata chrysozona (Hampson, 1898)
- Amata tomasina (Butler, 1876)
- Amerila bubo (Walker, 1855)
- Amerila luteibarba (Hampson, 1901)
- Amerila thermochroa (Hampson, 1916)
- Amphicallia pactolicus (Butler, 1888)
- Apisa fontainei Kiriakoff, 1959
- Apisa subargentea Joicey & Talbot, 1921
- Balacra compsa (Jordan, 1904)
- Balacra rattrayi (Rothschild, 1910)
- Carcinarctia laeliodes Hampson, 1916
- Cragia quadrinotata (Walker, 1864)
- Cyana hecqi Karisch & Dall'Asta, 2010
- Cyana paramargarethae Karisch & Dall'Asta, 2010
- Disparctia varicolor Toulgoët, 1978
- Galtara aurivilii (Pagenstecher, 1901)
- Galtara convergens Toulgoët, 1979
- Galtara elongata (Swinhoe, 1907)
- Galtara laportei Toulgoët, 1979
- Galtara reticulata (Hampson, 1909)
- Galtara turlini Toulgoët, 1979
- Kiriakoffalia costimacula (Joicey & Talbot, 1924)
- Mecistorhabdia haematoessa (Holland, 1893)
- Metarctia flavicincta Aurivillius, 1900
- Metarctia flora Kiriakoff, 1957
- Metarctia forsteri Kiriakoff, 1955
- Metarctia insignis Kiriakoff, 1959
- Metarctia lateritia Herrich-Schäffer, 1855
- Metarctia paremphares Holland, 1893
- Metarctia rubripuncta Hampson, 1898
- Metarctia rufescens Walker, 1855
- Paralpenus wintgensi (Strand, 1909)
- Pericaliella melanodisca (Hampson, 1907)
- Popoudina pamphilia Kiriakoff, 1958
- Pseudogaltara inexpectata Toulgoët, 1978
- Pseudothyretes perpusilla (Walker, 1856)
- Pusiola straminea (Hampson, 1901)
- Radiarctia melanochoria Hering, 1932
- Rhipidarctia crameri Kiriakoff, 1961
- Rhipidarctia forsteri (Kiriakoff, 1953)
- Rhipidarctia subminiata Kiriakoff, 1959
- Seydelia turlini Toulgoët, 1976
- Spilosoma sulphurea Bartel, 1903
- Teracotona multistrigata Joicey & Talbot, 1924
- Teracotona pallida Joicey & Talbot, 1924
- Teracotona translucens (Grünberg, 1907)
- Teracotona wittei (Debauche, 1942)
- Thumatha brunnea Kühne, 2007
- Trichaeta fulvescens (Walker, 1854)
- Utetheisa pulchella (Linnaeus, 1758)

== Bombycidae ==
- Racinoa spiralis Kühne, 2008

== Brahmaeidae ==
- Dactyloceras barnsi (Joicey & Talbot, 1924)

== Crambidae ==
- Ancylolomia capensis Zeller, 1852
- Ancylolomia gracilis Fawcett, 1917
- Ancylolomia planicosta Martin, 1956
- Angustalius malacellus (Duponchel, 1836)
- Autocharis sinualis (Hampson, 1899)
- Cadarena pudoraria (Hübner, 1825)
- Pyrausta flavimarginalis (Hampson, 1913)

== Eupterotidae ==
- Janomima mariana (White, 1843)

== Geometridae ==
- Acrostatheusis ruandana Herbulot, 1991
- Adicocrita aciculata Herbulot, 1983
- Antharmostes papilio Prout, 1912
- Antharmostes tutsiana Herbulot, 1996
- Asthenotricha anisobapta Prout, 1932
- Asthenotricha grandis Herbulot, 1997
- Bathycolpodes acutissima Herbulot, 1986
- Biston edwardsi (Prout, 1938)
- Blaboplutodes missilorum Prout, 1934
- Cartaletis melanopis Prout, 1929
- Chiasmia geminilinea (Prout, 1932)
- Chrysocraspeda hyalotypa (Prout, 1932)
- Cleora pavlitzkiae (D. S. Fletcher, 1958)
- Cleora rostella D. S. Fletcher, 1967
- Ectropis anisoides Herbulot, 1981
- Ectropis ocellata Warren, 1902
- Encoma irisaria Swinhoe, 1904
- Epigynopteryx venosa Herbulot, 1984
- Eupithecia dilucida (Warren, 1899)
- Eupithecia turlini Herbulot, 2001
- Eupithecia tutsiana Herbulot, 2001
- Hypochrosis banakaria (Plötz, 1880)
- Hypocoela turpisaria (Swinhoe, 1904)
- Hypomecis nessa Herbulot, 1995
- Idiodes flexilinea (Warren, 1898)
- Idiodes pectinata (Herbulot, 1966)
- Isoplenodia arabukoensis Sihvonen & Staude, 2010
- Mesomima tenuifascia (Holland, 1893)
- Piercia subrufaria (Warren, 1903)
- Pingasa distensaria (Walker, 1860)
- Prasinocyma leucocycla Herbulot, 1982
- Prasinocyma semicincta Herbulot, 1982
- Prasinocyma turlini Herbulot, 1982
- Pseudolarentia megalaria (Guenée, 1858)
- Psilocerea praecoca Herbulot, 1981
- Racotis angulosa Herbulot, 1973
- Rhodophthitus tricoloraria (Mabille, 1890)
- Scopula suda Prout, 1932
- Victoria perornata Warren, 1898
- Victoria subhyalina Herbulot, 1982
- Xanthisthisa tarsispina (Warren, 1901)
- Xanthorhoe ansorgei (Warren, 1899)
- Xanthorhoe exorista Prout, 1922
- Xanthorhoe heliopharia (Swinhoe, 1904)
- Xanthorhoe procne (Fawcett, 1916)
- Xanthorhoe transcissa (Warren, 1902)
- Xanthorhoe transjugata Prout, 1923
- Xanthorhoe trientata (Warren, 1901)
- Xylopteryx amieti Herbulot, 1973
- Xylopteryx anodina Herbulot, 1984
- Xylopteryx bifida Herbulot, 1984
- Xylopteryx clathrata Herbulot, 1984
- Xylopteryx dargei Herbulot, 1984
- Xylopteryx turlini Herbulot, 1984
- Zamarada bastelbergeri Gaede, 1915
- Zamarada canina Herbulot, 1983
- Zamarada delta D. S. Fletcher, 1974
- Zamarada dentata D. S. Fletcher, 1958
- Zamarada metrioscaphes Prout, 1912
- Zamarada montana Herbulot, 1979
- Zamarada plana Bastelberger, 1909
- Zamarada ruandana Herbulot, 1983

== Gracillariidae ==
- Corythoxestis aletreuta (Meyrick, 1936)
- Phyllonorycter adderis de Prins, 2012
- Phyllonorycter gato de Prins, 2012
- Phyllonorycter ipomoellus de Prins, 2012
- Phyllonorycter umukarus de Prins, 2012

== Lasiocampidae ==
- Lechriolepis gyldenstolpei Aurivillius, 1927
- Leipoxais tolmera Tams, 1929
- Pachytrina flamerchena Zolotuhin & Gurkovich, 2009
- Pachytrina philargyria (Hering, 1928)
- Philotherma apithana Hering, 1928
- Stoermeriana graberi (Dewitz, 1881)

== Lemoniidae ==
- Sabalia jacksoni Sharpe, 1890

== Lymantriidae ==
- Aroa discalis Walker, 1855
- Crorema adspersa (Herrich-Schäffer, 1854)
- Dasychira chorista Hering, 1926
- Eudasychira georgiana (Fawcett, 1900)
- Euproctis cryphia Collenette, 1960
- Euproctis nessa Swinhoe, 1903
- Euproctis pallida (Kirby, 1896)
- Homochira ruandana Hering, 1926
- Laelia eutricha Collenette, 1931
- Laelia rogersi Bethune-Baker, 1913
- Leucoma parva (Plötz, 1880)
- Mylantria xanthospila (Plötz, 1880)
- Neomardara africana (Holland, 1893)
- Porthesaroa noctua Hering, 1926
- Ruanda aetheria Strand, 1909

== Metarbelidae ==
- Mountelgonia pagana (Strand, 1909)

== Noctuidae ==
- Achaea finita (Guenée, 1852)
- Acontia imitatrix Wallengren, 1856
- Aegocera obliqua Mabille, 1893
- Aegocera rectilinea Boisduval, 1836
- Ametropalpis vidua (Holland, 1894)
- Callopistria maillardi (Guenée, 1862)
- Carpostalagma chalybeata Talbot, 1929
- Crameria amabilis (Drury, 1773)
- Cyligramma fluctuosa (Drury, 1773)
- Dichromia mutilata (Strand, 1909)
- Eudocima fullonia (Clerck, 1764)
- Feliniopsis laportei Hacker & Fibiger, 2007
- Heraclia aemulatrix (Westwood, 1881)
- Heraclia superba (Butler, 1875)
- Masalia galatheae (Wallengren, 1856)
- Mazuca elegantissima Janse, 1939
- Meristides umbripennis Strand, 1909
- Mitrophrys menete (Cramer, 1775)
- Oraesia wintgensi (Strand, 1909)
- Soloe splendida Toulgoët, 1980
- Sphingomorpha chlorea (Cramer, 1777)
- Trigonodes hyppasia (Cramer, 1779)
- Ulotrichopus pseudocatocala (Strand, 1918)

== Notodontidae ==
- Antheua delicata Bethune-Baker, 1911
- Antheua gallans (Karsch, 1895)
- Antheua trifasciata (Hampson, 1909)
- Boscawenia rectangulata (Gaede, 1928)
- Desmeocraera analis Kiriakoff, 1954
- Epidonta duplicata Kiriakoff, 1962
- Epidonta inconspicua Kiriakoff, 1962
- Epimetula albipuncta (Gaede, 1928)
- Pseudobarobata angulata Gaede, 1928
- Rhenea mediata (Walker, 1865)
- Scrancia leucopera Hampson, 1910

== Pterophoridae ==
- Platyptilia rhyncholoba Meyrick, 1924

== Pyralidae ==
- Aglossa basalis Walker, 1865
- Ematheudes neonepsia Martin, 1956

== Saturniidae ==
- Lobobunaea acetes (Westwood, 1849)
- Lobobunaea ansorgei (Rothschild, 1899)
- Lobobunaea jeanneli Rougeot, 1959
- Lobobunaea turlini Lemaire, 1977
- Orthogonioptilum adiegetum Karsch, 1892
- Pselaphelia vandenberghei Bouyer, 1992
- Tagoropsis rougeoti D. S. Fletcher, 1952
- Urota centralis Bouyer, 2008

== Sphingidae ==
- Dovania poecila Rothschild & Jordan, 1903
- Hippotion eson (Cramer, 1779)
- Macroglossum trochilus (Hübner, 1823)
- Macropoliana ferax (Rothschild & Jordan, 1916)
- Nephele monostigma Clark, 1925
- Temnora scheveni Carcasson, 1968
- Temnora subapicalis Rothschild & Jordan, 1903
- Temnora turlini Darge, 1975

== Thyrididae ==
- Lamprochrysa scintillans (Butler, 1893)
- Marmax vicaria (Walker, 1854)

== Tineidae ==
- Cimitra fetialis (Meyrick, 1917)
- Cimitra horridella (Walker, 1863)
- Cubitofusa pseudoglebata (Gozmány, 1967)
- Dasyses centralis Gozmány, 1967
- Hapsifera glebata Meyrick, 1908
- Hapsifera revoluta Meyrick, 1914
- Perissomastix lala Gozmány, 1967
- Perissomastix pyroxantha (Meyrick, 1914)

== Tischeriidae ==
- Tischeria kuehnei Mey, 2010

== Tortricidae ==
- Cochylimorpha exoterica (Meyrick, 1924)
- Thaumatotibia leucotreta (Meyrick, 1913)
- Trachybyrsis euglypta Meyrick, 1927

== Zygaenidae ==
- Epiorna abessynica (Koch, 1865)

== See also ==
- List of birds of Rwanda
- List of butterflies of Rwanda
- List of mammals of Rwanda
