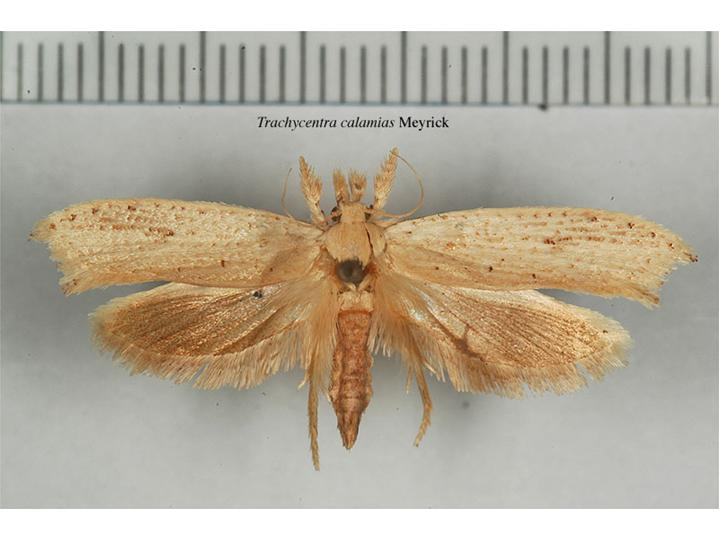
- Trachycentra calamias

Scientific classification
- Kingdom: Animalia
- Phylum: Arthropoda
- Clade: Pancrustacea
- Class: Insecta
- Order: Lepidoptera
- Family: Tineidae
- Subfamily: Hapsiferinae; Gozmány, 1968

Type genus
- Hapsifera Zeller, 1847

= Hapsiferinae =

Subfamily of moths

The Hapsiferinae are a subfamily of moth of the family Tineidae.

== Genera ==
- Agorarcha
- Briaraula
- Callocosmeta
- Chrysocrata
- Cimitra
- Colobocrossa
- Cubitofusa
- Cynomastix
- Dasyses
- Hapsifera Zeller, 1847
- Hapsiferona
- Paraptica
- Parochmastis Meyrick, 1917 (species from New Zealand and Australia)
- Phyciodyta
- Pitharcha
- Rhinophyllis
- Tiquadra Walker, 1863
- Trachycentra
- Zygosignata
