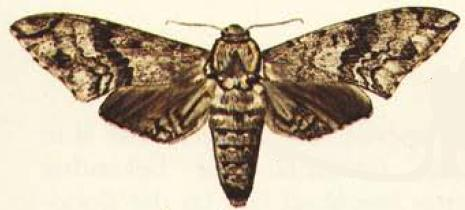

Scientific classification
- Kingdom: Animalia
- Phylum: Arthropoda
- Clade: Pancrustacea
- Class: Insecta
- Order: Lepidoptera
- Family: Sphingidae
- Genus: Macropoliana
- Species: M. natalensis

Binomial name
- Macropoliana natalensis (Butler, 1875)

Synonyms
- Diludia natalensis Butler, 1875; Macropoliana oheffernani Gess, 1967; Acherontia spei Butler, 1875

= Macropoliana natalensis =

Species of moth

Macropoliana natalensis is a moth of the family Sphingidae. It is known from forests and moist woodlands from KwaZulu-Natal to Ethiopia and westwards to Cameroon, Ghana and Sierra Leone.

The length of the forewings is 55–70 mm for males and 65–75 mm for females. The wingspan is 107–126 mm.

The larvae feed on Spathodea nilotica, Spathodea campanulata, Markhamia lutea and Brachystegia species.
