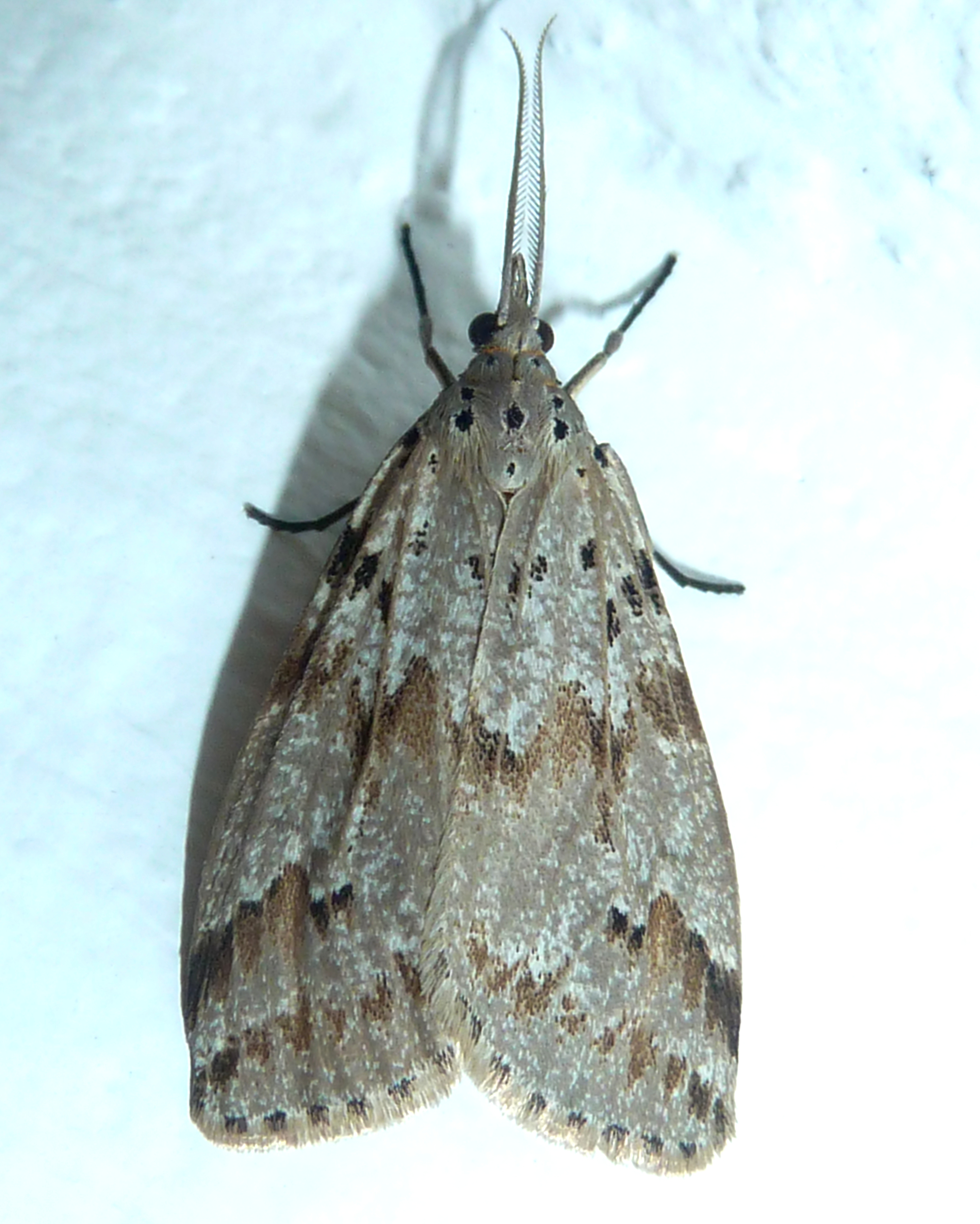

Scientific classification
- Kingdom: Animalia
- Phylum: Arthropoda
- Clade: Pancrustacea
- Class: Insecta
- Order: Lepidoptera
- Superfamily: Noctuoidea
- Family: Erebidae
- Subfamily: Arctiinae
- Genus: Galtara
- Species: G. rostrata

Binomial name
- Galtara rostrata Wallengren, 1860

Synonyms
- Diota privata (Walker, 1865); Diota pustularia (Walker, 1863); Diota rostrata (Wallengren, 1860); Galtara griseotincta Strand, 1919; Galtara privata Walker, 1865; Galtara pustularia Walker, 1862

= Galtara rostrata =

Species of moth

Galtara rostrata is a species of moth of the subfamily Arctiinae first described by Wallengren in 1860. It is found in South Africa, Eswatini, Zimbabwe, Kenya and Ethiopia.

The length of the forewings is 13–16 mm. Adults are cream coloured with brown mottling and darker shades as well as a few black dots in the basal, medial and post medial areas on the forewings.

The larvae feed on a wide range of plants including Senecio species (including S. angulatus, S. tamoides and S. oxyodontus), Delairea odorata, Mikaniopsis cissampelina, Kleinia abyssinica, Carthamus tinctorius, Daucus carota and Bidens pilosa.
