= Popoudina lemniscata =

Scientific classification
- Domain: Eukaryota
- Kingdom: Animalia
- Phylum: Arthropoda
- Class: Insecta
- Order: Lepidoptera
- Superfamily: Noctuoidea
- Family: Erebidae
- Subfamily: Arctiinae
- Genus: Popoudina
- Species: P. lemniscata

Binomial name
- Popoudina lemniscata (Distant, 1898)

Synonyms
- Spilosoma lemniscata Distant, 1898

Species of moth

Popoudina lemniscata is a moth of the family Erebidae. It was described by William Lucas Distant in 1898. It is found in Kenya, Lesotho, South Africa and Zimbabwe.
