= Soloe tripunctata =

Scientific classification
- Kingdom: Animalia
- Phylum: Arthropoda
- Class: Insecta
- Order: Lepidoptera
- Superfamily: Noctuoidea
- Family: Erebidae
- Genus: Soloe
- Species: S. tripunctata

Binomial name
- Soloe tripunctata H. Druce, 1896

Species of moth

Soloe tripunctata is a moth in the family Erebidae first described by Herbert Druce in 1896. It is found in Tanzania.
