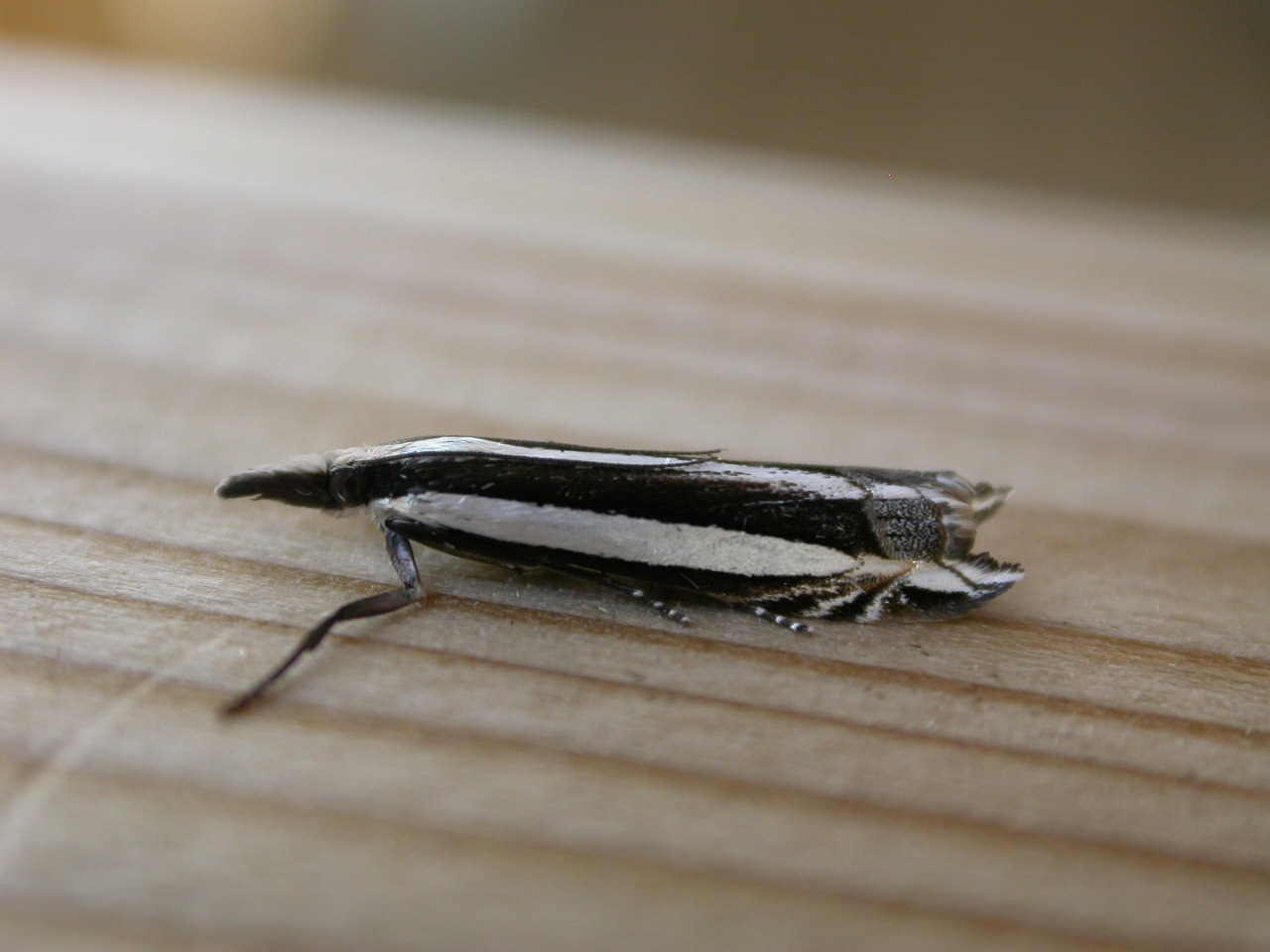
- Angustalius malacellus

Scientific classification
- Kingdom: Animalia
- Phylum: Arthropoda
- Clade: Pancrustacea
- Class: Insecta
- Order: Lepidoptera
- Family: Crambidae
- Subfamily: Crambinae
- Tribe: Crambini
- Genus: Angustalius; Marion, 1954

Synonyms
- Bleszynskia Lattin, 1961; Crambopsis Lattin, 1952

= Angustalius =

Genus of moths

Angustalius is a genus of moths of the family Crambidae.

== Species ==
- Angustalius besucheti (Bleszynski, 1963)
- Angustalius casandra Bassi in Bassi & Trematerra, 2014
- Angustalius ditaeniellus Marion, 1954
- Angustalius malacelloides (Bleszynski, 1955)
- Angustalius malacellus (Duponchel, 1836)
- Angustalius philippiellus Viette, 1970

== Former species ==
- Angustalius hapaliscus (Zeller, 1852)
