= Dasyses =

Scientific classification
- Kingdom: Animalia
- Phylum: Arthropoda
- Clade: Pancrustacea
- Class: Insecta
- Order: Lepidoptera
- Family: Tineidae
- Subfamily: Hapsiferinae
- Genus: Dasyses; Durrant, 1903

Type species
- Cerostoma rugosella Stainton, 1859

Genus of moths

Dasyses is a genus of moths, belonging to the family Tineidae.
