= Rhipidarctia silacea =

Scientific classification
- Domain: Eukaryota
- Kingdom: Animalia
- Phylum: Arthropoda
- Class: Insecta
- Order: Lepidoptera
- Superfamily: Noctuoidea
- Family: Erebidae
- Subfamily: Arctiinae
- Genus: Rhipidarctia
- Species: R. silacea

Binomial name
- Rhipidarctia silacea (Plötz, 1880)

Synonyms
- Plegapteryx silacea Plötz, 1880

Species of moth

Rhipidarctia silacea is a moth in the family Erebidae. It was described by Plötz in 1880. It is found in Nigeria.
