= Radiarctia =

Scientific classification
- Kingdom: Animalia
- Phylum: Arthropoda
- Clade: Pancrustacea
- Class: Insecta
- Order: Lepidoptera
- Superfamily: Noctuoidea
- Family: Erebidae
- Subfamily: Arctiinae
- Subtribe: Spilosomina
- Genus: Radiarctia; Dubatolov, 2006

Type species
- Diacrisia jacksoni Rothschild, 1910

Genus of moths

Radiarctia is a genus of moths in the family Erebidae from Afrotropics.

== Species ==
- Radiarctia jacksoni (Rothschild, 1910)
- Radiarctia screabile (Wallengren, 1875)
  - Radiarctia screabile nyangana Haynes, 2011
- Radiarctia melanochoria (Hering, 1932)
- Radiarctia sinefascia (Hampson, 1916)
