= Cimitra =

Scientific classification
- Kingdom: Animalia
- Phylum: Arthropoda
- Clade: Pancrustacea
- Class: Insecta
- Order: Lepidoptera
- Family: Tineidae
- Subfamily: Hapsiferinae
- Genus: Cimitra; Walker, 1864

Synonyms
- Scalidomia Walsingham, 1891

Genus of moths

Cimitra is a genus of moths belonging to the family of Tineidae. Most species of this genus are found in Africa but Cimitra sechusella Walker, 1864 is found in Southeast Asia.

== Species ==
Species of this genus are:

- Cimitra efformata (Gozmány, 1965)
- Cimitra estimata (Gozmány, 1965)
- Cimitra fetialis (Meyrick, 1917)
- Cimitra horridella (Walker, 1863)
- Cimitra platyloxa (Meyrick, 1930)
- Cimitra spinignatha (Gozmány, 1968)
- Cimitra sechusella Walker, 1864
- Cimitra texturata (Gozmány, 1967)
