= Ematheudes tunesiella =

Scientific classification
- Domain: Eukaryota
- Kingdom: Animalia
- Phylum: Arthropoda
- Class: Insecta
- Order: Lepidoptera
- Family: Pyralidae
- Genus: Ematheudes
- Species: E. tunesiella

Binomial name
- Ematheudes tunesiella Ragonot in Staudinger, 1892

Species of moth

Ematheudes tunesiella is a species of snout moth in the genus Ematheudes. It was described Ragonot in 1892, and was described from Tunisia, from which its species epithet is derived. It is also found in Italy.
