= Galtara colettae =

Scientific classification
- Kingdom: Animalia
- Phylum: Arthropoda
- Class: Insecta
- Order: Lepidoptera
- Superfamily: Noctuoidea
- Family: Erebidae
- Subfamily: Arctiinae
- Genus: Galtara
- Species: G. colettae

Binomial name
- Galtara colettae Toulgoët, 1976

Species of moth

Galtara colettae is a moth of the subfamily Arctiinae. Hervé de Toulgoët described it in 1976, and it occurs on the Comoros.
