= Angustalius casandra =

Scientific classification
- Kingdom: Animalia
- Phylum: Arthropoda
- Clade: Pancrustacea
- Class: Insecta
- Order: Lepidoptera
- Family: Crambidae
- Subfamily: Crambinae
- Tribe: Crambini
- Genus: Angustalius
- Species: A. casandra

Binomial name
- Angustalius casandra Bassi in Bassi & Trematerra, 2014

Species of moth

Angustalius casandra is a moth in the family Crambidae. It was described by Graziano Bassi in 2014. It is found in Mozambique.
