= Ematheudes hamatus =

Scientific classification
- Domain: Eukaryota
- Kingdom: Animalia
- Phylum: Arthropoda
- Class: Insecta
- Order: Lepidoptera
- Family: Pyralidae
- Genus: Ematheudes
- Species: E. hamatus

Binomial name
- Ematheudes hamatus J. C. Shaffer, 1998

Species of moth

Ematheudes hamatus is a species of snout moth in the genus Ematheudes. It was described by Jay C. Shaffer in 1998 and is known from Zambia.
