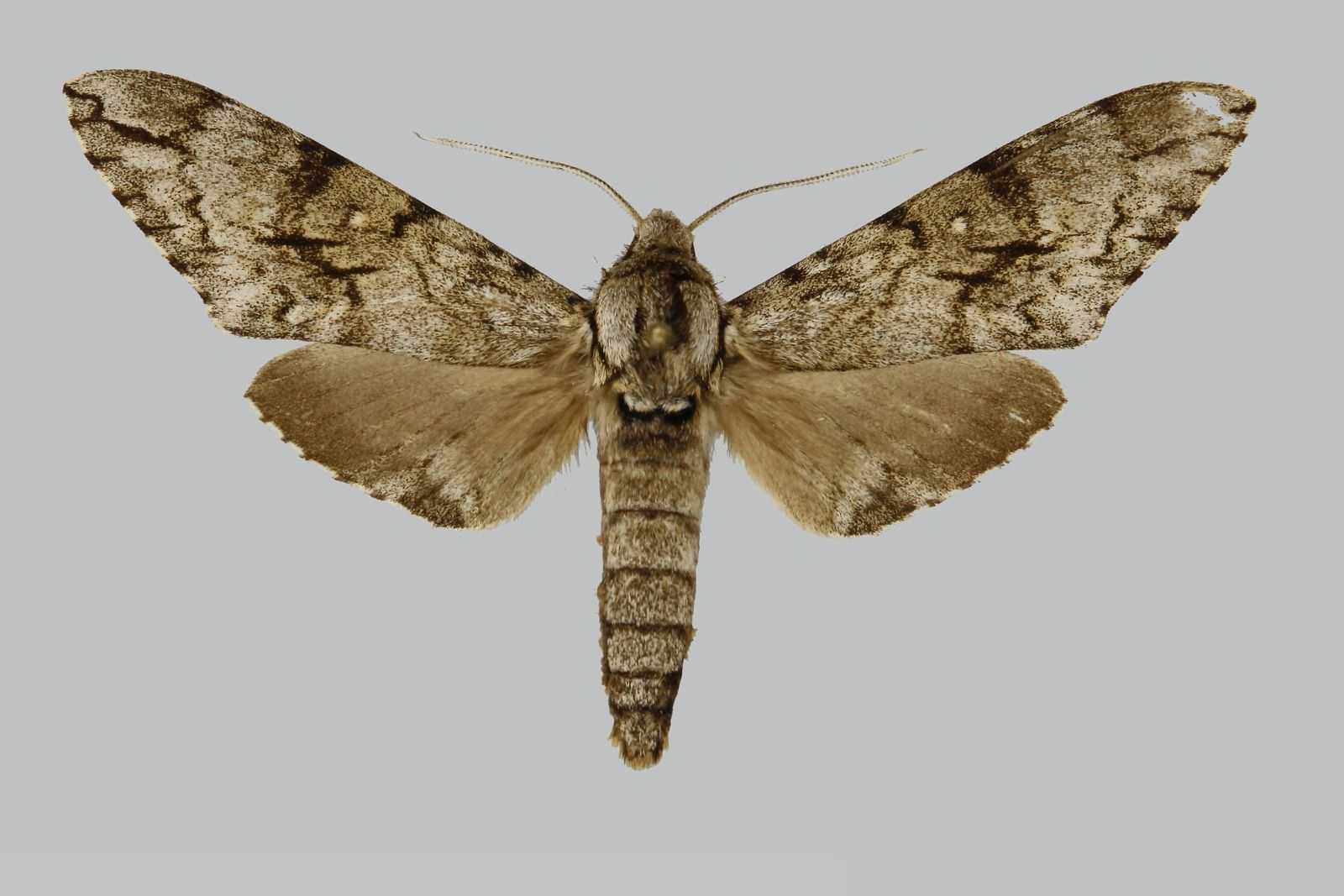
- Male

Scientific classification
- Domain: Eukaryota
- Kingdom: Animalia
- Phylum: Arthropoda
- Class: Insecta
- Order: Lepidoptera
- Family: Sphingidae
- Genus: Macropoliana
- Species: M. cadioui

Binomial name
- Macropoliana cadioui Haxaire & Camiade, 2008

= Macropoliana cadioui =

Species of moth

Macropoliana cadioui is a moth of the family Sphingidae. It is known from Eritrea.
