= Popoudina kovtunovitchi =

Scientific classification
- Kingdom: Animalia
- Phylum: Arthropoda
- Clade: Pancrustacea
- Class: Insecta
- Order: Lepidoptera
- Superfamily: Noctuoidea
- Family: Erebidae
- Subfamily: Arctiinae
- Genus: Popoudina
- Species: P. kovtunovitchi

Binomial name
- Popoudina kovtunovitchi Dubatolov, 2011

Species of moth

Popoudina kovtunovitchi is a moth in the family Erebidae. It was described by Vladimir Viktorovitch Dubatolov in 2011. It is found in Zimbabwe.
