= Macropoliana scheveni =

Scientific classification
- Kingdom: Animalia
- Phylum: Arthropoda
- Class: Insecta
- Order: Lepidoptera
- Family: Sphingidae
- Genus: Macropoliana
- Species: M. scheveni

Binomial name
- Macropoliana scheveni Carcasson, 1972

Species of moth

Macropoliana scheveni is a moth of the family Sphingidae. It is known from Tanzania.
