= Angustalius philippiellus =

Scientific classification
- Kingdom: Animalia
- Phylum: Arthropoda
- Clade: Pancrustacea
- Class: Insecta
- Order: Lepidoptera
- Family: Crambidae
- Subfamily: Crambinae
- Tribe: Crambini
- Genus: Angustalius
- Species: A. philippiellus

Binomial name
- Angustalius philippiellus Viette, 1970

Species of moth

Angustalius philippiellus is a moth of the Crambinae family described by Pierre Viette in 1970. It is known from northern Madagascar.

It has a wingspan of 32–33 mm with a length of the forewings of 16.5–17 mm.
