= Rhipidarctia flaviceps =

Scientific classification
- Kingdom: Animalia
- Phylum: Arthropoda
- Class: Insecta
- Order: Lepidoptera
- Superfamily: Noctuoidea
- Family: Erebidae
- Subfamily: Arctiinae
- Genus: Rhipidarctia
- Species: R. flaviceps

Binomial name
- Rhipidarctia flaviceps (Hampson, 1898)

Synonyms
- Metarctia flaviceps Hampson, 1898; Rhipidarctia cornelia Kiriakoff, 1957; Rhipidarctia pallidipes Aurivillius, 1925; Elsa rubrosuffusa Kiriakoff, 1953

Species of moth

Rhipidarctia flaviceps is a moth in the family Erebidae. It was described by George Hampson in 1898. It is found in Cameroon, the Democratic Republic of the Congo, Equatorial Guinea, Nigeria and Togo.
