= Soloe =

Scientific classification
- Kingdom: Animalia
- Phylum: Arthropoda
- Class: Insecta
- Order: Lepidoptera
- Superfamily: Noctuoidea
- Family: Erebidae
- Subfamily: Aganainae
- Genus: Soloe; Walker, 1854

Genus of moths

Soloe is a genus of moths in the family Erebidae. The genus was erected by Francis Walker in 1854.

== Species ==
- Soloe fumipennis Hampson, 1910
- Soloe sexmaculata (Plötz, 1880)
- Soloe splendida Toulgoët, 1980
- Soloe trigutta Walker, 1854
- Soloe tripunctata Druce, 1896
