= Ematheudes crassinotella =

Scientific classification
- Domain: Eukaryota
- Kingdom: Animalia
- Phylum: Arthropoda
- Class: Insecta
- Order: Lepidoptera
- Family: Pyralidae
- Genus: Ematheudes
- Species: E. crassinotella

Binomial name
- Ematheudes crassinotella Ragonot, 1888

Species of moth

Ematheudes crassinotella is a species of snout moth in the genus Ematheudes. It was described by Ragonot in 1888, and is known from South Africa.
