= Galtara pulverata =

Scientific classification
- Kingdom: Animalia
- Phylum: Arthropoda
- Class: Insecta
- Order: Lepidoptera
- Superfamily: Noctuoidea
- Family: Erebidae
- Subfamily: Arctiinae
- Genus: Galtara
- Species: G. pulverata

Binomial name
- Galtara pulverata (Hampson, 1900)

Synonyms
- Secusio pulverata Hampson, 1900

Species of moth

Galtara pulverata is a moth of the subfamily Arctiinae. It was described by George Hampson in 1900. It is found in South Africa.
