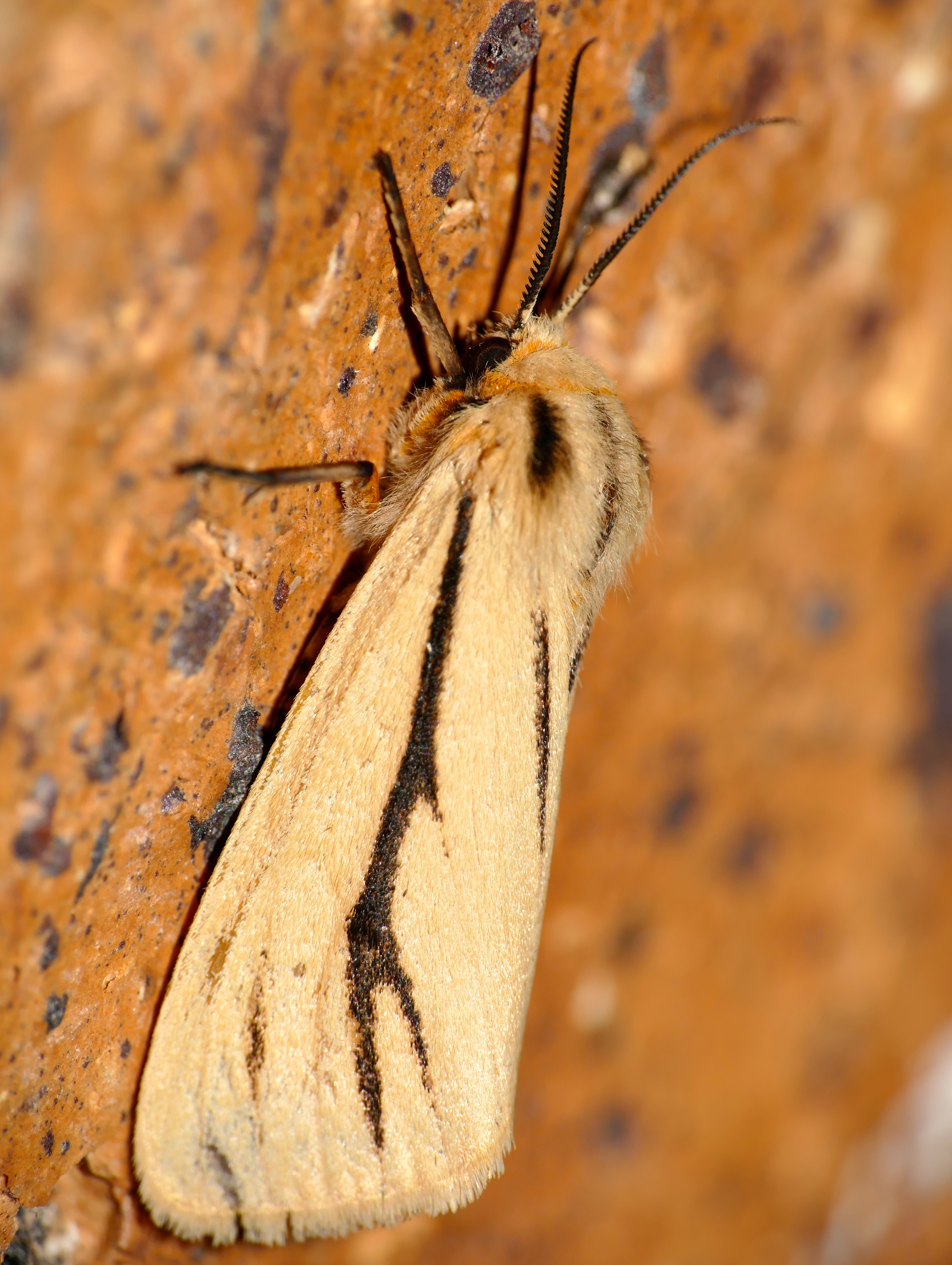

Scientific classification
- Kingdom: Animalia
- Phylum: Arthropoda
- Class: Insecta
- Order: Lepidoptera
- Superfamily: Noctuoidea
- Family: Erebidae
- Subfamily: Arctiinae
- Genus: Popoudina
- Species: P. linea

Binomial name
- Popoudina linea (Walker, 1855)

Synonyms
- Spilosoma linea Walker, 1855; Lacidas lineata Butler, 1875; Spilosoma strigatum Wallengren, 1860; Spilosoma truncatum Walker, 1856

= Popoudina linea =

Species of moth

Popoudina linea is a moth of the family Erebidae. It was described by Francis Walker in 1855. It is found in Ethiopia, Kenya and South Africa.
