= Rhipidarctia xenops =

Scientific classification
- Domain: Eukaryota
- Kingdom: Animalia
- Phylum: Arthropoda
- Class: Insecta
- Order: Lepidoptera
- Superfamily: Noctuoidea
- Family: Erebidae
- Subfamily: Arctiinae
- Genus: Rhipidarctia
- Species: R. xenops

Binomial name
- Rhipidarctia xenops (Kiriakoff, 1957)

Synonyms
- Takwa xenops Kiriakoff, 1957

Species of moth

Rhipidarctia xenops is a moth in the family Erebidae. It was described by Sergius G. Kiriakoff in 1957. It is found in Ghana.
