= Ematheudes rhizolineata =

Scientific classification
- Domain: Eukaryota
- Kingdom: Animalia
- Phylum: Arthropoda
- Class: Insecta
- Order: Lepidoptera
- Family: Pyralidae
- Genus: Ematheudes
- Species: E. rhizolineata

Binomial name
- Ematheudes rhizolineata (Bradley, 1980)

Synonyms
- Patna rhizolineata Bradley, 1980

Species of moth

Ematheudes rhizolineata is a species of snout moth in the genus Ematheudes. It was described by John David Bradley in 1980 in the genus Patna and is known from Pakistan. Shaffer (1998) transferred the species to the genus Ematheudes.

The larvae have been reared from the rhizomes of Sorghum halepense.
