= Popoudina aliena =

Scientific classification
- Kingdom: Animalia
- Phylum: Arthropoda
- Class: Insecta
- Order: Lepidoptera
- Superfamily: Noctuoidea
- Family: Erebidae
- Subfamily: Arctiinae
- Genus: Popoudina
- Species: P. aliena

Binomial name
- Popoudina aliena (Kiriakoff, 1954)

Synonyms
- Amsacta aliena Kiriakoff, 1954

Species of moth

Popoudina aliena is a moth in the family Erebidae. It was described by Sergius G. Kiriakoff in 1954. It is found in the Democratic Republic of the Congo.
