= Angustalius ditaeniellus =

Scientific classification
- Kingdom: Animalia
- Phylum: Arthropoda
- Clade: Pancrustacea
- Class: Insecta
- Order: Lepidoptera
- Family: Crambidae
- Subfamily: Crambinae
- Tribe: Crambini
- Genus: Angustalius
- Species: A. ditaeniellus

Binomial name
- Angustalius ditaeniellus Marion, 1954

Species of moth

Angustalius ditaeniellus is a moth in the family Crambidae. It was described by Hubert Marion in 1954. It is found on Madagascar.
