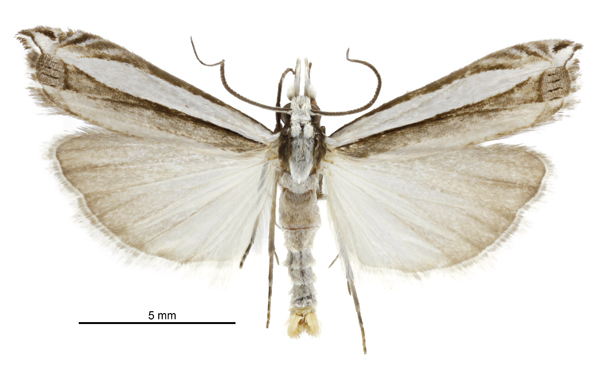

Scientific classification
- Kingdom: Animalia
- Phylum: Arthropoda
- Clade: Pancrustacea
- Class: Insecta
- Order: Lepidoptera
- Family: Crambidae
- Subfamily: Crambinae
- Tribe: Crambini
- Genus: Angustalius
- Species: A. malacelloides

Binomial name
- Angustalius malacelloides (Błeszyński, 1955)

Synonyms
- Crambopsis malacelloides Błeszyński, 1955; Bleszynskia mallacelloides Hua, 2005; Crambopsis malacelloides javaicus Błeszyński, 1955; Crambus malacellus

= Angustalius malacelloides =

Species of moth

Angustalius malacelloides is a moth in the family Crambidae. It was described by Stanisław Błeszyński in 1955. It is found in the Himalayas, India, Sri Lanka, China (Guangdong), Malaysia, Java, Australia (Tasmania) and New Zealand.

== Subspecies ==
- Angustalius malacelloides malacelloides (Australia)
- Angustalius malacelloides javaicus (Błeszyński, 1955) (Java)
