= Rhipidarctia cinctella =

Scientific classification
- Domain: Eukaryota
- Kingdom: Animalia
- Phylum: Arthropoda
- Class: Insecta
- Order: Lepidoptera
- Superfamily: Noctuoidea
- Family: Erebidae
- Subfamily: Arctiinae
- Genus: Rhipidarctia
- Species: R. cinctella

Binomial name
- Rhipidarctia cinctella (Kiriakoff, 1953)

Synonyms
- Metarctia cinctella Kiriakoff, 1953; Rhipidarctia strenua Kiriakoff, 1957

Species of moth

Rhipidarctia cinctella is a moth in the subfamily Arctiinae. It was described by Sergius G. Kiriakoff in 1953. It is found in the Democratic Republic of the Congo.
