= Afroarctia sjostedti =

Scientific classification
- Domain: Eukaryota
- Kingdom: Animalia
- Phylum: Arthropoda
- Class: Insecta
- Order: Lepidoptera
- Superfamily: Noctuoidea
- Family: Erebidae
- Subfamily: Arctiinae
- Genus: Afroarctia
- Species: A. sjostedti

Binomial name
- Afroarctia sjostedti (Aurivillius, 1899 [1900])

Synonyms
- Spilosoma sjostedti Aurivillius, 1899

Species of moth

Afroarctia sjostedti is a moth of the family Erebidae. It was described by Per Olof Christopher Aurivillius in 1899 and is found in Ivory Coast, Nigeria and Cameroon.
