= Macropoliana afarorum =

Scientific classification
- Domain: Eukaryota
- Kingdom: Animalia
- Phylum: Arthropoda
- Class: Insecta
- Order: Lepidoptera
- Family: Sphingidae
- Genus: Macropoliana
- Species: M. afarorum

Binomial name
- Macropoliana afarorum Rougeot, 1975

Species of moth

Macropoliana afarorum is a moth of the family Sphingidae. It is known from Djibouti.
