= Ematheudes straminella =

Scientific classification
- Kingdom: Animalia
- Phylum: Arthropoda
- Class: Insecta
- Order: Lepidoptera
- Family: Pyralidae
- Genus: Ematheudes
- Species: E. straminella

Binomial name
- Ematheudes straminella Snellen, 1872

Synonyms
- Emmatheudes lentistrigalis Hampson, 1909

Species of moth

Ematheudes straminella is a species of snout moth in the genus Ematheudes. It was described by Snellen in 1872, and is known from Angola, the Democratic Republic of Congo, Ghana, Kenya, South Africa and Uganda.
