= Popoudina =

Scientific classification
- Kingdom: Animalia
- Phylum: Arthropoda
- Clade: Pancrustacea
- Class: Insecta
- Order: Lepidoptera
- Superfamily: Noctuoidea
- Family: Erebidae
- Subfamily: Arctiinae
- Subtribe: Spilosomina
- Genus: Popoudina; Dubatolov, 2006

Type species
- Estigmene pamphilia Kiriakoff, 1958

Genus of moths

Popoudina is a genus of moths in the family Erebidae from the Afrotropics. The genus was erected by Vladimir Viktorovitch Dubatolov in 2006. Formerly, species of this genus were mistakenly included in Estigmene. Probably, some species of the latter genus might belong to Popoudina.

== Species ==
- Popoudina aliena (Kiriakoff, 1954)
- Popoudina dorsalis (Walker, 1855)
- Popoudina griseipennis (Bartel, 1903)
- Popoudina leighi (Rothschild, 1910)
- Popoudina lemniscata (Distant, 1898)
- Popoudina linea (Walker, 1855)
- Popoudina kovtunovitchi Dubatolov, 2011
- Popoudina pamphilia (Kiriakoff, 1958)

=== Subgenus Pseudopopoudina Dubatolov, 2006 ===
- Popoudina brosi (Toulgoët, 1986)
