= Popoudina leighi =

Scientific classification
- Domain: Eukaryota
- Kingdom: Animalia
- Phylum: Arthropoda
- Class: Insecta
- Order: Lepidoptera
- Superfamily: Noctuoidea
- Family: Erebidae
- Subfamily: Arctiinae
- Genus: Popoudina
- Species: P. leighi

Binomial name
- Popoudina leighi (Rothschild, 1910)

Synonyms
- Diacrisia leighi Rothschild, 1910; Spilosoma leighi

Species of moth

Popoudina leighi is a moth in the family Erebidae. It was described by Rothschild in 1910. It is found in South Africa.
