= Cynomastix =

Scientific classification
- Kingdom: Animalia
- Phylum: Arthropoda
- Clade: Pancrustacea
- Class: Insecta
- Order: Lepidoptera
- Family: Tineidae
- Subfamily: Hapsiferinae
- Genus: Cynomastix; Meyrick, 1930
- Species: C. rhothodoxa

Binomial name
- Cynomastix rhothodoxa Meyrick, 1930

Genus of moths

Cynomastix is a genus of moths belonging to the family Tineidae. This is a monotypic genus, containing the sole species Cynomastix rhothodoxa from New Caledonia.
