= Hapsifera luridella =

Scientific classification
- Kingdom: Animalia
- Phylum: Arthropoda
- Clade: Pancrustacea
- Class: Insecta
- Order: Lepidoptera
- Family: Tineidae
- Genus: Hapsifera
- Species: H. luridella

Binomial name
- Hapsifera luridella Zeller, 1847

Synonyms
- Hapsifera eburnea Butler, 1881; Tinea pustulatella Lucas, 1942

Species of moth

Hapsifera luridella is a moth of the family Tineidae. It is known from the palearctic Region, Europe, and from Irak, Turkey and from Oman, Saudi Arabia and Yemen.
