= Galtara notabilis =

Scientific classification
- Kingdom: Animalia
- Phylum: Arthropoda
- Class: Insecta
- Order: Lepidoptera
- Superfamily: Noctuoidea
- Family: Erebidae
- Subfamily: Arctiinae
- Genus: Galtara
- Species: G. notabilis

Binomial name
- Galtara notabilis Toulgoët, 1980

Species of moth

Galtara notabilis is a moth of the subfamily Arctiinae. It was described by Hervé de Toulgoët in 1980. It is found in the Democratic Republic of the Congo.
