= Paraptica =

Scientific classification
- Kingdom: Animalia
- Phylum: Arthropoda
- Clade: Pancrustacea
- Class: Insecta
- Order: Lepidoptera
- Family: Tineidae
- Subfamily: Hapsiferinae
- Genus: Paraptica; Meyrick, 1917

Genus of moths

Paraptica is a genus of moths belonging to the family Tineidae.

== Species ==
- Paraptica concinerata Meyrick, 1917 (from South Africa & Zambia)
- Paraptica micraula (Gozmány, 2004) (from Namibia)
