= Ematheudes persicella =

Scientific classification
- Domain: Eukaryota
- Kingdom: Animalia
- Phylum: Arthropoda
- Class: Insecta
- Order: Lepidoptera
- Family: Pyralidae
- Genus: Ematheudes
- Species: E. persicella

Binomial name
- Ematheudes persicella (Amsel, 1961)

Synonyms
- Proavitheudes persicella Amsel, 1961

Species of moth

Ematheudes persicella is a species of snout moth in the genus Ematheudes. It was described by Hans Georg Amsel in 1961 and is known from Iran.
