= Ematheudes neurias =

Scientific classification
- Kingdom: Animalia
- Phylum: Arthropoda
- Class: Insecta
- Order: Lepidoptera
- Family: Pyralidae
- Genus: Ematheudes
- Species: E. neurias

Binomial name
- Ematheudes neurias (Hampson, 1918)

Synonyms
- Commotria neurias Hampson, 1918; Commotria erythrograpta Hampson, 1918

Species of moth

Ematheudes neurias is a species of snout moth in the genus Ematheudes. It was described by George Hampson in 1918 and is known from Malawi and South Africa.
