= Popoudina dorsalis =

Scientific classification
- Kingdom: Animalia
- Phylum: Arthropoda
- Class: Insecta
- Order: Lepidoptera
- Superfamily: Noctuoidea
- Family: Erebidae
- Subfamily: Arctiinae
- Genus: Popoudina
- Species: P. dorsalis

Binomial name
- Popoudina dorsalis (Walker, 1855)

Synonyms
- Spilosoma dorsalis Walker, 1855

Species of moth

Popoudina dorsalis is a moth of the family Erebidae. It was described by Francis Walker in 1855. It is found in South Africa.
