= Popoudina griseipennis =

Scientific classification
- Domain: Eukaryota
- Kingdom: Animalia
- Phylum: Arthropoda
- Class: Insecta
- Order: Lepidoptera
- Superfamily: Noctuoidea
- Family: Erebidae
- Subfamily: Arctiinae
- Genus: Popoudina
- Species: P. griseipennis

Binomial name
- Popoudina griseipennis (Bartel, 1903)

Synonyms
- Spilosoma griseipennis Bartel, 1903

Species of moth

Popoudina griseipennis is a moth of the family Erebidae. It was described by Max Bartel in 1903. It is found in Angola and South Africa.
