= Ematheudes setigera =

Scientific classification
- Domain: Eukaryota
- Kingdom: Animalia
- Phylum: Arthropoda
- Class: Insecta
- Order: Lepidoptera
- Family: Pyralidae
- Genus: Ematheudes
- Species: E. setigera

Binomial name
- Ematheudes setigera J.C. Shaffer, 1998

Species of moth

Ematheudes setigera is a species of snout moth in the genus Ematheudes. It was described by Jay C. Shaffer in 1998, and is known from South Africa.
