= Afroarctia =

Scientific classification
- Kingdom: Animalia
- Phylum: Arthropoda
- Class: Insecta
- Order: Lepidoptera
- Superfamily: Noctuoidea
- Family: Erebidae
- Subfamily: Arctiinae
- Subtribe: Spilosomina
- Genus: Afroarctia; Toulgoët, 1978

Type species
- Spilosoma sjostedti Aurivillius, 1899 [1900]

Genus of moths

Afroarctia is a genus of tiger moths in the family Erebidae. The genus was erected by Hervé de Toulgoët in 1978. The moths occur in the Afrotropics.

== Species ==
- Afroarctia bergeri Toulgoët, 1978
- Afroarctia dargei (Toulgoët, 1976)
- Afroarctia histrionica Toulgoët, 1978
- Afroarctia kenyana (Rothschild, 1933)
- Afroarctia mamfei Toulgoët, 1978
- Afroarctia nebulosa Toulgoët, 1980
- Afroarctia sjostedti (Aurivillius, 1899 [1900])
