= Rhipidarctia rubrovitta =

Scientific classification
- Domain: Eukaryota
- Kingdom: Animalia
- Phylum: Arthropoda
- Class: Insecta
- Order: Lepidoptera
- Superfamily: Noctuoidea
- Family: Erebidae
- Subfamily: Arctiinae
- Genus: Rhipidarctia
- Species: R. rubrovitta

Binomial name
- Rhipidarctia rubrovitta (Aurivillius, 1904)

Synonyms
- Metarctia rubrovitta Aurivillius, 1904

Species of moth

Rhipidarctia rubrovitta is a moth in the family Erebidae. It was described by Per Olof Christopher Aurivillius in 1904 and is found in Angola, Cameroon and the Democratic Republic of the Congo.
