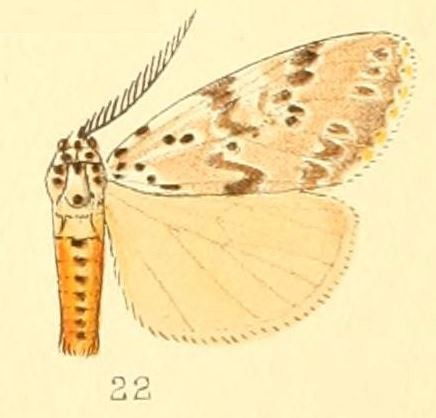
- Galtara extensa

Scientific classification
- Kingdom: Animalia
- Phylum: Arthropoda
- Clade: Pancrustacea
- Class: Insecta
- Order: Lepidoptera
- Superfamily: Noctuoidea
- Family: Erebidae
- Subfamily: Arctiinae
- Subtribe: Nyctemerina
- Genus: Galtara; Walker, 1863

Type species
- Galtara purata Walker, 1863

Synonyms
- Pseudocallimorpha Oberthür, 1879

= Galtara =

Genus of moths

Galtara is a genus of tiger moths in the family Erebidae. The genus was erected by Francis Walker in 1863.

== Species ==
- Galtara aurivilii (Pagenstecher, 1901)
- Galtara colettae Toulgoët, 1976
- Galtara convergens Toulgoët, 1979
- Galtara doriae (Oberthür, 1880)
- Galtara elongata (Swinhoe, 1907)
- Galtara extensa (Butler, 1880)
- Galtara laportei Toulgoët, 1979
- Galtara nepheloptera (Hampson, 1910)
- Galtara notabilis Toulgoët, 1980
- Galtara pulverata (Hampson, 1900)
- Galtara purata Walker, 1863
- Galtara reticulata (Hampson, 1909)
- Galtara rostrata Wallengren, 1860
- Galtara somaliensis (Hampson, 1916)
- Galtara turlini Toulgoët, 1979
