= Soloe trigutta =

Scientific classification
- Kingdom: Animalia
- Phylum: Arthropoda
- Class: Insecta
- Order: Lepidoptera
- Superfamily: Noctuoidea
- Family: Erebidae
- Genus: Soloe
- Species: S. trigutta

Binomial name
- Soloe trigutta Walker, 1854

Species of moth

Soloe trigutta is a moth in the family Erebidae. It is found in Sierra Leone and Zaire.
