= Ematheudes rhodochroa =

Scientific classification
- Kingdom: Animalia
- Phylum: Arthropoda
- Class: Insecta
- Order: Lepidoptera
- Family: Pyralidae
- Genus: Ematheudes
- Species: E. rhodochroa

Binomial name
- Ematheudes rhodochroa Hampson, 1918

Synonyms
- Patna venatella Hampson, 1918; Critonia sarcoida Hampson, 1918; Patna aulacodes Meyrick, 1933; Patna brunneicostella Hampson, 1918; Ematheudes aulacodes Meyrick, 1933

Species of moth

Ematheudes rhodochroa is a species of snout moth in the genus Ematheudes. It was described by George Hampson in 1918 and is known from the Democratic Republic of the Congo, Kenya, and South Africa.

== Taxonomy ==
Pyralidae (family)

Phycitinae (subfamily)/ Anerastiini (tribe)/ Ematheudes (genus)/
