= Rhipidarctia rhodosoma =

Scientific classification
- Kingdom: Animalia
- Phylum: Arthropoda
- Class: Insecta
- Order: Lepidoptera
- Superfamily: Noctuoidea
- Family: Erebidae
- Subfamily: Arctiinae
- Genus: Rhipidarctia
- Species: R. rhodosoma

Binomial name
- Rhipidarctia rhodosoma Kiriakoff, 1957

Species of moth

Rhipidarctia rhodosoma is a moth in the family Erebidae. It was described by Sergius G. Kiriakoff in 1957. It is found in the Democratic Republic of the Congo.
