= Galtara purata =

Scientific classification
- Kingdom: Animalia
- Phylum: Arthropoda
- Class: Insecta
- Order: Lepidoptera
- Superfamily: Noctuoidea
- Family: Erebidae
- Subfamily: Arctiinae
- Genus: Galtara
- Species: G. purata

Binomial name
- Galtara purata Walker, 1863

Synonyms
- Anthora basifurca Walker, 1865

Species of moth

Galtara purata is a moth of the subfamily Arctiinae. It was described by Francis Walker in 1863. It is found in South Africa.
