= Radiarctia screabile =

Scientific classification
- Kingdom: Animalia
- Phylum: Arthropoda
- Class: Insecta
- Order: Lepidoptera
- Superfamily: Noctuoidea
- Family: Erebidae
- Subfamily: Arctiinae
- Genus: Radiarctia
- Species: R. screabile

Binomial name
- Radiarctia screabile (Wallengren, 1875)

Synonyms
- Spilosoma screabile Wallengren, 1875; Spilosoma screabilis Hampson, 1920

Species of moth

Radiarctia screabile is a moth in the family Erebidae. It was described by Wallengren in 1875. It is found in Angola, the Democratic Republic of Congo, Kenya, Malawi, South Africa, Sudan, Tanzania, Zambia and Zimbabwe.

== Subspecies ==
- Radiarctia screabile screabile
- Radiarctia screabile nyangana Haynes, 2011 (Zimbabwe)
