= Radiarctia sinefascia =

Scientific classification
- Kingdom: Animalia
- Phylum: Arthropoda
- Class: Insecta
- Order: Lepidoptera
- Superfamily: Noctuoidea
- Family: Erebidae
- Subfamily: Arctiinae
- Genus: Radiarctia
- Species: R. sinefascia

Binomial name
- Radiarctia sinefascia (Hampson, 1916)

Synonyms
- Diacrisia sinefascia Hampson, 1916; Spilosoma sinefascia

Species of moth

Radiarctia sinefascia is a moth in the family Erebidae. It was described by George Hampson in 1916. It is found in Nigeria and Zimbabwe.
