= Afroarctia mamfei =

Scientific classification
- Kingdom: Animalia
- Phylum: Arthropoda
- Class: Insecta
- Order: Lepidoptera
- Superfamily: Noctuoidea
- Family: Erebidae
- Subfamily: Arctiinae
- Genus: Afroarctia
- Species: A. mamfei

Binomial name
- Afroarctia mamfei Toulgoët, 1978

Species of moth

Afroarctia mamfei is a moth of the family Erebidae. It was described by Hervé de Toulgoët in 1978. It is found in Cameroon.
