= Afroarctia dargei =

Scientific classification
- Kingdom: Animalia
- Phylum: Arthropoda
- Class: Insecta
- Order: Lepidoptera
- Superfamily: Noctuoidea
- Family: Erebidae
- Subfamily: Arctiinae
- Genus: Afroarctia
- Species: A. dargei

Binomial name
- Afroarctia dargei (Toulgoët, 1976)

Synonyms
- Pericallia dargei Toulgoët, 1976

Species of moth

Afroarctia dargei is a moth of the family Erebidae. It was described by Hervé de Toulgoët in 1976. It is found in Cameroon.
