= Angustalius besucheti =

Scientific classification
- Kingdom: Animalia
- Phylum: Arthropoda
- Clade: Pancrustacea
- Class: Insecta
- Order: Lepidoptera
- Family: Crambidae
- Subfamily: Crambinae
- Tribe: Crambini
- Genus: Angustalius
- Species: A. besucheti

Binomial name
- Angustalius besucheti (Błeszyński, 1963)

Synonyms
- Bleszynskia besucheti Błeszyński, 1963

Species of moth

Angustalius besucheti is a moth in the family Crambidae. It was described by Stanisław Błeszyński in 1963. It is found in Democratic Republic of the Congo.
