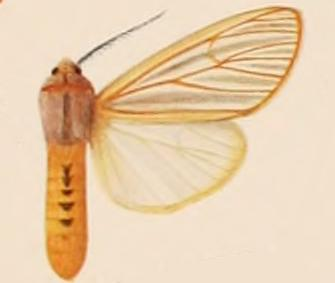

Scientific classification
- Domain: Eukaryota
- Kingdom: Animalia
- Phylum: Arthropoda
- Class: Insecta
- Order: Lepidoptera
- Superfamily: Noctuoidea
- Family: Erebidae
- Subfamily: Arctiinae
- Genus: Radiarctia
- Species: R. jacksoni

Binomial name
- Radiarctia jacksoni (Rothschild, 1910)

Synonyms
- Diacrisia jacksoni Rothschild, 1910; Spilosoma jacksoni

= Radiarctia jacksoni =

Species of moth

Radiarctia jacksoni is a moth of the family Erebidae first described by Walter Rothschild in 1910. It is found in Ethiopia, Kenya, Zaire and Tanzania.

The larvae feed on Commelina, Aster, Bidens pilosa, Galimsoga parviflora, Zinnia, Boerhavia and Solanum.
