= Hapsifera =

Scientific classification
- Kingdom: Animalia
- Phylum: Arthropoda
- Clade: Pancrustacea
- Class: Insecta
- Order: Lepidoptera
- Family: Tineidae
- Subfamily: Hapsiferinae
- Genus: Hapsifera; Zeller, 1847

Type species
- Hapsifera luridella Zeller, 1847

Genus of moths

Hapsifera is a genus of moths belonging to the family Tineidae.

To this species of this genus belong: African species:

- Hapsifera clara Meyrick, 1934
- Hapsifera cristinae Căpuşe, 1971
- Hapsifera equatorialis Gozmány, 1967
- Hapsifera euschema Gozmány, 2004
- Hapsifera glebata Meyrick, 1908
- Hapsifera gozmanyi Gaedike, 2014
- Hapsifera gypsophaea Gozmány, 1965
- Hapsifera haplotherma Meyrick, 1934
- Hapsifera hastata Gozmány, 1969
- Hapsifera hilaris Gozamny, 1965
- Hapsifera ignobilisMeyrick, 1919
- Hapsifera kerbelella Amsel, 1949
- Hapsifera lecithala Gozmány & Vári, 1973
- Hapsifera lithocentra Meyrick, 1920
- Hapsifera luridella Zeller, 1847
- Hapsifera lutea Gozmány, 1967
- Hapsifera luteata Gozmány, 1965
- Hapsifera marmarota Meyrick, 1914
- Hapsifera meliceris Meyrick, 1908
- Hapsifera nidicola Meyrick, 1935
- Hapsifera nigraureella Viette, 1968
- Hapsifera niphoxantha Gozmány, 1965
- Hapsifera ochroptila Meyrick, 1908
- Hapsifera pachypsaltis Gozmány, 1965
- Hapsifera paraglareosa Gozmány, 1968
- Hapsifera pardalea Meyrick, 1908d
- Hapsifera punctata Petersen, 1961
- Hapsifera refalcata Gozmány, 1967
- Hapsifera revoluta Meyrick, 1914
- Hapsifera rhodoptila Meyrick, 1920
- Hapsifera richteri Gozmány, 1965
- Hapsifera septica Meyrick, 1908

Palearctic species:

- Hapsifera luridella Zeller, 1847
- Hapsifera eburnea Butler
- Hapsifera punctata Petersen, 1961
- Hapsifera maculata Walsingham
- Hapsifera multiguttella Ragonoet
- Hapsifera barbata Chr.
