= Soloe sexmaculata =

Scientific classification
- Domain: Eukaryota
- Kingdom: Animalia
- Phylum: Arthropoda
- Class: Insecta
- Order: Lepidoptera
- Superfamily: Noctuoidea
- Family: Erebidae
- Genus: Soloe
- Species: S. sexmaculata

Binomial name
- Soloe sexmaculata Plötz, 1880

Species of moth

Soloe sexmaculata is a moth in the family Erebidae. It is found in western Africa.
