= Rhipidarctia =

Scientific classification
- Domain: Eukaryota
- Kingdom: Animalia
- Phylum: Arthropoda
- Class: Insecta
- Order: Lepidoptera
- Superfamily: Noctuoidea
- Family: Erebidae
- Subfamily: Arctiinae
- Tribe: Syntomini
- Genus: Rhipidarctia; Kiriakoff, 1953

Synonyms
- Elsa Kiriakoff, 1953; Elsita Kiriakoff, 1954; Takwa Kiriakoff, 1957

Genus of moths

Rhipidarctia is a genus of moths in the family Erebidae.

== Species ==
- Rhipidarctia aurora Kiriakoff, 1957
- Rhipidarctia cinctella (Kiriakoff, 1953)
- Rhipidarctia conradti (Oberthür, 1911)
- Rhipidarctia crameri Kiriakoff, 1961
- Rhipidarctia flaviceps (Hampson, 1898)
- Rhipidarctia forsteri (Kiriakoff, 1953)
- Rhipidarctia invaria (Walker, 1856)
- Rhipidarctia lutea (Holland, 1893)
- Rhipidarctia miniata Kiriakoff, 1957
- Rhipidarctia pareclecta (Holland, 1893)
- Rhipidarctia postrosea (Rothschild, 1913)
- Rhipidarctia rhodosoma Kiriakoff, 1957
- Rhipidarctia rubrovitta (Aurivillius, 1904)
- Rhipidarctia saturata Kiriakoff, 1957
- Rhipidarctia silacea (Plötz, 1880)
- Rhipidarctia subminiata Kiriakoff, 1959
- Rhipidarctia xenops (Kiriakoff, 1957)

== Former species ==
- Rhipidarctia syntomia (Plötz, 1880)
