= Macropoliana asirensis =

Scientific classification
- Kingdom: Animalia
- Phylum: Arthropoda
- Class: Insecta
- Order: Lepidoptera
- Family: Sphingidae
- Genus: Macropoliana
- Species: M. asirensis

Binomial name
- Macropoliana asirensis Wiltshire, 1980

Species of moth

Macropoliana asirensis is a moth of the family Sphingidae. It is known from Saudi Arabia and Yemen.
