= Rhipidarctia miniata =

Scientific classification
- Kingdom: Animalia
- Phylum: Arthropoda
- Class: Insecta
- Order: Lepidoptera
- Superfamily: Noctuoidea
- Family: Erebidae
- Subfamily: Arctiinae
- Genus: Rhipidarctia
- Species: R. miniata

Binomial name
- Rhipidarctia miniata Kiriakoff, 1957

Species of moth

Rhipidarctia miniata is a moth in the family Erebidae. It was described by Sergius G. Kiriakoff in 1957 and is found in Cameroon.
