= Ematheudes nigropunctata =

Scientific classification
- Domain: Eukaryota
- Kingdom: Animalia
- Phylum: Arthropoda
- Class: Insecta
- Order: Lepidoptera
- Family: Pyralidae
- Genus: Ematheudes
- Species: E. nigropunctata

Binomial name
- Ematheudes nigropunctata (Legrand, 1966)

Synonyms
- Anerastia nigropunctata Legrand, 1966

Species of moth

Ematheudes nigropunctata is a species of snout moth in the genus Ematheudes. It was described by Henry Legrand in 1966, and is known from the Seychelles and from the highlands of Madagascar.

This species has a wing radius of 7–8 mm, the palpus of the male has a length of 2.8 mm. The eye diameter is 0.6–0.7 mm. The forewings are pale orange yellow with dark brown near costa at the base, veins with white markings. The hindwings are nearly uniformly yellowish white.
