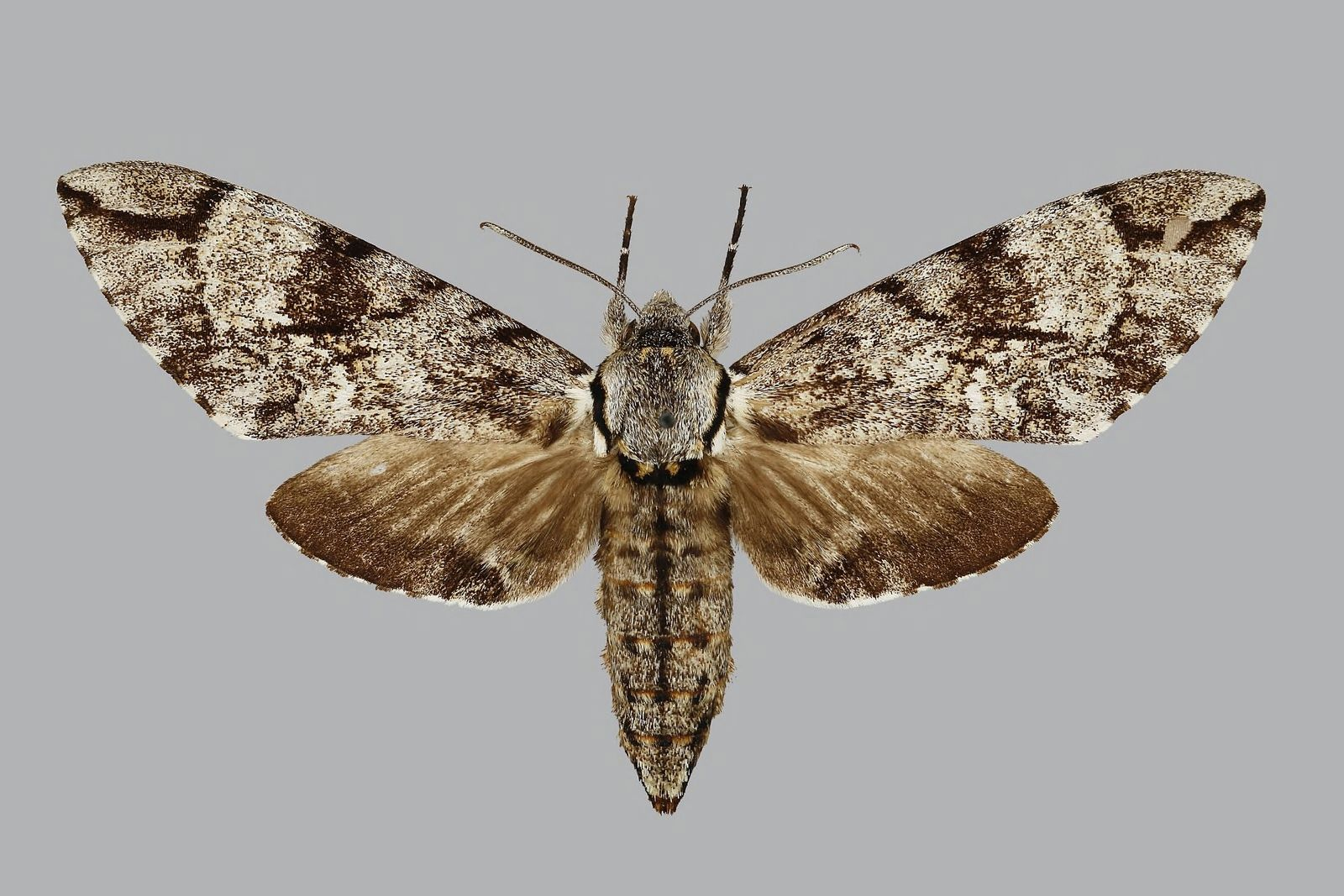
- Female

Scientific classification
- Domain: Eukaryota
- Kingdom: Animalia
- Phylum: Arthropoda
- Class: Insecta
- Order: Lepidoptera
- Family: Sphingidae
- Genus: Macropoliana
- Species: M. gessi

Binomial name
- Macropoliana gessi Schmit, 2006

= Macropoliana gessi =

Species of moth

Macropoliana gessi is a moth of the family Sphingidae which is endemic to South Africa.
