= Galtara nepheloptera =

Scientific classification
- Kingdom: Animalia
- Phylum: Arthropoda
- Class: Insecta
- Order: Lepidoptera
- Superfamily: Noctuoidea
- Family: Erebidae
- Subfamily: Arctiinae
- Genus: Galtara
- Species: G. nepheloptera

Binomial name
- Galtara nepheloptera (Hampson, 1910)

Synonyms
- Digama nepheloptera Hampson, 1910

Species of moth

Galtara nepheloptera is a moth of the subfamily Arctiinae. It was described by George Hampson in 1910. It is found in Angola, Namibia and South Africa.
