= Rhipidarctia postrosea =

Scientific classification
- Domain: Eukaryota
- Kingdom: Animalia
- Phylum: Arthropoda
- Class: Insecta
- Order: Lepidoptera
- Superfamily: Noctuoidea
- Family: Erebidae
- Subfamily: Arctiinae
- Genus: Rhipidarctia
- Species: R. postrosea

Binomial name
- Rhipidarctia postrosea (Rothschild, 1913)

Synonyms
- Metarctia postrosea Rothschild, 1913; Rhipidarctia (Hemirhipidia) danieli Kiriakoff, 1955; Rhipidarctia danieli

Species of moth

Rhipidarctia postrosea is a moth in the family Erebidae. It was described by Walter Rothschild in 1913. It is found in Cameroon, the Democratic Republic of the Congo, Ghana and Nigeria.
