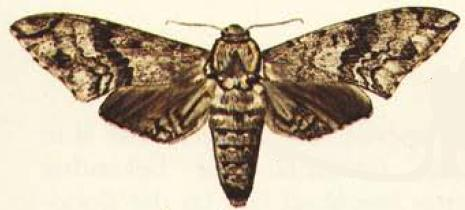
- Macropoliana natalensis

Scientific classification
- Domain: Eukaryota
- Kingdom: Animalia
- Phylum: Arthropoda
- Class: Insecta
- Order: Lepidoptera
- Family: Sphingidae
- Tribe: Sphingini
- Genus: Macropoliana; Carcasson, 1968

= Macropoliana =

Genus of moths

Macropoliana is a genus of moths in the family Sphingidae. The genus was erected by Robert Herbert Carcasson in 1968. It is found in Central and Southern Africa.

== Species ==
- Macropoliana afarorum Rougeot 1975
- Macropoliana asirensis Wiltshire 1980
- Macropoliana cadioui Haxaire & Camiade, 2008
- Macropoliana ferax (Rothschild & Jordan 1916)
- Macropoliana gessi Schmit, 2006
- Macropoliana natalensis (Butler 1875)
- Macropoliana scheveni Carcasson 1972
