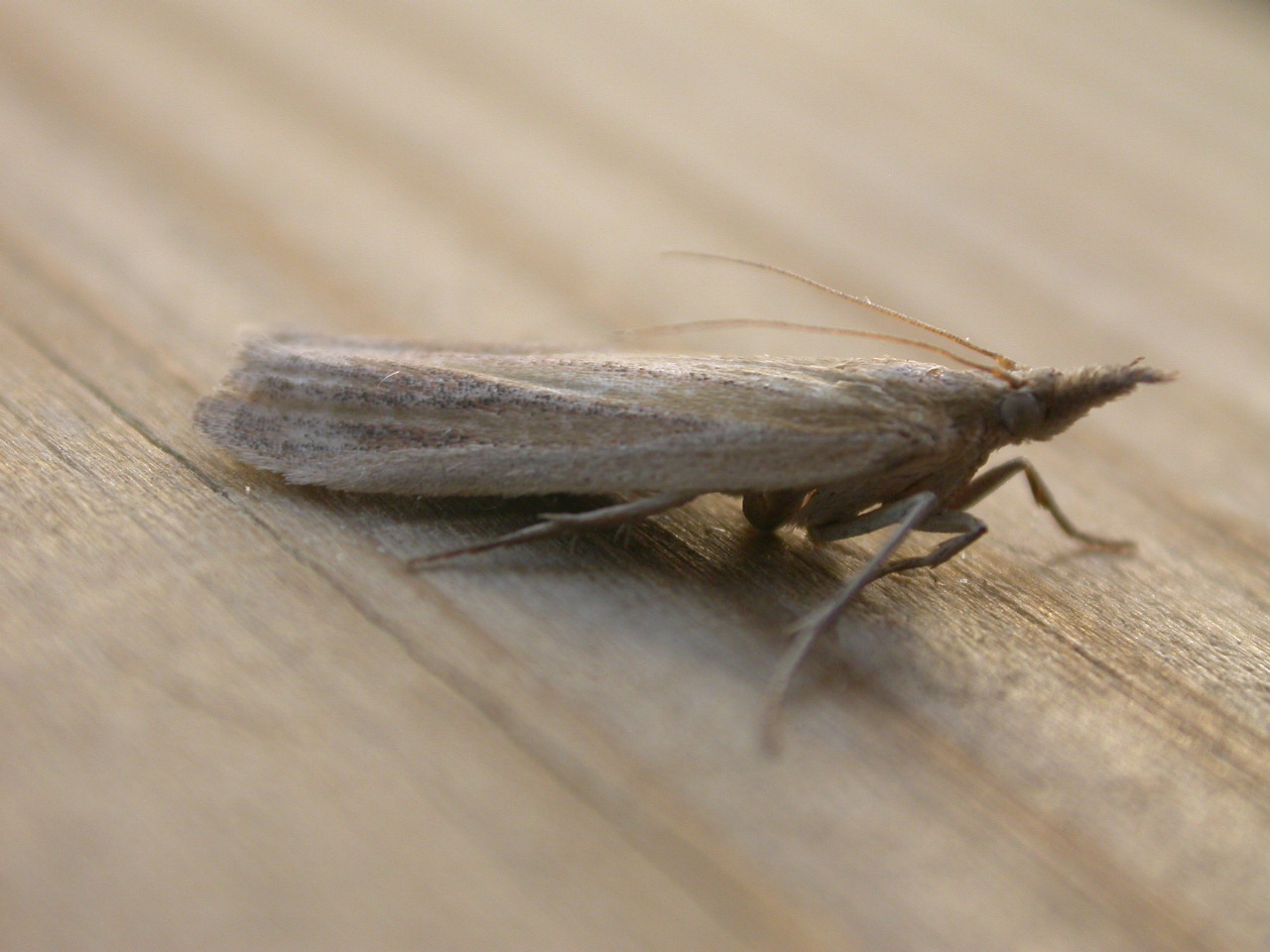

Scientific classification
- Kingdom: Animalia
- Phylum: Arthropoda
- Clade: Pancrustacea
- Class: Insecta
- Order: Lepidoptera
- Family: Pyralidae
- Genus: Ematheudes
- Species: E. punctella

Binomial name
- Ematheudes punctella (Treitschke, 1833)

Synonyms
- Chilo punctellus Treitschke, 1833; Ematheudes punctellus

= Ematheudes punctella =

Species of moth

Ematheudes punctella is a moth of the family Pyralidae described by Georg Friedrich Treitschke in 1833. It is found in southern and central Europe, Turkey and probably further east.
