= Ematheudes vitellinella =

Scientific classification
- Kingdom: Animalia
- Phylum: Arthropoda
- Class: Insecta
- Order: Lepidoptera
- Family: Pyralidae
- Genus: Ematheudes
- Species: E. vitellinella

Binomial name
- Ematheudes vitellinella Ragonot, 1887

Species of moth

Ematheudes vitellinella is a species of snout moth in the genus Ematheudes. It was described by Émile Louis Ragonot in 1887, and is known from Asia Minor and Georgia.

The wingspan is about 24 mm.
