= Rhipidarctia lutea =

Scientific classification
- Domain: Eukaryota
- Kingdom: Animalia
- Phylum: Arthropoda
- Class: Insecta
- Order: Lepidoptera
- Superfamily: Noctuoidea
- Family: Erebidae
- Subfamily: Arctiinae
- Genus: Rhipidarctia
- Species: R. lutea

Binomial name
- Rhipidarctia lutea (Holland, 1893)

Synonyms
- Metarctia lutea Holland, 1893; Elsa invaria ghesquierei Kiriakoff, 1953

Species of moth

Rhipidarctia lutea is a moth in the family Erebidae. It was described by William Jacob Holland in 1893. It is found in the Democratic Republic of the Congo and Gabon.

Rhipidarctia lutea has 0 observations.
