= Cubitofusa =

Scientific classification
- Kingdom: Animalia
- Phylum: Arthropoda
- Clade: Pancrustacea
- Class: Insecta
- Order: Lepidoptera
- Family: Tineidae
- Subfamily: Hapsiferinae
- Genus: Cubitofusa; Gozmány & Vári, 1973

Genus of moths

Cubitofusa is a genus of moths belonging to the family Tineidae.

== Species ==
- Cubitofusa pseudoglebata (Gozmány, 1967) (from Congo, Rwanda)
- Cubitofusa seydeli (Gozmány, 1967) (from Congo)
