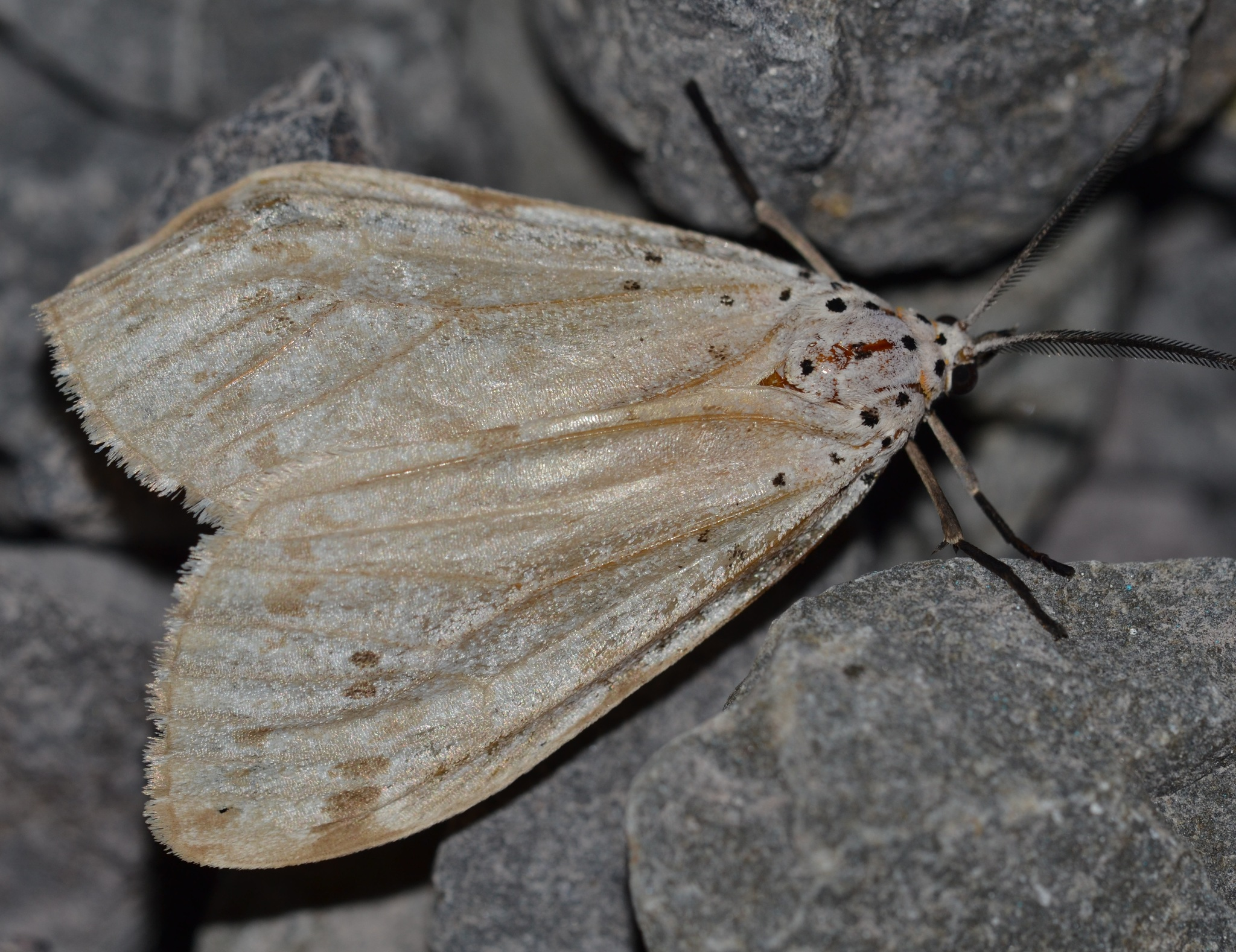
- Adult
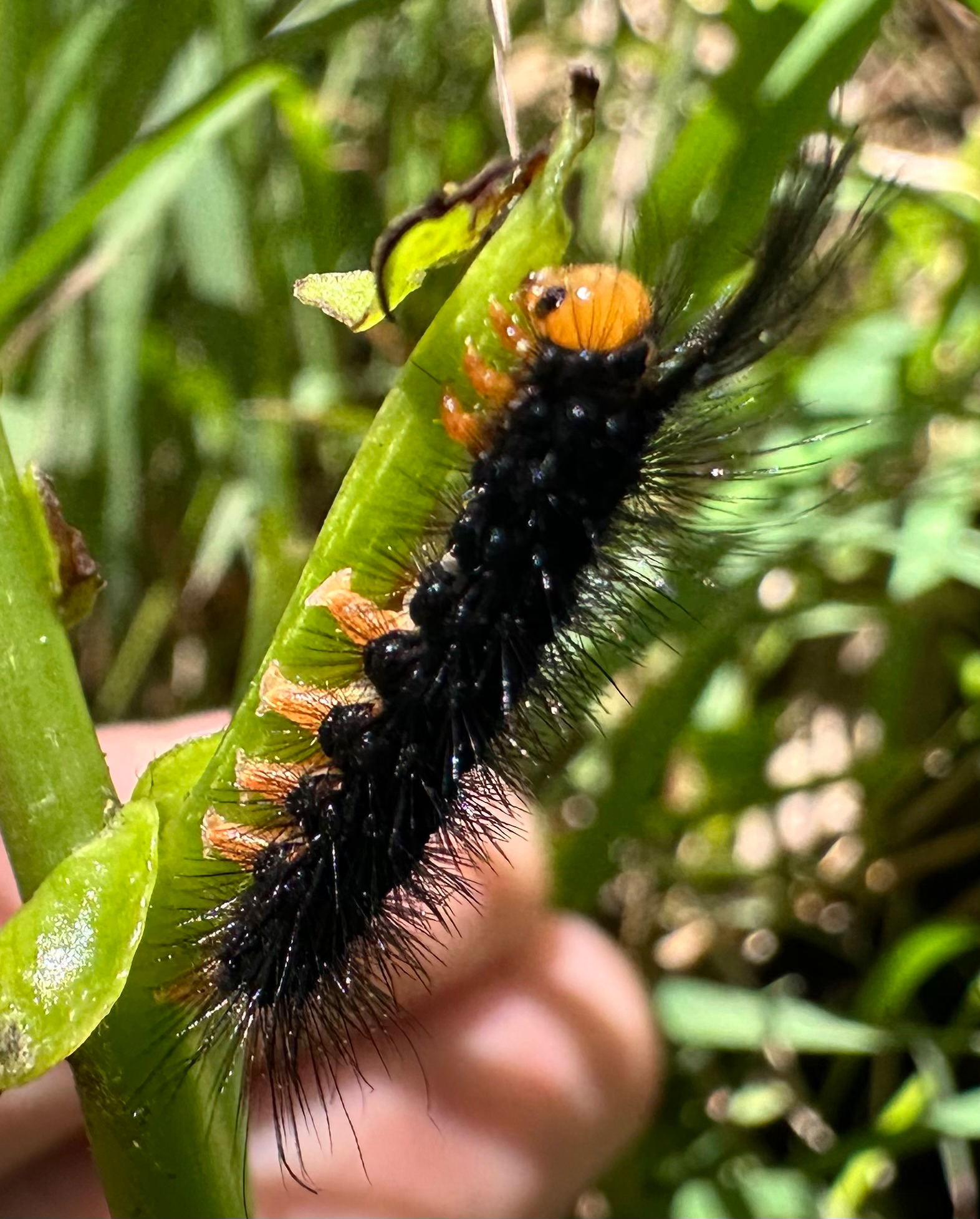
- Larva

Scientific classification
- Kingdom: Animalia
- Phylum: Arthropoda
- Class: Insecta
- Order: Lepidoptera
- Superfamily: Noctuoidea
- Family: Erebidae
- Subfamily: Arctiinae
- Genus: Galtara
- Species: G. extensa

Binomial name
- Galtara extensa (Butler, 1880)

Synonyms
- Sommeria extensa Butler, 1880; Secusio extensa

= Galtara extensa =

Species of moth

Galtara extensa is a moth of the subfamily Arctiinae first described by Arthur Gardiner Butler in 1880. It is found on the Comoros and in Madagascar.

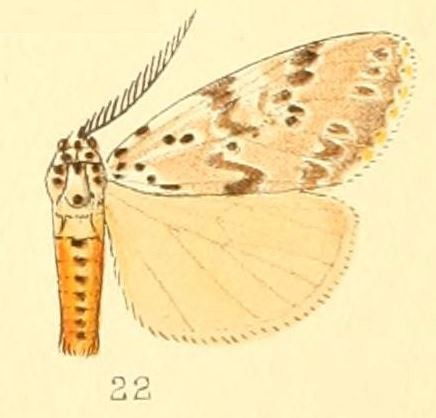
Illustration

== Biology ==
The eggs of this species have a diameter of 0.8 mm and are 0.75 mm in height (dome shaped). They are of cream to white colour when deposited and turn black on the day before hatching. They are laid singly or in batches on the underside of leaves. The duration of eggs is 5–6 days. The larvae feed at night. Their head is smooth and their body is covered with dark, plumose setae (feathery hairs). At maturity they reach a size of 26.4 mm. Pupae is about half the length of the larvae, and the pupal stage is 11–12 days.

Adults of this moth are mostly of mottled shades of grey with white and with black spotting on the forewings. The whole life span of this moths is about 41 days, producing up to nine generation in a year under laboratory conditions.

The larvae of this moths feed on fireweed (Senecio madagascariensis an Asteraceae), a plant also native to Madagascar that has been introduced to Australia and Hawaii, where it has become an invasive pest.

To a lesser extent they also feed on Delairea odorata, Senecio vulgaris, Crassocephalum crepidioides, Emilia fosbergii, Erechtites hieracifolia and Helianthus annuus (sunflowers).

== Biological control ==
In December 2012 the United States Department of Agriculture approved the release of Galtara extensa in Hawaii to combat the spread of fireweed.
