= Popoudina brosi =

Scientific classification
- Kingdom: Animalia
- Phylum: Arthropoda
- Class: Insecta
- Order: Lepidoptera
- Superfamily: Noctuoidea
- Family: Erebidae
- Subfamily: Arctiinae
- Genus: Popoudina
- Species: P. brosi

Binomial name
- Popoudina brosi (Toulgoët, 1986)

Synonyms
- Estigmene brosi Toulgoët, 1986

Species of moth

Popoudina brosi is a moth of the family Erebidae. It was described by Hervé de Toulgoët in 1986. It is found in Tanzania.
