= Rhipidarctia pareclecta =

Scientific classification
- Domain: Eukaryota
- Kingdom: Animalia
- Phylum: Arthropoda
- Class: Insecta
- Order: Lepidoptera
- Superfamily: Noctuoidea
- Family: Erebidae
- Subfamily: Arctiinae
- Genus: Rhipidarctia
- Species: R. pareclecta

Binomial name
- Rhipidarctia pareclecta (Holland, 1893)

Synonyms
- Metarctia pareclecta Holland, 1893; Metarctia rosacea Bethune-Baker, 1911

Species of moth

Rhipidarctia pareclecta is a moth in the family Erebidae. It was described by William Jacob Holland in 1893. It is found in Angola, Gabon, Kenya and Uganda.
