= Ematheudes varicella =

Scientific classification
- Domain: Eukaryota
- Kingdom: Animalia
- Phylum: Arthropoda
- Class: Insecta
- Order: Lepidoptera
- Family: Pyralidae
- Genus: Ematheudes
- Species: E. varicella

Binomial name
- Ematheudes varicella Ragonot, 1887

Species of moth

Ematheudes varicella is a species of snout moth in the genus Ematheudes. It was described by Émile Louis Ragonot in 1887, and is known from Armenia and Turkistan.
