= Hapsiferona =

Scientific classification
- Kingdom: Animalia
- Phylum: Arthropoda
- Clade: Pancrustacea
- Class: Insecta
- Order: Lepidoptera
- Family: Tineidae
- Subfamily: Hapsiferinae
- Genus: Hapsiferona; Gozmány, 1967

Type species
- Hapsifera glareosa Meyrick, 1912

Genus of moths

Hapsiferona is a genus of moths belonging to the family Tineidae.

== Species ==
Some species of this genus are:

- Hapsiferona arabica Gaedike, 2009
- Hapsiferona glareosa (Meyrick, 1912)
- Hapsiferona jemenitica Gaedike, 2014
- Hapsiferona remanei Gaedike, 2014
