= Rhipidarctia conradti =

Scientific classification
- Domain: Eukaryota
- Kingdom: Animalia
- Phylum: Arthropoda
- Class: Insecta
- Order: Lepidoptera
- Superfamily: Noctuoidea
- Family: Erebidae
- Subfamily: Arctiinae
- Genus: Rhipidarctia
- Species: R. conradti

Binomial name
- Rhipidarctia conradti (Oberthür, 1911)

Synonyms
- Pseudapiconoma conradti Oberthür, 1911; Rhipidarctia rhodospila Kiriakoff, 1957

Species of moth

Rhipidarctia conradti is a moth in the family Erebidae. It was described by Oberthür in 1911. It is found in Cameroon, the Democratic Republic of Congo, Ivory Coast and Nigeria.
