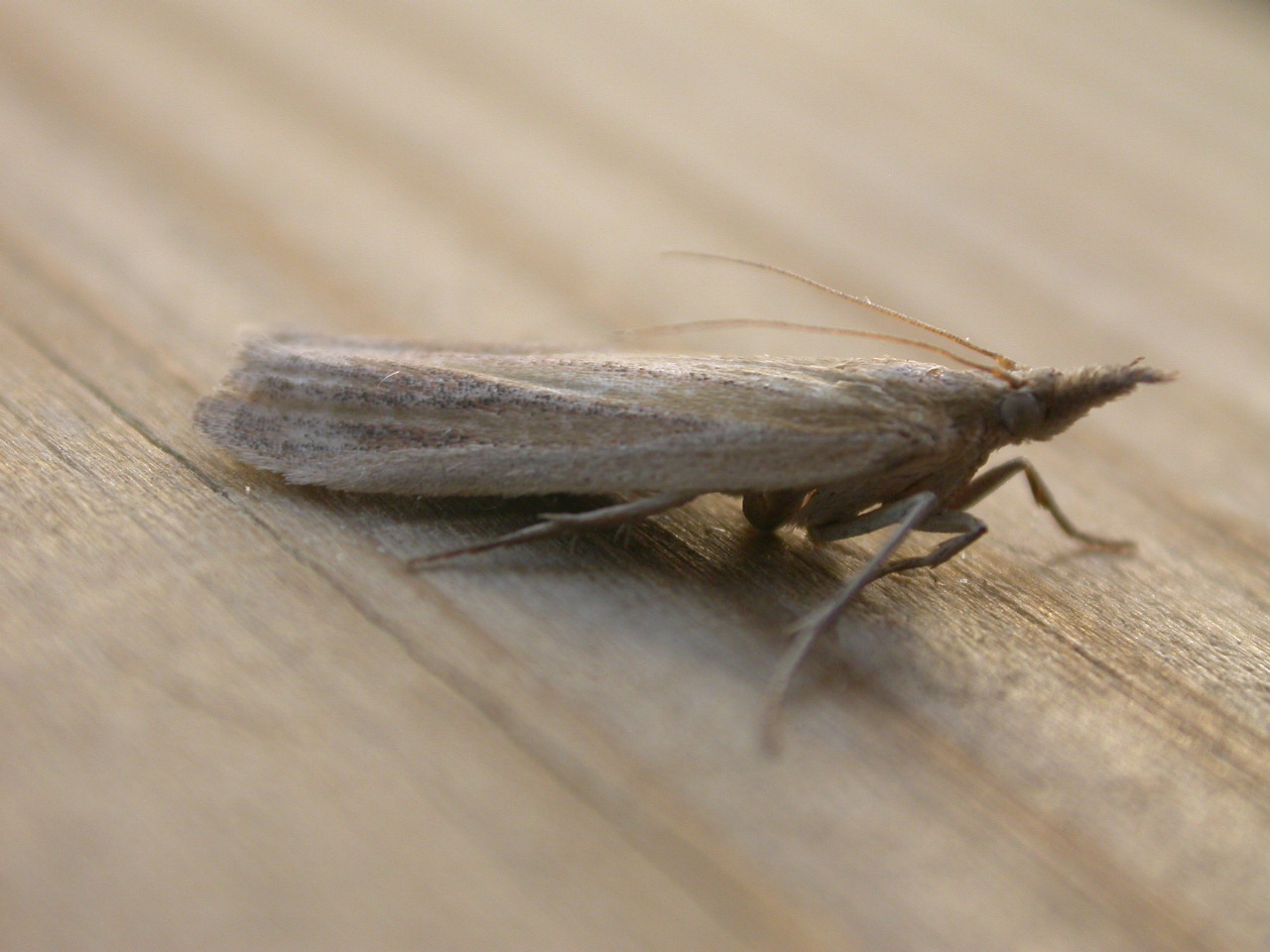
- Ematheudes punctella

Scientific classification
- Kingdom: Animalia
- Phylum: Arthropoda
- Clade: Pancrustacea
- Class: Insecta
- Order: Lepidoptera
- Family: Pyralidae
- Tribe: Anerastiini
- Genus: Ematheudes; Zeller, 1867

Synonyms
- Proavitheudes Amsel, 1961

= Ematheudes =

Genus of moths

Ematheudes is a genus of snout moths. It was described by Philipp Christoph Zeller in 1867 and is known from Zimbabwe, South Africa, the Democratic Republic of the Congo, Zambia, Namibia, Kenya, Sierra Leone, Seychelles, Iran, Ethiopia, Syria, Hungary, Italy, Angola, Togo and Tunisia.

== Species ==
- Ematheudes convexus J. C. Shaffer, 1998
- Ematheudes crassinotella Ragonot, 1888
- Ematheudes crenulatus J. C. Shaffer, 1998
- Ematheudes dewittei J. C. Shaffer, 1998
- Ematheudes elysium J. C. Shaffer, 1998
- Ematheudes erectus J. C. Shaffer, 1998
- Ematheudes forficatus J. C. Shaffer, 1998
- Ematheudes hamatus J. C. Shaffer, 1998
- Ematheudes hispidus J. C. Shaffer, 1998
- Ematheudes kenyaensis J. C. Shaffer, 1998
- Ematheudes lusingensis J. C. Shaffer, 1998
- Ematheudes maculescens J. C. Shaffer, 1998
- Ematheudes megacantha J. C. Shaffer, 1998
- Ematheudes michaelshafferi J. C. Shaffer, 1998
- Ematheudes miosticta (Hampson, 1918)
- Ematheudes natalensis J. C. Shaffer, 1998
- Ematheudes neonepsia J. C. Shaffer, 1998
- Ematheudes neurias (Hampson, 1918)
- Ematheudes nigropunctata (Legrand, 1966)
- Ematheudes paleatella Ragonot, 1888
- Ematheudes persicella (Amsel, 1961)
- Ematheudes pollex J. C. Shaffer, 1998
- Ematheudes pseudopunctella Ragonot, 1888
- Ematheudes punctella (Treitschke, 1833)
- Ematheudes quintuplex J. C. Shaffer, 1998
- Ematheudes rhizolineata (Bradley, 1980)
- Ematheudes rhodochroa (Hampson, 1918)
- Ematheudes setigera J. C. Shaffer, 1998
- Ematheudes sinuosus J. C. Shaffer, 1998
- Ematheudes straminella Snellen, 1872
- Ematheudes strictus J. C. Shaffer, 1998
- Ematheudes togoensis J. C. Shaffer, 1998
- Ematheudes toxalis J. C. Shaffer, 1998
- Ematheudes triangularus J. C. Shaffer, 1998
- Ematheudes trimaculosus J. C. Shaffer, 1998
- Ematheudes tunesiella Ragonot in Staudinger, 1892
- Ematheudes varicella Ragonot, 1887
- Ematheudes vitellinella Ragonot, 1887
