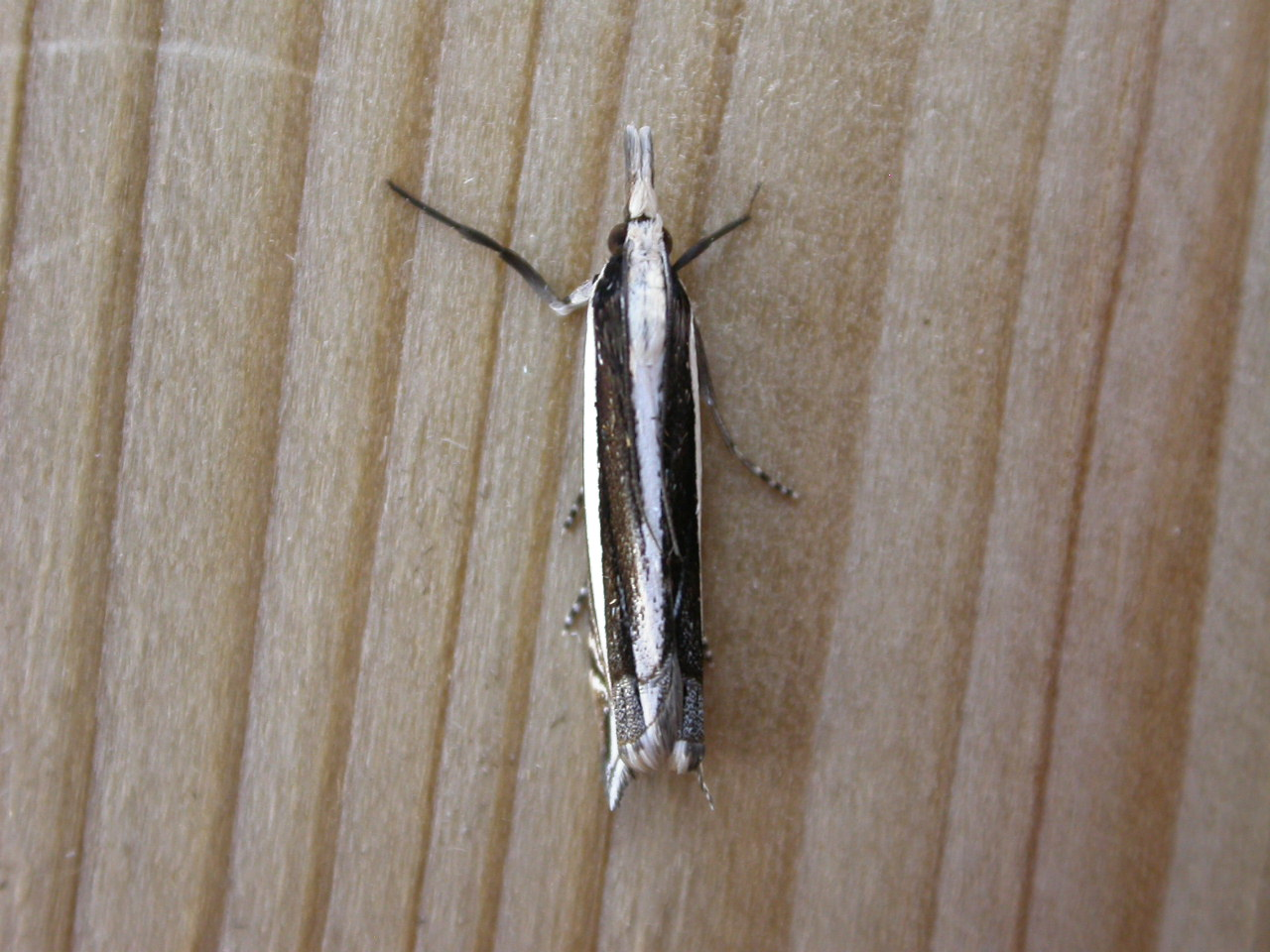

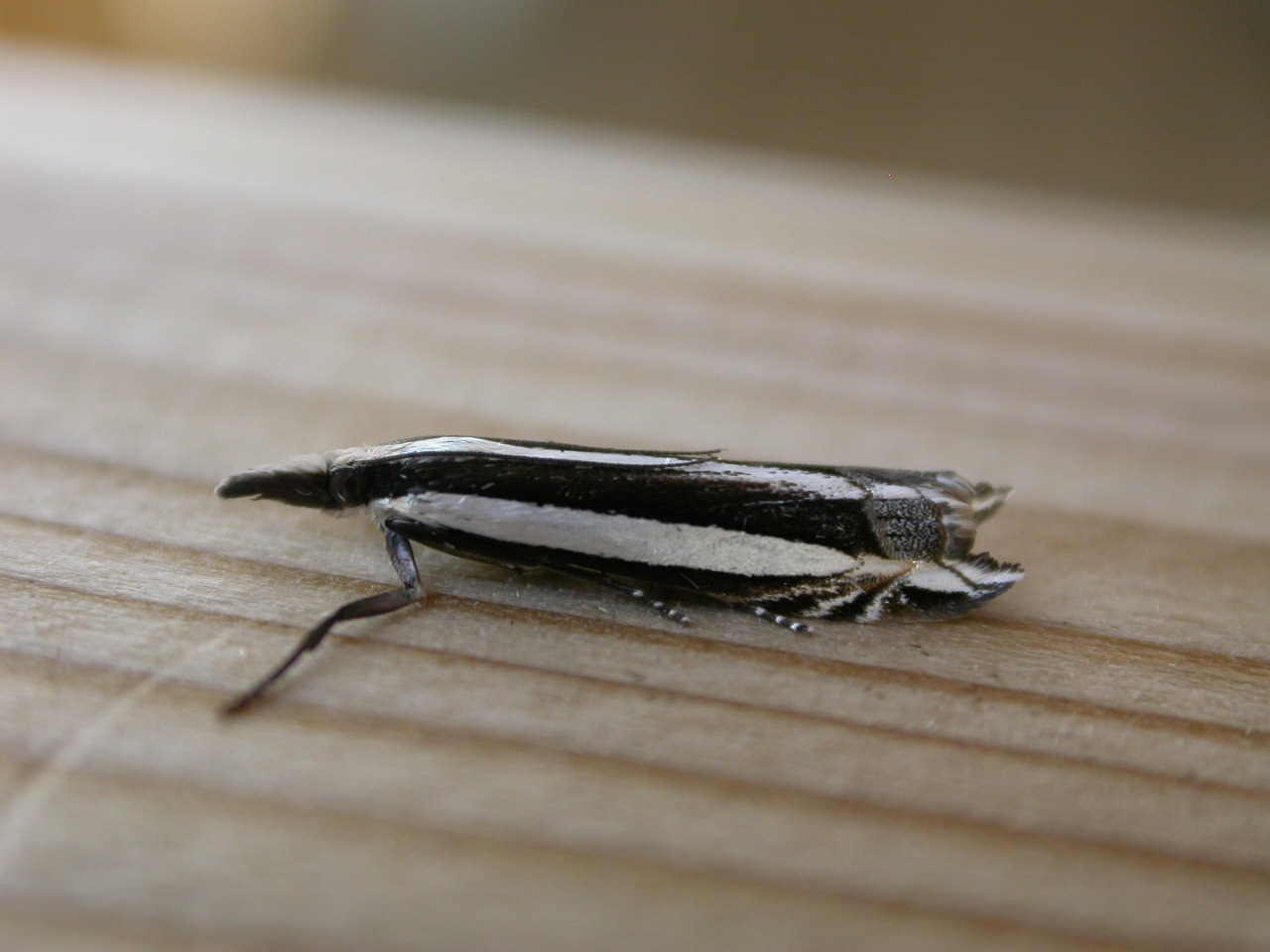

Scientific classification
- Kingdom: Animalia
- Phylum: Arthropoda
- Clade: Pancrustacea
- Class: Insecta
- Order: Lepidoptera
- Family: Crambidae
- Subfamily: Crambinae
- Tribe: Crambini
- Genus: Angustalius
- Species: A. malacellus

Binomial name
- Angustalius malacellus (Duponchel, 1836)

Synonyms
- Crambus malacellus Duponchel, 1836; Crambus hapaliscus Zeller, 1852; Crambus concinellus Walker, 1863; Crambus concinnellus Meyrick, 1879; Crambus conciunellus Turner, 1904

= Angustalius malacellus =

Species of moth

Angustalius malacellus is a moth of the Crambinae family. It is known from Spain, Portugal, France, Sardinia, Sicily, Italy, Greece and Crete. It has also been recorded from the Comoros, Rwanda, South Africa, Ethiopia, Madagascar, La Réunion, Mauritius and Fiji.

The larvae feed on grasses, but have been reported feeding on maize plants, causing severe damage.
