= Rhinophyllis =

Scientific classification
- Kingdom: Animalia
- Phylum: Arthropoda
- Clade: Pancrustacea
- Class: Insecta
- Order: Lepidoptera
- Family: Tineidae
- Genus: Rhinophyllis; Meyrick, 1936

Genus of moths

Rhinophyllis is a genus of moths belonging to the family Tineidae.

== Species ==
- Rhinophyllis dasychiras Meyrick, 1936 (from Bengal)
