= Scalidomia fetialis =

Scientific classification
- Kingdom: Animalia
- Phylum: Arthropoda
- Class: Insecta
- Order: Lepidoptera
- Family: Tineidae
- Genus: Cimitra
- Species: C. fetialis

Binomial name
- Cimitra fetialis (Meyrick, 1917)

Synonyms
- Hapsifera fetialis Meyrick, 1917; Cimitra fetialis

Species of moth

Scalidomia fetialis is a moth in the family Tineidae. It is found in West- and Central-Africa and on the Comoros.

This species has a wingspan of 14–16 mm. Its head is pale ochreous mixed with fuscous, the forewings are pale ochreous strigulated with fuscous and a basal patch and an oblique fasciae before the middle.
