= Rhipidarctia crameri =

Scientific classification
- Kingdom: Animalia
- Phylum: Arthropoda
- Clade: Pancrustacea
- Class: Insecta
- Order: Lepidoptera
- Superfamily: Noctuoidea
- Family: Erebidae
- Subfamily: Arctiinae
- Genus: Rhipidarctia
- Species: R. crameri

Binomial name
- Rhipidarctia crameri Kiriakoff, 1961

Species of moth

Rhipidarctia crameri is a moth in the family Erebidae. It was described by Sergius G. Kiriakoff in 1961. It is found in the Democratic Republic of the Congo, Kenya, Rwanda and Uganda.
