= Chrysocrata =

Scientific classification
- Kingdom: Animalia
- Phylum: Arthropoda
- Clade: Pancrustacea
- Class: Insecta
- Order: Lepidoptera
- Family: Tineidae
- Genus: Chrysocrata; Gozmány, 1969

Genus of moths

Chrysocrata is a genus of moths belonging to the family Tineidae that is found in Madagascar.

There is only one species in this genus: Chrysocrata coruscans Gozmány, 1969.
