= Galtara reticulata =

Scientific classification
- Kingdom: Animalia
- Phylum: Arthropoda
- Class: Insecta
- Order: Lepidoptera
- Superfamily: Noctuoidea
- Family: Erebidae
- Subfamily: Arctiinae
- Genus: Galtara
- Species: G. reticulata

Binomial name
- Galtara reticulata (Hampson, 1909)

Synonyms
- Diota reticulata Hampson, 1909

Species of moth

Galtara reticulata is a moth of the subfamily Arctiinae. It was described by George Hampson in 1909. It is found in the Democratic Republic of the Congo, Rwanda and Uganda.
