= Pyrausta flavimarginalis =

Scientific classification
- Kingdom: Animalia
- Phylum: Arthropoda
- Class: Insecta
- Order: Lepidoptera
- Family: Crambidae
- Genus: Pyrausta
- Species: P. flavimarginalis

Binomial name
- Pyrausta flavimarginalis (Hampson, 1913)

Synonyms
- Calamochrous flavimarginalis Hampson, 1913; Mecyna termoxantha Meyrick, 1933

Species of moth

Pyrausta flavimarginalis is a moth in the family Crambidae. It was described by George Hampson in 1913. It is found in the Democratic Republic of the Congo (North Kivu, Équateur), Kenya and Rwanda.
