= Phyllonorycter umukarus =

Scientific classification
- Domain: Eukaryota
- Kingdom: Animalia
- Phylum: Arthropoda
- Class: Insecta
- Order: Lepidoptera
- Family: Gracillariidae
- Genus: Phyllonorycter
- Species: P. umukarus

Binomial name
- Phyllonorycter umukarus de Prins, 2012

Species of moth

Phyllonorycter umukarus is a moth of the family Gracillariidae. It is found in south-western Rwanda in open clearings in montane wet forests at an altitude of about 1,800 meters.

The length of the forewings is 2.95–3.14 mm.
