= Galtara elongata =

Scientific classification
- Domain: Eukaryota
- Kingdom: Animalia
- Phylum: Arthropoda
- Class: Insecta
- Order: Lepidoptera
- Superfamily: Noctuoidea
- Family: Erebidae
- Subfamily: Arctiinae
- Genus: Galtara
- Species: G. elongata

Binomial name
- Galtara elongata (C. Swinhoe, 1907)

Synonyms
- Digama elongata C. Swinhoe, 1907

Species of moth

Galtara elongata is a moth of the subfamily Arctiinae. It was described by Charles Swinhoe in 1907. It is found in the Democratic Republic of the Congo, Ethiopia, Kenya and Rwanda.
