= Galtara aurivilii =

Scientific classification
- Kingdom: Animalia
- Phylum: Arthropoda
- Clade: Pancrustacea
- Class: Insecta
- Order: Lepidoptera
- Superfamily: Noctuoidea
- Family: Erebidae
- Subfamily: Arctiinae
- Genus: Galtara
- Species: G. aurivilii

Binomial name
- Galtara aurivilii (Pagenstecher, 1901)

Synonyms
- Nyctemeria aurivilii Pagenstecher, 1901; Galtara aurivillii – Swinhoe, 1903

Species of moth

Galtara aurivilii is a moth of the subfamily Arctiinae. It was described by Arnold Pagenstecher in 1901. It is found in Cameroon, Kenya, Malawi, Rwanda, Uganda and Zambia.
