= Radiarctia melanochoria =

Scientific classification
- Domain: Eukaryota
- Kingdom: Animalia
- Phylum: Arthropoda
- Class: Insecta
- Order: Lepidoptera
- Superfamily: Noctuoidea
- Family: Erebidae
- Subfamily: Arctiinae
- Genus: Radiarctia
- Species: R. melanochoria

Binomial name
- Radiarctia melanochoria (Hering, 1932)

Synonyms
- Spilosoma melanochroium Hering, 1932; Radiarctia melanochorium

Species of moth

Radiarctia melanochoria is a moth in the family Erebidae. It was described by Erich Hering in 1932. It is found in the Democratic Republic of the Congo and Rwanda.
