= Afroarctia histrionica =

Scientific classification
- Kingdom: Animalia
- Phylum: Arthropoda
- Class: Insecta
- Order: Lepidoptera
- Superfamily: Noctuoidea
- Family: Erebidae
- Subfamily: Arctiinae
- Genus: Afroarctia
- Species: A. histrionica

Binomial name
- Afroarctia histrionica Toulgoët, 1978

Species of moth

Afroarctia histrionica is a moth of the family Erebidae. It was described by Hervé de Toulgoët in 1978. It is found in Rwanda.
