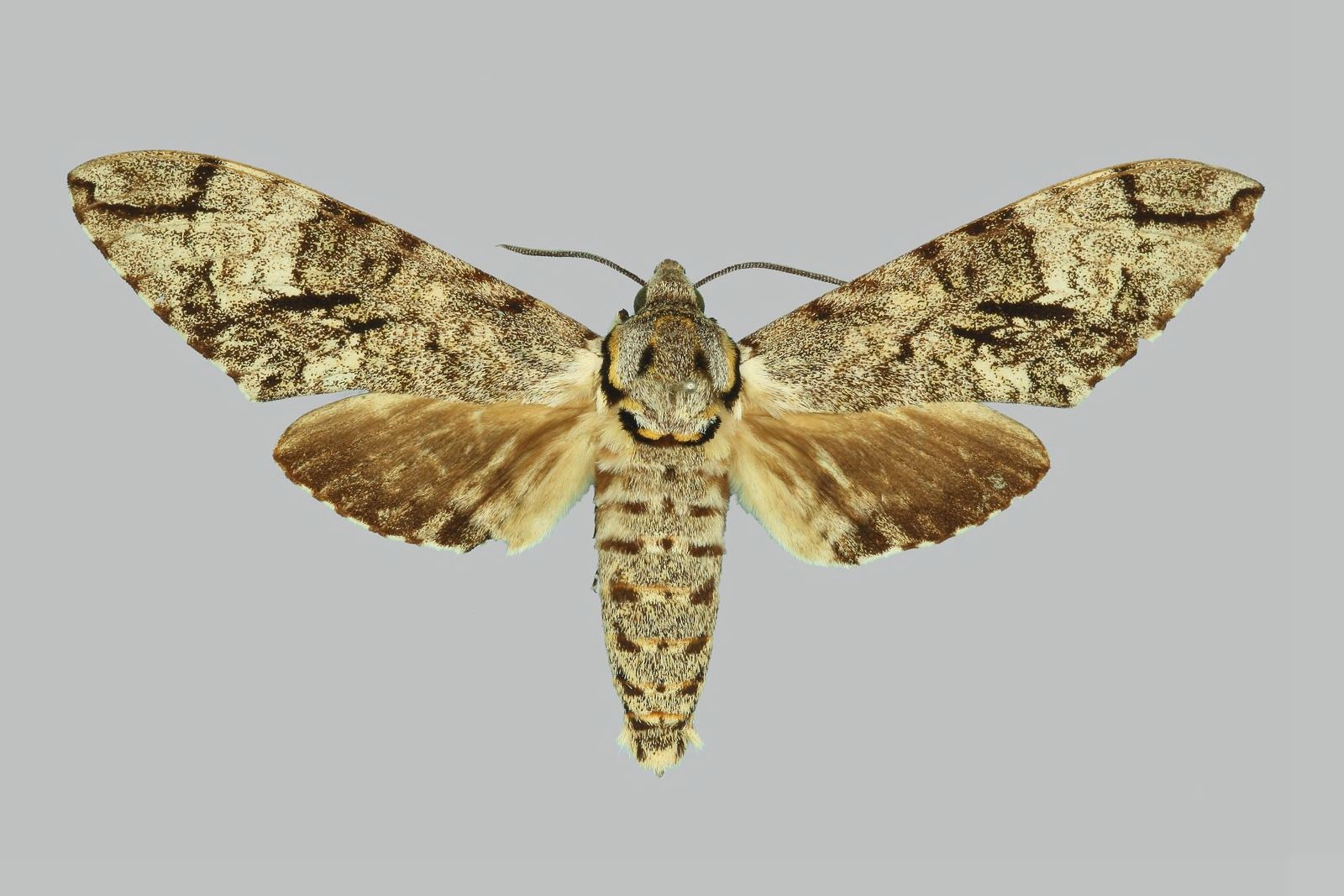
- Male

Scientific classification
- Domain: Eukaryota
- Kingdom: Animalia
- Phylum: Arthropoda
- Class: Insecta
- Order: Lepidoptera
- Family: Sphingidae
- Genus: Macropoliana
- Species: M. ferax

Binomial name
- Macropoliana ferax (Rothschild & Jordan, 1916)

Synonyms
- Poliana ferax Rothschild & Jordan, 1916

= Macropoliana ferax =

Species of moth

Macropoliana ferax is a moth of the family Sphingidae. It is known from highland forests in East Africa, including the Democratic Republic of the Congo, Rwanda, Tanzania, Kenya and Malawi.

The length of the forewings is 45–52 mm.
