= Afroarctia kenyana =

Scientific classification
- Domain: Eukaryota
- Kingdom: Animalia
- Phylum: Arthropoda
- Class: Insecta
- Order: Lepidoptera
- Superfamily: Noctuoidea
- Family: Erebidae
- Subfamily: Arctiinae
- Genus: Afroarctia
- Species: A. kenyana

Binomial name
- Afroarctia kenyana (Rothschild, 1933)

Synonyms
- Teracotona kenyana Rothschild, 1933; Spilosoma leopoldi Debauche, 1942

Species of moth

Afroarctia kenyana is a moth of the family Erebidae. It was described by Rothschild in 1933. It is found in Kenya, Uganda, Rwanda, Zaire and Cameroon.
