= Afroarctia bergeri =

Scientific classification
- Kingdom: Animalia
- Phylum: Arthropoda
- Class: Insecta
- Order: Lepidoptera
- Superfamily: Noctuoidea
- Family: Erebidae
- Subfamily: Arctiinae
- Genus: Afroarctia
- Species: A. bergeri

Binomial name
- Afroarctia bergeri Toulgoët, 1978

Species of moth

Afroarctia bergeri is a moth of the family Erebidae. It was described by Hervé de Toulgoët in 1978. It is found in Zaire, Rwanda, Cameroon and Gabon.
