= Callocosmeta =

Scientific classification
- Kingdom: Animalia
- Phylum: Arthropoda
- Clade: Pancrustacea
- Class: Insecta
- Order: Lepidoptera
- Family: Tineidae
- Genus: Callocosmeta
- Species: C. eupicta

Binomial name
- Callocosmeta eupicta Gozmány, 1969

Genus of moths

Callocosmeta is a monotypic genus of tineid moths. It contains the single species Callocosmeta eupicta, which is native to Madagascar.
