= Phyllonorycter adderis =

Scientific classification
- Domain: Eukaryota
- Kingdom: Animalia
- Phylum: Arthropoda
- Class: Insecta
- Order: Lepidoptera
- Family: Gracillariidae
- Genus: Phyllonorycter
- Species: P. adderis

Binomial name
- Phyllonorycter adderis de Prins, 2012

Species of moth

Phyllonorycter adderis is a moth of the family Gracillariidae. It is found in south-western Rwanda in montane, closed canopy forests at an altitude of about 1,800 metres.
