= Hapsifera glebata =

Scientific classification
- Kingdom: Animalia
- Phylum: Arthropoda
- Class: Insecta
- Order: Lepidoptera
- Family: Tineidae
- Genus: Hapsifera
- Species: H. glebata

Binomial name
- Hapsifera glebata Meyrick, 1908

Synonyms
- Hapsifera cervina Gozmány, 1965

Species of moth

Hapsifera glebata is a moth of the family Tineidae. It is known from South Africa and Uganda. It has a wingspan of 15-18 mm.
