= Rhipidarctia forsteri =

Scientific classification
- Kingdom: Animalia
- Phylum: Arthropoda
- Class: Insecta
- Order: Lepidoptera
- Superfamily: Noctuoidea
- Family: Erebidae
- Subfamily: Arctiinae
- Genus: Rhipidarctia
- Species: R. forsteri

Binomial name
- Rhipidarctia forsteri (Kiriakoff, 1953)

Synonyms
- Elsa forsteri Kiriakoff, 1953; Rhipidarctia punctulata Kiriakoff, 1963; Rhipidarctia forsteri ruandae Kiriakoff, 1961; Rhipidarctia unicolor Kiriakoff, 1957

Species of moth

Rhipidarctia forsteri is a moth in the family Erebidae. It was described by Sergius G. Kiriakoff in 1953. It is found in the Democratic Republic of the Congo, Kenya, Rwanda and Uganda.
