= Popoudina pamphilia =

Scientific classification
- Domain: Eukaryota
- Kingdom: Animalia
- Phylum: Arthropoda
- Class: Insecta
- Order: Lepidoptera
- Superfamily: Noctuoidea
- Family: Erebidae
- Subfamily: Arctiinae
- Genus: Popoudina
- Species: P. pamphilia

Binomial name
- Popoudina pamphilia (Kiriakoff, 1958)

Synonyms
- Estigmene pamphilia Kiriakoff, 1958

Species of moth

Popoudina pamphilia is a moth of the family Erebidae. It was described by Sergius G. Kiriakoff in 1958. It is found in Kenya, Rwanda and Uganda.
