= Galtara laportei =

Scientific classification
- Kingdom: Animalia
- Phylum: Arthropoda
- Class: Insecta
- Order: Lepidoptera
- Superfamily: Noctuoidea
- Family: Erebidae
- Subfamily: Arctiinae
- Genus: Galtara
- Species: G. laportei

Binomial name
- Galtara laportei Toulgoët, 1979

Species of moth

Galtara laportei is a moth of the subfamily Arctiinae. It was described by Hervé de Toulgoët in 1979. It is found in Rwanda.
