= Scopula melanopis =

Scientific classification
- Kingdom: Animalia
- Phylum: Arthropoda
- Clade: Pancrustacea
- Class: Insecta
- Order: Lepidoptera
- Family: Geometridae
- Genus: Scopula
- Species: S. melanopis

Binomial name
- Scopula melanopis (L. B. Prout, 1929)

Synonyms
- Cartaletis melanopis Prout, 1929

Species of geometer moth in subfamily Sterrhinae

Scopula melanopis is a moth of the family Geometridae. It is found in Rwanda.
