= Rhipidarctia subminiata =

Scientific classification
- Domain: Eukaryota
- Kingdom: Animalia
- Phylum: Arthropoda
- Class: Insecta
- Order: Lepidoptera
- Superfamily: Noctuoidea
- Family: Erebidae
- Subfamily: Arctiinae
- Genus: Rhipidarctia
- Species: R. subminiata

Binomial name
- Rhipidarctia subminiata Kiriakoff, 1959

Species of moth

Rhipidarctia subminiata is a moth in the family Erebidae. It was described by Sergius G. Kiriakoff in 1959. It is found in the Democratic Republic of the Congo.
