= Cimitra horridella =

Scientific classification
- Kingdom: Animalia
- Phylum: Arthropoda
- Class: Insecta
- Order: Lepidoptera
- Family: Tineidae
- Genus: Cimitra
- Species: C. horridella

Binomial name
- Cimitra horridella (Walker, 1863)

Synonyms
- Tinea horridella Walker, 1863; Euplocamus horridellus Walsingham; Scalidomia horridella Walsingham, 1881

Species of moth

Cimitra horridella is a moth in the family Tineidae. It is found in South Africa, Uganda, Zimbabwe and Madagascar.
