= Soloe splendida =

Scientific classification
- Kingdom: Animalia
- Phylum: Arthropoda
- Clade: Pancrustacea
- Class: Insecta
- Order: Lepidoptera
- Superfamily: Noctuoidea
- Family: Erebidae
- Genus: Soloe
- Species: S. splendida

Binomial name
- Soloe splendida Toulgoët, 1980

Species of moth

Soloe splendida is a moth in the family Erebidae that was first described by French entomologist Hervé de Toulgoët in 1980. It is found in the high-altitude montane forests of Rwanda, and particularly in Nyungwe Forest, a UNESCO World Heritage site in the country. Specimens were collected by Bernard Turlin in 1976 at an elevation of 2,700 meters, and the adult male holotype is kept in the Bavarian State Collection of Zoology.

The term splendida means "splendid" or "brilliant" in Latin in reference to the moth's striking appearance.
