= Seydelia =

Scientific classification
- Domain: Eukaryota
- Kingdom: Animalia
- Phylum: Arthropoda
- Class: Insecta
- Order: Lepidoptera
- Superfamily: Noctuoidea
- Family: Erebidae
- Subfamily: Arctiinae
- Subtribe: Spilosomina
- Genus: Seydelia; Kiriakoff, 1952

Type species
- Seydelia celsicola Toulgoët, 1976

Genus of moths

Seydelia is a genus of moths in the family Erebidae from the Afrotropics. The genus was described by Sergius G. Kiriakoff in 1952.

== Species ==
- Seydelia ellioti (Butler, 1896)
- Seydelia geometrica (Oberthür, 1883)
- Seydelia turlini Toulgoët, 1976
  - Seydelia turlini celsicola Toulgoët, 1976

== Former species ==
- Seydelia kostlani (Gaede, 1923)
- Seydelia melaena (Hampson, 1901)
- Seydelia melaenoides (Rothschild, 1935)
