= J. lutea =

J. lutea may refer to:

- Japonica lutea, a gossamer-winged butterfly
- Josa lutea, an anyphaenid sac spider
- Judalana lutea, a jumping spider
