= Chelis golbecki =

Scientific classification
- Kingdom: Animalia
- Phylum: Arthropoda
- Clade: Pancrustacea
- Class: Insecta
- Order: Lepidoptera
- Superfamily: Noctuoidea
- Family: Erebidae
- Subfamily: Arctiinae
- Genus: Chelis
- Species: C. golbecki

Binomial name
- Chelis golbecki (Dubatolov, 1996)

Synonyms
- Palearctia golbecki Dubatolov, 1996

Species of moth

Chelis golbecki is a moth in the family Erebidae. It was described by Vladimir Viktorovitch Dubatolov in 1996. It is found in the Kyrgyz Ala-Too Range of Central Asia.

This species was moved from the genus Palearctia to Chelis as a result of phylogenetic research published in 2016.
