= Chelis kozlovi =

Scientific classification
- Kingdom: Animalia
- Phylum: Arthropoda
- Clade: Pancrustacea
- Class: Insecta
- Order: Lepidoptera
- Superfamily: Noctuoidea
- Family: Erebidae
- Subfamily: Arctiinae
- Genus: Chelis (Dubatolov, 2008)
- Species: C. kozlovi

Binomial name
- Chelis kozlovi Dubatolov, 2008

Synonyms
- Palerontobia kozlovi Dubatolov, 2008

Genus of moths

Chelis kozlovi is a tiger moth species in the family Erebidae. It is found in northeastern Tibet (China, Qinghai). The species was first described by Vladimir Viktorovich Dubatolov in 2008. The species name is after Pyotr Kozlov, a disciple of Nikolay Przhevalsky, who first collected the holotype in 1900.

This species was moved to Chelis as a result of phylogenetic research published by Rönkä et al. in 2016.

== Description ==
It has similar external characteristics as the species O. dalailama de Freina: head covered in long shaggy hairs; palpi porrect, short, with long hairs; eyes small and oval, without hairs, on a hairless Sclerite.
