= Afrojavanica =

Scientific classification
- Kingdom: Animalia
- Phylum: Arthropoda
- Clade: Pancrustacea
- Class: Insecta
- Order: Lepidoptera
- Superfamily: Noctuoidea
- Family: Erebidae
- Subfamily: Arctiinae
- Subtribe: Spilosomina
- Genus: Afrojavanica; Dubatolov, 2006

Type species
- Pericallia geometrica kostlani Gaede, 1923

Genus of moths

Afrojavanica is a genus of tiger moths in the family Erebidae. The moths have a curious, disruptive distribution in northeast Africa (Ethiopia) and Sundaland (Java).

== Species ==
- Afrojavanica kostlani (Gaede, 1923)
- Afrojavanica melaena (Hampson, 1901)
- Afrojavanica melaenoides (Rothschild, 1935)
