= Divarctia =

Scientific classification
- Kingdom: Animalia
- Phylum: Arthropoda
- Clade: Pancrustacea
- Class: Insecta
- Order: Lepidoptera
- Superfamily: Noctuoidea
- Family: Erebidae
- Subfamily: Arctiinae
- Genus: Divarctia; Dubatolov, 1990
- Species: D. diva

Binomial name
- Divarctia diva (Staudinger, 1887)

Synonyms
- Ocnogyna diva Staudinger, 1887; Cymbalophora diva

Genus of moths

Divarctia is a monotypic genus of tiger moths in the family Erebidae. The genus contains one species, Divarctia diva, from Central Asia.
