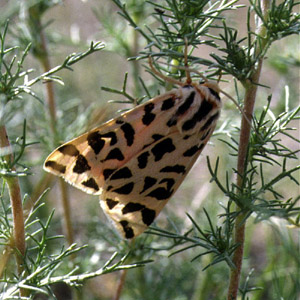
- A female

Scientific classification
- Kingdom: Animalia
- Phylum: Arthropoda
- Clade: Pancrustacea
- Class: Insecta
- Order: Lepidoptera
- Superfamily: Noctuoidea
- Family: Erebidae
- Subfamily: Arctiinae
- Genus: Chelis; Dubatolov, 1990
- Species: C. mongolica

Binomial name
- Chelis mongolica (Alphéraky, 1888)

Synonyms
- Centrarctia mongolica (Alphéraky, 1888); Arctia mongolica Alphéraky, 1888; Palearctia mongolica; Arctia serarum Grum-Grshimailo, 1899; Arctia serum Grum-Grshimailo, 1902

= Chelis mongolica =

Genus of moths

Chelis mongolica is a species of tiger moth in the family Erebidae, described by Sergei Alphéraky in 1888. It is found in the Gobi Desert and neighboring arid territories.

The larvae feed on Artemisia sieversiana.

This species was moved from the genus Centrarctia to Chelis as a result of phylogenetic research published in 2016.
