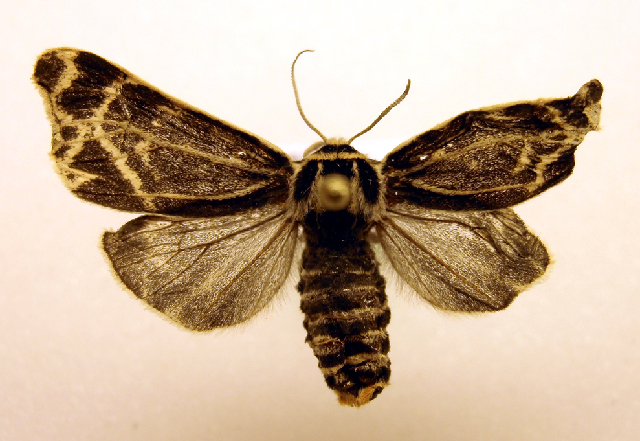

Scientific classification
- Kingdom: Animalia
- Phylum: Arthropoda
- Class: Insecta
- Order: Lepidoptera
- Superfamily: Noctuoidea
- Family: Erebidae
- Subfamily: Arctiinae
- Genus: Chelis
- Species: C. puengeleri

Binomial name
- Chelis puengeleri (O. Bang-Haas, 1927)

Synonyms
- Holoarctia puengeleri (O. Bang-Haas, 1927); Orodemnias puengeleri O. Bang-Haas, 1927; Orodemnias cervini fridolini Torstenius, 1971; Holoarctia cervini perunovi Dubatolov, 1990

= Chelis puengeleri =

Species of moth

Chelis puengeleri is a moth of the family Erebidae. It was described by Otto Bang-Haas in 1927. It is found in northern Scandinavia, Russia, Mongolia and Alaska.

The wingspan is 31–37 mm. Adults are on wing in June and July.

The larvae feed on Salix herbacea.

This species was formerly a member of the genus Holoarctia, but was moved to Chelis along with the other species of the genera Holoarctia, Neoarctia, and Hyperborea.

== Subspecies ==
- Chelis puengeleri puengeleri
- Chelis puengeleri fridolini (Torstenius, 1971)
- Chelis puengeleri iremelica Dubatolov, 2007 (Russia: Chelyabinsk Province)
- Chelis puengeleri perunovi Dubatolov, 1990 (Russia: South Siberian Mountains, north-western Mongolia)
- Chelis puengeleri sibirica Dubatolov, 2007 (Russia: Yakutia)
