= Chelis marinae =

Scientific classification
- Kingdom: Animalia
- Phylum: Arthropoda
- Clade: Pancrustacea
- Class: Insecta
- Order: Lepidoptera
- Superfamily: Noctuoidea
- Family: Erebidae
- Subfamily: Arctiinae
- Genus: Chelis
- Species: C. marinae

Binomial name
- Chelis marinae (Dubatolov, 1985)

Synonyms
- Holoarctia marinae Dubatolov, 1985

Species of moth

Chelis marinae is a moth of the family Erebidae. It was described by Vladimir Viktorovitch Dubatolov in 1985. It is found in Russia (the Terektinskii and Kuraiskii mountain ranges).

This species was formerly a member of the genus Holoarctia, but was moved to Chelis along with the other species of the genera Holoarctia, Neoarctia, and Hyperborea.
