= Eospilarctia fangchenglaiae =

Scientific classification
- Kingdom: Animalia
- Phylum: Arthropoda
- Clade: Pancrustacea
- Class: Insecta
- Order: Lepidoptera
- Superfamily: Noctuoidea
- Family: Erebidae
- Subfamily: Arctiinae
- Genus: Eospilarctia
- Species: E. fangchenglaiae

Binomial name
- Eospilarctia fangchenglaiae Dubatolov, Kishida & Wang, 2008

Species of moth

Eospilarctia fangchenglaiae is a moth of the family Erebidae first described by Vladimir Viktorovitch Dubatolov, Yasunori Kishida and Min Wang in 2008. It is found in the Chinese provinces of Sichuan, Yunnan, Guangdong, Zhejiang, Jiangxi, Shaanxi, Hubei and Hunan.
