= Chelis marxi =

Scientific classification
- Kingdom: Animalia
- Phylum: Arthropoda
- Class: Insecta
- Order: Lepidoptera
- Superfamily: Noctuoidea
- Family: Erebidae
- Subfamily: Arctiinae
- Genus: Chelis
- Species: C. marxi

Binomial name
- Chelis marxi (O. Bang-Haas, 1927)

Synonyms
- Palearctia marxi (O. Bang-Haas, 1927); Micrarctia kindermanni marxi O. Bang-Haas, 1927

Species of moth

Chelis marxi is a moth in the family Erebidae. It was described by Otto Bang-Haas in 1927. It is found in Himachal Pradesh, India.

This species was moved from the genus Palearctia to Chelis as a result of phylogenetic research published in 2016.
