= Chelis buraetica =

Scientific classification
- Kingdom: Animalia
- Phylum: Arthropoda
- Clade: Pancrustacea
- Class: Insecta
- Order: Lepidoptera
- Superfamily: Noctuoidea
- Family: Erebidae
- Subfamily: Arctiinae
- Genus: Chelis
- Species: C. buraetica

Binomial name
- Chelis buraetica (O. Bang-Haas, 1927)

Synonyms
- Sibirarctia buraetica(O. Bang-Haas, 1927); Micrarctia buraetica O. Bang-Haas, 1927; Micrarctia buraetica elwesi O.Bang-Haas, 1927; Micrarctia buraetica validus O. Bang-Haas, 1927

Species of moth

Chelis buraetica is a moth in the family Erebidae. It was described by Otto Bang-Haas in 1927. It is found in Russia (Altai, Tuva, Sayan, Baikal, Transbaikalia, Yakutia) and Mongolia.

This species was moved from the genus Sibirarctia to Chelis as a result of phylogenetic research published in 2016.

== Subspecies ==
- Chelis buraetica buraetica (south-eastern Atlai, Tuva, Baikal, Transbaikalia, central Yakutia, Mongolia)
- Chelis buraetica chajataensis Dubatolov, 1996 (mountains of eastern Yakutia)
- Chelis buraetica validus (O.Bang-Haas, 1927) (south-western Transbaikalia)
