= Chelis ammosovi =

Scientific classification
- Kingdom: Animalia
- Phylum: Arthropoda
- Clade: Pancrustacea
- Class: Insecta
- Order: Lepidoptera
- Superfamily: Noctuoidea
- Family: Erebidae
- Subfamily: Arctiinae
- Genus: Chelis
- Species: C. ammosovi

Binomial name
- Chelis ammosovi (Dubatolov & Gurko, 2002)

Synonyms
- Palearctia ammosovi Dubatolov & Gurko, 2002

Species of moth

Chelis ammosovi is a moth in the family Erebidae. It was described by Vladimir Viktorovitch Dubatolov and Vladimir O. Gurko in 2002. It is found in Sichuan, China.

This species was moved from the genus Palearctia to Chelis as a result of phylogenetic research published in 2016.
