= Eospilarctia yuennanica =

Scientific classification
- Kingdom: Animalia
- Phylum: Arthropoda
- Clade: Pancrustacea
- Class: Insecta
- Order: Lepidoptera
- Superfamily: Noctuoidea
- Family: Erebidae
- Subfamily: Arctiinae
- Genus: Eospilarctia
- Species: E. yuennanica

Binomial name
- Eospilarctia yuennanica (Daniel, 1943)

Synonyms
- Spilarctia yuennanica Daniel, 1943

Species of moth

Eospilarctia yuennanica is a moth of the family Erebidae first described by Franz Daniel in 1943. It is found in China and Vietnam.

The wingspan is 59–66 mm.

== Subspecies ==
- Eospilarctia yuennanica yuennanica (China: Sichuan, Yunnan)
- Eospilarctia yuennanica fansipana Saldaitis et al., 2012 (Vietnam: Chapa, Mount Fan-si-pan)

Eospilarctia guangdonga was formerly treated as a subspecies of Eospilarctia yuennanica.

== Gallery ==
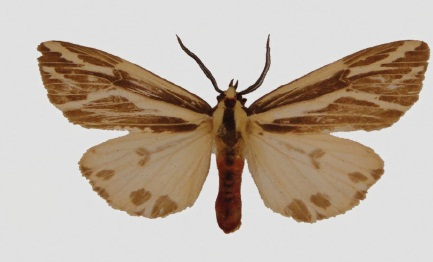
Eospilarctia yuennanica yuennanica male

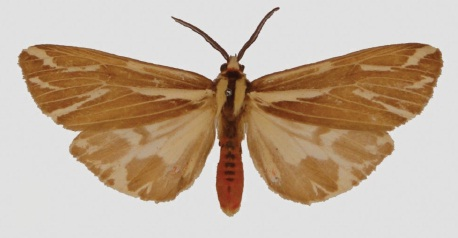
Eospilarctia yuennanica yuennanica male

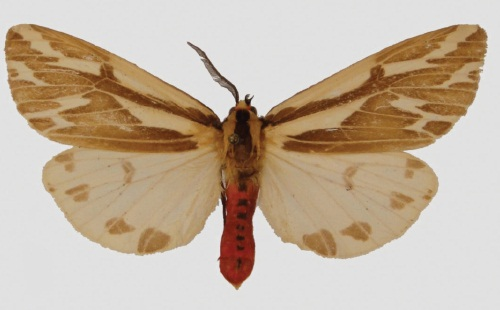
Eospilarctia yuennanica fansipana male
