= Chelis gracilis =

Scientific classification
- Kingdom: Animalia
- Phylum: Arthropoda
- Clade: Pancrustacea
- Class: Insecta
- Order: Lepidoptera
- Superfamily: Noctuoidea
- Family: Erebidae
- Subfamily: Arctiinae
- Genus: Chelis
- Species: C. gracilis

Binomial name
- Chelis gracilis (Dubatolov, 1996)

Synonyms
- Palearctia gracilis Dubatolov, 1996; Palearctia erschoffi miranda Plustsch & Dolin, 2000; Palearctia erschoffi arcana Plustsch & Dolin, 2000

Species of moth

Chelis gracilis is a moth in the family Erebidae. It was described by Vladimir Viktorovitch Dubatolov in 1996. It is found in the Chatkal Mountains and Kyrgyzstan.

This species was moved from the genus Palearctia to Chelis as a result of phylogenetic research published in 2016.

== Subspecies ==
- Chelis gracilis gracilis
- Chelis gracilis arcana (Plustsch & Dolin, 2000) (Kyrgyzstan)
