= Chelis turkestana =

Scientific classification
- Kingdom: Animalia
- Phylum: Arthropoda
- Clade: Pancrustacea
- Class: Insecta
- Order: Lepidoptera
- Superfamily: Noctuoidea
- Family: Erebidae
- Subfamily: Arctiinae
- Genus: Chelis
- Species: C. turkestana

Binomial name
- Chelis turkestana (Dubatolov, 1996)

Synonyms
- Palearctia turkestana Dubatolov, 1996; Palearctia ferghana turkestana Dubatolov, 1996

Species of moth

Chelis turkestana is a moth in the family Erebidae. It was described by Vladimir Viktorovitch Dubatolov in 1996. It is found in the Turkestan Range in Central Asia.

This species was moved from the genus Palearctia to Chelis as a result of phylogenetic research published in 2016.
