= Chelis cervini =

Scientific classification
- Kingdom: Animalia
- Phylum: Arthropoda
- Class: Insecta
- Order: Lepidoptera
- Superfamily: Noctuoidea
- Family: Erebidae
- Subfamily: Arctiinae
- Genus: Chelis
- Species: C. cervini

Binomial name
- Chelis cervini (Fallou, 1864)

Synonyms
- Holoarctia cervini (Fallou, 1864); Nemeophila cervini Fallou, 1864; Arctia cervini var. hnateckii Frey, 1872; Phragmatobia cervina Hampson, 1901; Orodemnias cervini rougemonti O. Bang-Haas, 1927; Orodemnias cervini scriniensis Berthet, 1948; Orodemnias cervini steitei Röber, 1930; Orodemnias cervini teriolensis Burmann, 1975; Orodemnias cervini splendida Gerber, 1979

Species of moth

Chelis cervini is a moth of the family Erebidae first described by Jules Ferdinand Fallou in 1864. It is endemic to the Alps and is found on altitudes of 2,600 to 3,200 meters.

The wingspan is about 30 mm. The species has one generation every two to three years.

The larvae feed on Alchemilla alpina and Plantago alpina.

This species was formerly a member of the genus Holoarctia, but was moved to Chelis along with the other species of the genera Holoarctia, Neoarctia, and Hyperborea.
