= Chelis mira =

Scientific classification
- Kingdom: Animalia
- Phylum: Arthropoda
- Clade: Pancrustacea
- Class: Insecta
- Order: Lepidoptera
- Superfamily: Noctuoidea
- Family: Erebidae
- Subfamily: Arctiinae
- Genus: Chelis
- Species: C. mira

Binomial name
- Chelis mira (Dubatolov & Tshistjakov, 1989)

Synonyms
- Palearctia mira Dubatolov & Tshistjakov, 1989

Species of moth

Chelis mira is a moth in the family Erebidae. It was described by Vladimir Viktorovitch Dubatolov and Yuri A. Tshistjakov in 1989. It is found in the south-eastern Altai Mountains (the Kuraiskii Range).

This species was moved from the genus Palearctia to Chelis as a result of phylogenetic research published in 2016.
