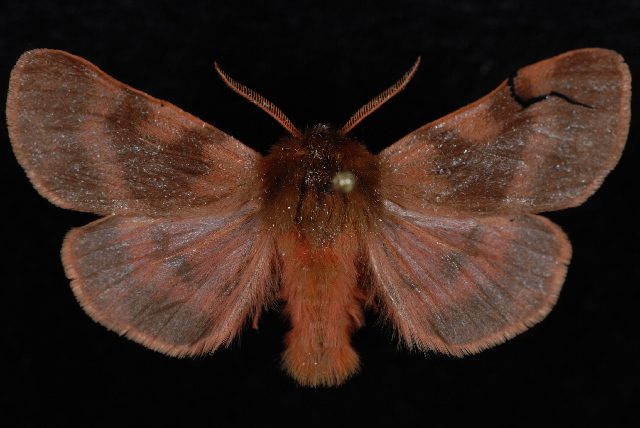

Scientific classification
- Kingdom: Animalia
- Phylum: Arthropoda
- Class: Insecta
- Order: Lepidoptera
- Superfamily: Noctuoidea
- Family: Erebidae
- Subfamily: Arctiinae
- Genus: Chelis
- Species: C. beanii

Binomial name
- Chelis beanii (Neumoegen, 1891)

Synonyms
- Neoarctia beanii (Neumoegen, 1891); Antarctia beanii Neumoegen, 1891; Phgragmtobia var. fuscosa Neumoegen, 1891

= Chelis beanii =

Bean's tiger moth

Species of moth

Chelis beanii, or Bean's tiger moth, is a species of moth in the family Erebidae. It was first described by Berthold Neumoegen in 1891. It is found in the Rocky Mountains, where it has been recorded from Alberta, British Columbia and southern Montana. The habitat consists of open forests, subalpine meadows and parklands.

The length of the forewings is 16–17 mm. Adults are on wing from mid-July to mid-August.

The larvae probably feed on various herbaceous plants.

This species was formerly a member of the genus Neoarctia, but was moved to Chelis along with the other species of the genera Holoarctia, Neoarctia, and Hyperborea.
