= Chelis ferghana =

Scientific classification
- Kingdom: Animalia
- Phylum: Arthropoda
- Class: Insecta
- Order: Lepidoptera
- Superfamily: Noctuoidea
- Family: Erebidae
- Subfamily: Arctiinae
- Genus: Chelis
- Species: C. ferghana

Binomial name
- Chelis ferghana (Staudinger, 1887)

Synonyms
- Palearctia ferghana (Staudinger, 1887); Arctia erschoffi var. ferghana Staudinger, 1887; Palearctia erschoffi Plustsch & Dolin, 2000; Arctia schottlaenderi Strand, 1912; Palearctia sussamyra Dubatolov, 1996

Species of moth

Chelis ferghana is a moth in the family Erebidae. It was described by Otto Staudinger in 1887. It is found in Central Asia (Alai, Sussamyr, Turkestan Range, possibly the Pamirs, and Tien Shan), Afghanistan and possibly Nepal.

This species, along with the others of the genus Palearctia, was moved to Chelis as a result of phylogenetic research published by Rönkä et al. in 2016.

== Subspecies ==
- Chelis ferghana ferghana (Alai Mountains)
- Chelis ferghana schottlaenderi (Strand, 1912) (Tien Shan)
- Chelis ferghana sussamyra Dubatolov, 1996 (Suusamyr Mountains)
