= Eospilarctia pauper =

Scientific classification
- Domain: Eukaryota
- Kingdom: Animalia
- Phylum: Arthropoda
- Class: Insecta
- Order: Lepidoptera
- Superfamily: Noctuoidea
- Family: Erebidae
- Subfamily: Arctiinae
- Genus: Eospilarctia
- Species: E. pauper

Binomial name
- Eospilarctia pauper (Oberthür, 1911)

Synonyms
- Phragmatobia pauper Oberthür, 1911

Species of moth

Eospilarctia pauper is a moth of the family Erebidae first described by Charles Oberthür in 1911. It is found in the Chinese provinces of Sichuan and Yunnan.
