= Chelis lafontainei =

Scientific classification
- Kingdom: Animalia
- Phylum: Arthropoda
- Class: Insecta
- Order: Lepidoptera
- Superfamily: Noctuoidea
- Family: Erebidae
- Subfamily: Arctiinae
- Genus: Chelis
- Species: C. lafontainei

Binomial name
- Chelis lafontainei (Ferguson, 1995)

Synonyms
- Neoarctia lafontainei Ferguson, 1995

Species of moth

Chelis lafontainei is a moth of the family Erebidae. It was described by Douglas C. Ferguson in 1995. It is found in Canada's Northwest Territories.

This species was formerly a member of the genus Neoarctia, but was moved to Chelis along with the other species of the genera Holoarctia, Neoarctia, and Hyperborea.
