= Chelis dubatolovi =

Scientific classification
- Kingdom: Animalia
- Phylum: Arthropoda
- Clade: Pancrustacea
- Class: Insecta
- Order: Lepidoptera
- Superfamily: Noctuoidea
- Family: Erebidae
- Subfamily: Arctiinae
- Genus: Chelis
- Species: C. dubatolovi

Binomial name
- Chelis dubatolovi (Saldaitis & Ivinskis, 2005)

Synonyms
- Holoarctia dubatolovi Saldaitis & Ivinskis, 2005

Species of moth

Chelis dubatolovi is a moth of the family Erebidae. It was described by Saldaitis and Ivinskis in 2005. It is found in the south-western Altai (the Belukha Mountains) and south-western Tuva (the West Tanuola Mountains) in Russia. The habitat probably consists of mountain tundra.

This species was formerly a member of the genus Holoarctia, but was moved to Chelis along with the other species of the genera Holoarctia, Neoarctia, and Hyperborea.

== Description and ecology ==
The wingspan is 30–32 mm (1.2–1.3 in). Adults are active during the daytime. The larvae are polyphagous.

== Etymology ==
The species is named after Russian entomologist Vladimir Dubatolov.
