= Chelis kindermanni =

Scientific classification
- Kingdom: Animalia
- Phylum: Arthropoda
- Class: Insecta
- Order: Lepidoptera
- Superfamily: Noctuoidea
- Family: Erebidae
- Subfamily: Arctiinae
- Genus: Chelis
- Species: C. kindermanni

Binomial name
- Chelis kindermanni (Staudinger, 1867)

Synonyms
- Sibirarctia kindermanni (Staudinger, 1867); Arctia kindermanni Staudinger, 1867; Phragmatobia kindermanni; Micrarctia kindermanni roseni O. Bang-Haas, 1927; Arctia latreillei chinensis Grum-Grshimailo, 1899; Micrarctia kindermanni ussuriensis O. Bang-Haas, 1927; Ocnogyna pretinosa albovittata Rothschild, 1910; Arctia kindermanni var. pomona Staudinger, 1897; Arctia pretiosa Staudinger, 1887

Species of moth

Chelis kindermanni is a moth in the family Erebidae. It was described by Otto Staudinger in 1867. It is found in Russia (southern Urals, Omsk, Novosibirsk, Krasnoyarsk, Altai, Khakasi, Baikal, Transbaikalia, Middle Amur, southern Primorye), Mongolia and China (Qinghai, Shanxi, Heilongjiang, Liaonin).

This species was moved from the genus Sibirarctia to Chelis as a result of phylogenetic research published in 2016.

== Subspecies ==
- Chelis kindermanni kindermanni
- Chelis kindermanni albovittata (Rothschild, 1910) (Tibet)
- Chelis kindermanni pomona (Staudinger, 1897) (southern banks of Lake Baikal, Transbaikalia, Upper Amur, Mongolia)
- Chelis kindermanni pretiosa (Staudinger, 1887) (Middle Amur, Primorye, Heilongjiang)
