= Chelis strigulosa =

Scientific classification
- Domain: Eukaryota
- Kingdom: Animalia
- Phylum: Arthropoda
- Class: Insecta
- Order: Lepidoptera
- Superfamily: Noctuoidea
- Family: Erebidae
- Subfamily: Arctiinae
- Genus: Chelis
- Species: C. strigulosa

Binomial name
- Chelis strigulosa (Böttcher, 1905)

Synonyms
- Chelis thianshana Dubatolov, 1988

Species of moth

Chelis strigulosa is a moth in the family Erebidae. It was described by Böttcher in 1905. It is found in Central Asia (Kirghiz Alatau, Sussamyr, Terskei Alatau, Inner Tien Shan, Trans-Ili Alatau, Dzhungarian Alatau, Tarbagatai, eastern Tien Shan).
