= Chelis simplonica =

Scientific classification
- Kingdom: Animalia
- Phylum: Arthropoda
- Class: Insecta
- Order: Lepidoptera
- Superfamily: Noctuoidea
- Family: Erebidae
- Subfamily: Arctiinae
- Genus: Chelis
- Species: C. simplonica

Binomial name
- Chelis simplonica (Boisduval, 1840)

Synonyms
- Chelonia maculosa var. simplonica Boisduval, 1840; Bombyx simplonia Freyer, 1843

Species of moth

Chelis simplonica is a moth in the family Erebidae. It was described by Jean Baptiste Boisduval in 1840. It is found in the Alps of Switzerland, France, and Italy. It has also been recorded from the Cantabrian Mountains in northwestern Spain. The habitat is mountain meadows and pastures.

Adults are on wing in July.

The larvae are polyphagous and have been recorded feeding on Galium, Plantago and Achillea species. The larvae overwinter twice.
