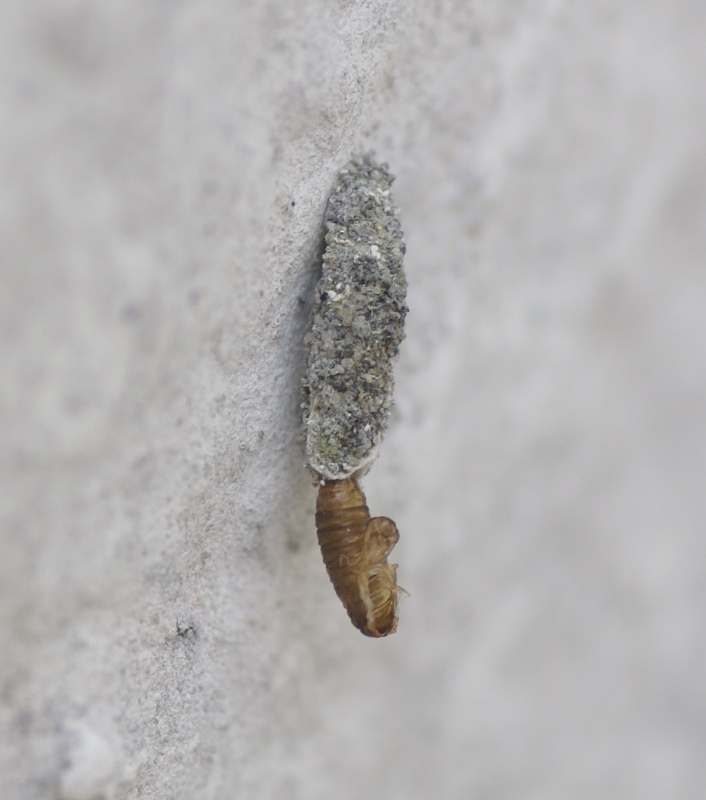
- Case and exuvia

Scientific classification
- Kingdom: Animalia
- Phylum: Arthropoda
- Class: Insecta
- Order: Lepidoptera
- Family: Psychidae
- Genus: Dahlica
- Species: D. lichenella

Binomial name
- Dahlica lichenella (Linnaeus, 1761)

Synonyms
- Tinea lichenella Linnaeus, 1761; Phalaena lichenella; Dahlica norvegica Strand, 1919

= Dahlica lichenella =

Species of moth

The Lichen Case-bearer (Dahlica lichenella) is a moth of the Psychidae family. It is found in Europe and has also been recorded in North America.

The wingspan is 13–16 mm for males. Adults are on wing from March to April or the beginning of May in western Europe. Larvae can be found from June to March and overwinter. Pupation takes place within the case in March or April.
