= Seydelia ellioti =

Scientific classification
- Domain: Eukaryota
- Kingdom: Animalia
- Phylum: Arthropoda
- Class: Insecta
- Order: Lepidoptera
- Superfamily: Noctuoidea
- Family: Erebidae
- Subfamily: Arctiinae
- Genus: Seydelia
- Species: S. ellioti

Binomial name
- Seydelia ellioti (Butler, 1896)

Synonyms
- Callarctia ellioti Butler, 1896

Species of moth

Seydelia ellioti is a moth in the family Erebidae. It was described by Arthur Gardiner Butler in 1896. It is found in Democratic Republic of the Congo, Kenya, Malawi, Rwanda, South Africa, Tanzania and Uganda.
