= Dahlica charlottae =

Scientific classification
- Domain: Eukaryota
- Kingdom: Animalia
- Phylum: Arthropoda
- Class: Insecta
- Order: Lepidoptera
- Family: Psychidae
- Subfamily: Naryciinae
- Tribe: Dahlicini
- Genus: Dahlica
- Species: D. charlottae

Binomial name
- Dahlica charlottae (Meier, 1957)

Species of moth

Dahlica charlottae is a moth belonging to the family Psychidae. The species was first described by Herbert Meier in 1957.

It is native to Europe.
