= Chelis variabilis =

Scientific classification
- Kingdom: Animalia
- Phylum: Arthropoda
- Class: Insecta
- Order: Lepidoptera
- Superfamily: Noctuoidea
- Family: Erebidae
- Subfamily: Arctiinae
- Genus: Chelis
- Species: C. variabilis

Binomial name
- Chelis variabilis (Daniel, 1966)

Synonyms
- Palearctia variabilis (Daniel, 1966); Micrarctia variabilis Daniel, 1966

Species of moth

Chelis variabilis is a moth in the family Erebidae. It was described by Franz Daniel in 1966. It is found in the Pamir Mountains of Tajikistan.

This species was moved from the genus Palearctia to Chelis as a result of phylogenetic research published in 2016.
