= Chelis brucei =

Bruce's tiger moth

Scientific classification
- Kingdom: Animalia
- Phylum: Arthropoda
- Class: Insecta
- Order: Lepidoptera
- Superfamily: Noctuoidea
- Family: Erebidae
- Subfamily: Arctiinae
- Genus: Chelis
- Species: C. brucei

Binomial name
- Chelis brucei (H. Edwards, 1888)

Synonyms
- Neoarctia brucei (H. Edwards, 1888); Arctia brucei H. Edwards, 1888

Species of moth

Chelis brucei, or Bruce's tiger moth, is a moth of the family Erebidae. It was described by Henry Edwards in 1888. It is found in western North America in the northern Cascade Mountains, the southern British Columbia Coast Range, the mountains of Vancouver Island and the Rocky Mountains of Colorado and Wyoming.

The length of the forewings is 16–17 mm. Adults are on wing from early July to early August.

Larvae have only been recorded feeding on Phacelia sericea and Taraxacum officinale. Larvae have been recorded in mid-June.

This species was formerly a member of the genus Neoarctia, but was moved to Chelis along with the other species of the genera Holoarctia, Neoarctia, and Hyperborea.
