= Eospilarctia guangdonga =

Scientific classification
- Kingdom: Animalia
- Phylum: Arthropoda
- Clade: Pancrustacea
- Class: Insecta
- Order: Lepidoptera
- Superfamily: Noctuoidea
- Family: Erebidae
- Subfamily: Arctiinae
- Genus: Eospilarctia
- Species: E. guangdonga

Binomial name
- Eospilarctia guangdonga Dubatolov, Kishida & Wang, 2008

Synonyms
- Eospilarctia yuennanica guangdonga

Species of moth

Eospilarctia guangdonga is a moth of the family Erebidae first described by Vladimir Viktorovitch Dubatolov, Yasunori Kishida and Min Wang in 2008. It is found in Guangdong, China.
