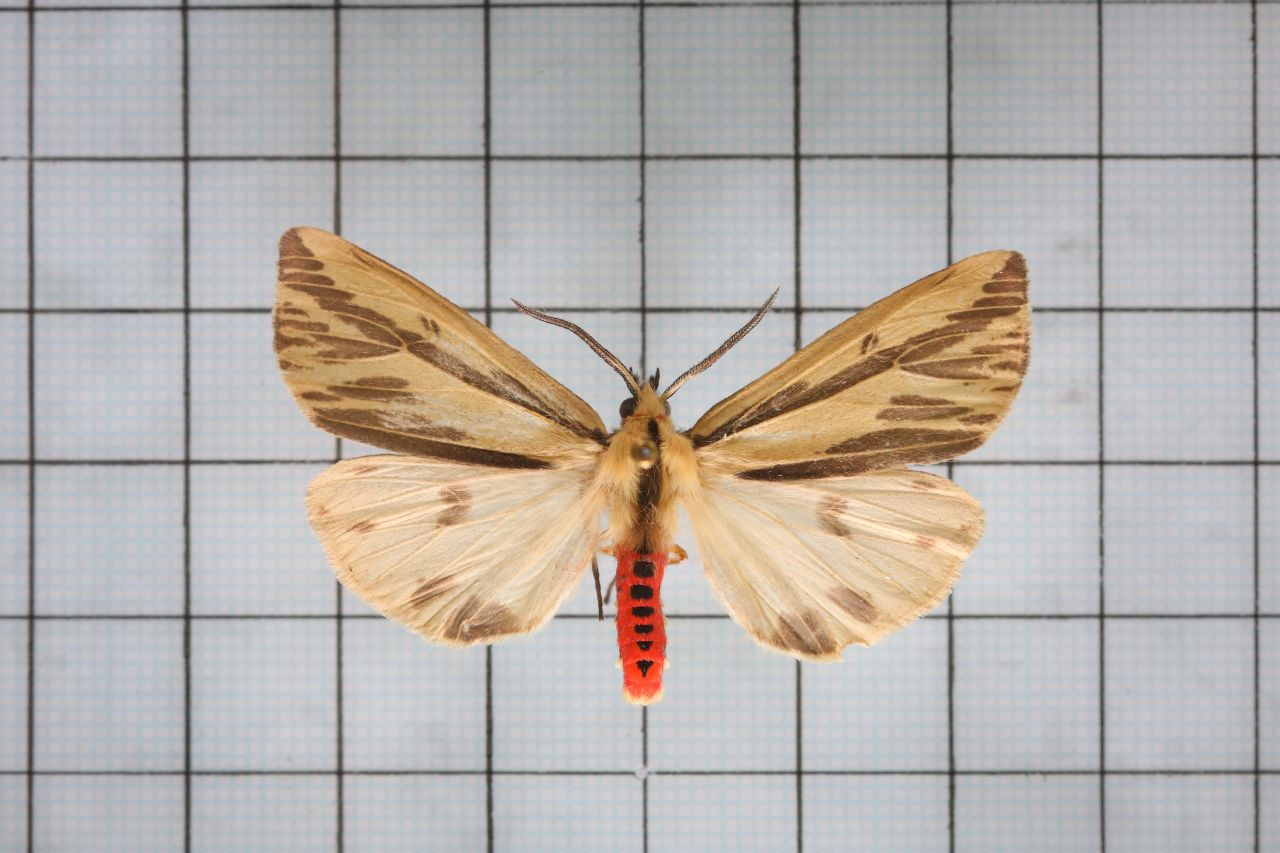

Scientific classification
- Domain: Eukaryota
- Kingdom: Animalia
- Phylum: Arthropoda
- Class: Insecta
- Order: Lepidoptera
- Superfamily: Noctuoidea
- Family: Erebidae
- Subfamily: Arctiinae
- Genus: Eospilarctia
- Species: E. nehallenia

Binomial name
- Eospilarctia nehallenia (Oberthür, 1911)

Synonyms
- Diacrisia nehallenia Oberthür, 1911; Diacrisia lewisi f. baibarensis Matsumura, 1930

= Eospilarctia nehallenia =

Species of moth

Eospilarctia nehallenia is a moth in the family Erebidae first described by Charles Oberthür in 1911. It is found in Taiwan and China.

The wingspan is 46–51 mm.

== Subspecies ==
- Eospilarctia nehallenia nehallenia (Sichuan, Shaanxi, Yunnan)
- Eospilarctia nehallenia baibarensis (Matsumura, 1930) (Taiwan)
