= Chelis glaphyra =

Scientific classification
- Kingdom: Animalia
- Phylum: Arthropoda
- Class: Insecta
- Order: Lepidoptera
- Superfamily: Noctuoidea
- Family: Erebidae
- Subfamily: Arctiinae
- Genus: Chelis
- Species: C. glaphyra

Binomial name
- Chelis glaphyra (Eversmann, 1843)

Synonyms
- Palearctia glaphyra (Eversmann, 1843); Euprepia glaphyra Eversmann, 1843; Phragmatobia glaphyra Hampson, 1901; Palearctia glaphyra Dubatolov, 1996; Micrarctia glaphyra naryna O.Bang-Haas, 1927; Palearctia naryna; Arctia glaphyra mannii Alphéraky, 1882; Micrarctia glaphyra dublitzkyi Bang-Haas, 1927

Species of moth

Chelis glaphyra is a moth in the family Erebidae. It was described by Eduard Friedrich Eversmann in 1843. It is found in eastern Kazakhstan, Kyrgyzstan, the central Tien Shan and China (Xinjiang).

This species was moved from the genus Palearctia to Chelis as a result of phylogenetic research published in 2016.

== Subspecies ==
- Chelis glaphyra glaphyra (eastern Kazakhstan)
- Chelis glaphyra aksuensis O. Bang-Haas, 1927 (Kyrgyzstan, China: Xinjiang)
- Chelis glaphyra dublitzkyi (O.Bang-Haas, 1927) (Kazakhstan, Kyrgyzstan)
- Chelis glaphyra manni (Staudinger, 1881) (north-eastern Tien Shan)
