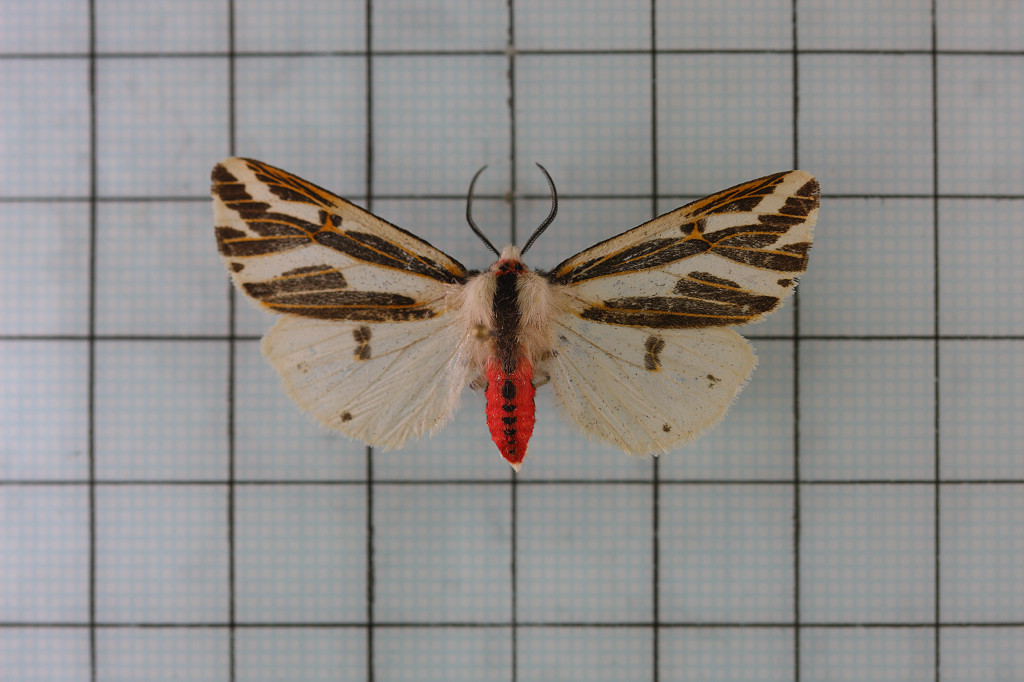
- Eospilarctia lewisii

Scientific classification
- Domain: Eukaryota
- Kingdom: Animalia
- Phylum: Arthropoda
- Class: Insecta
- Order: Lepidoptera
- Superfamily: Noctuoidea
- Family: Erebidae
- Subfamily: Arctiinae
- Subtribe: Spilosomina
- Genus: Eospilarctia; Kôda, 1988

Type species
- Seirarctia lewisii Butler, 1855

= Eospilarctia =

Genus of moths

Eospilarctia is a genus of tiger moths in the family Erebidae. It was erected by Nobutoyo Kôda in 1988. The moths are found in east Asia.

== Taxonomy ==
The genus needs in a scientific review. Some species and subspecies are still not described.

== Species ==
- Eospilarctia chuanxina (Fang, 1982)
- Eospilarctia fangchenglaiae Dubatolov, Kishida & Min, 2008
- Eospilarctia formosana (Rothschild, 1933)
- Eospilarctia guangdonga Dubatolov, Kishida & Wang, 2008
- Eospilarctia huangshanensis Fang, 2000
- Eospilarctia lewisii (Butler, 1885)
- Eospilarctia maciai Saldaitis et al., 2012
- Eospilarctia nehallenia (Oberthür, 1911)
  - Eospilarctia nehallenia baibarensis (Matsumura, 1930)
- Eospilarctia naumanni Saldaitis et al., 2012
- Eospilarctia neurographa (Hampson, 1909)
- Eospilarctia pauper (Oberthür, 1911)
- Eospilarctia taliensis (Rothschild, 1933)

=== Subgenus Pareospilarctia Dubatolov & Kishida, 2008 ===
- Eospilarctia yuennanica (Daniel, 1943)
