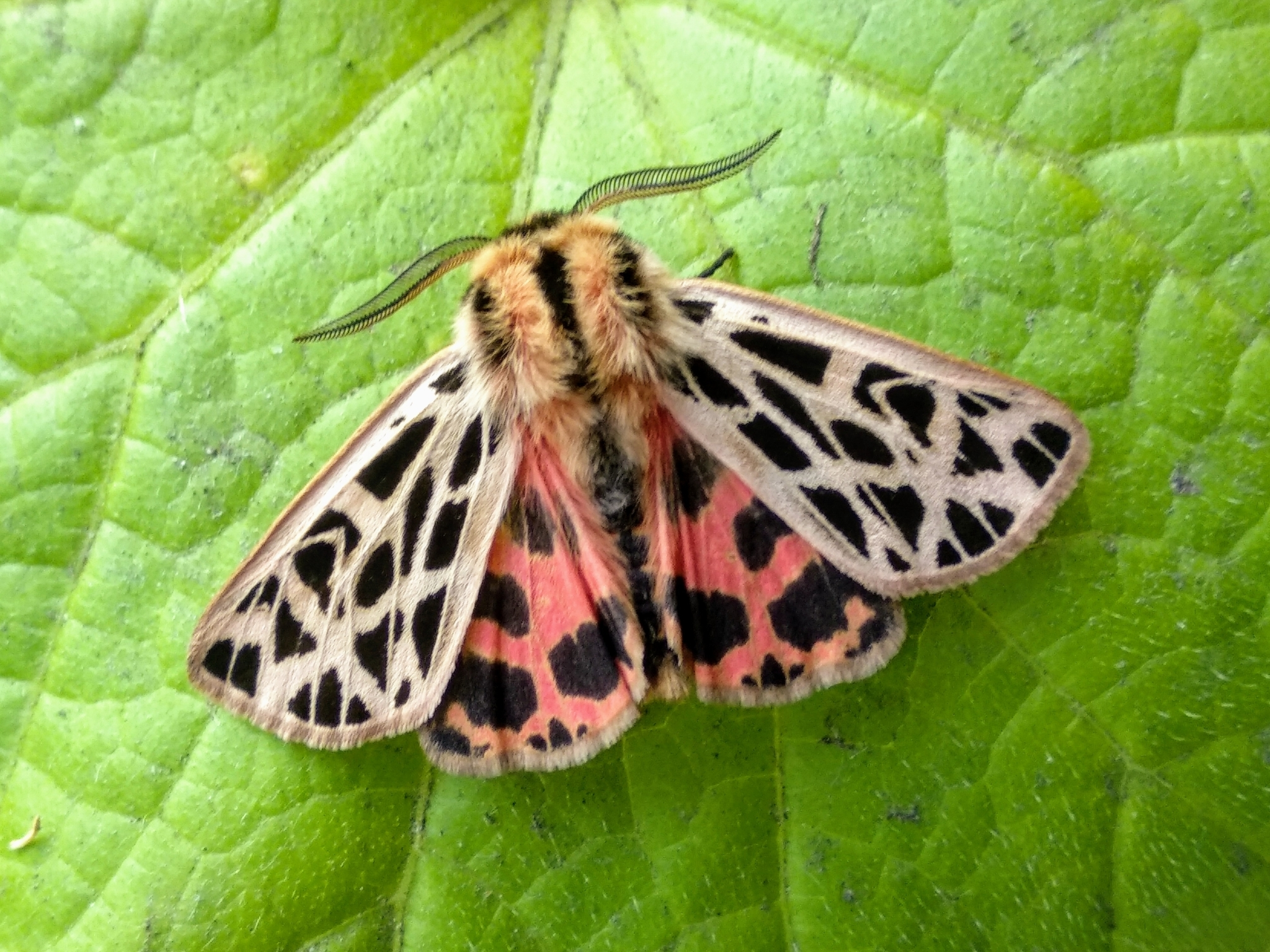
- Chelis dahurica, Russia

Scientific classification
- Kingdom: Animalia
- Phylum: Arthropoda
- Class: Insecta
- Order: Lepidoptera
- Superfamily: Noctuoidea
- Family: Erebidae
- Subfamily: Arctiinae
- Tribe: Arctiini
- Subtribe: Arctiina
- Genus: Chelis; Rambur, 1866

= Chelis (moth) =

Genus of tiger moth

Chelis is a genus of tiger moths in the family Erebidae. There are more than 30 described species in Chelis, found in the holarctic.

As a result of phylogenetic research published in 2016, the genera Holoarctia, Neoarctia, Hyperborea have been merged with Chelis, and their species are now members of the genus Chelis.

== Species ==
These species belong to the genus Chelis:

- Chelis ammosovi (Dubatolov & Gurko, 2002)
- Chelis arragonensis (Staudinger, 1894)
- Chelis beanii (Neumögen, 1891) (Bean's tiger)
- Chelis brucei (Edwards, 1888)
- Chelis buraetica (Bang-Haas, 1927)
- Chelis caecilia (Kindermann, 1853)
- Chelis cantabrica
- Chelis cecilia (Kindermann, 1853)
- Chelis cervini (Fallou, 1864)
- Chelis czekanowskii (Grum-Grshimailo, 1899)
- Chelis dahurica (Boisduval, 1832)
- Chelis dubatolovi (Saldaitis & Ivinskis, 2005)
- Chelis erschoffii (Alpheraky, 1882)
- Chelis ferghana (Staudinger, 1887)
- Chelis glaphyra (Eversmann, 1843)
- Chelis golbecki (Dubatolov, 1996)
- Chelis gracilis (Dubatolov, 1996)
- Chelis gratiosa (Grum-Grshimailo, 1890)
- Chelis hauensteini (Kautt, 1996)
- Chelis kashmirica (Ferguson, 1985)
- Chelis kindermanni (Staudinger, 1867)
- Chelis kozlovi (Dubatolov, 2008)
- Chelis lafontainei (Ferguson, 1985)
- Chelis maculosa (Gerning, 1780)
- Chelis marinae (Dubatolov, 1985)
- Chelis marxi (O. Bang-Haas, 1927)
- Chelis mira (Dubatolov & Tshistjakov, 1989)
- Chelis mongolica (Alpheraky, 1888)
- Chelis mustangbhoti (Daniel, 1961)
- Chelis pardalina (Pungeler, 1898)
- Chelis puengeleri (Bang-Haas, 1927)
- Chelis rasa (Saldaitis, Ivinskis & Churkin, 2000)
- Chelis reticulata (Christoph, 1887)
- Chelis simplonica (Boisduval, 1840)
- Chelis sordida (McDunnough, 1921)
- Chelis strigulosa (Böttcher, 1905)
- Chelis turkestana (Dubatolov, 1996)
- Chelis variabilis (Daniel, 1966)
- Chelis wagneri (Püngeler, 1918)
