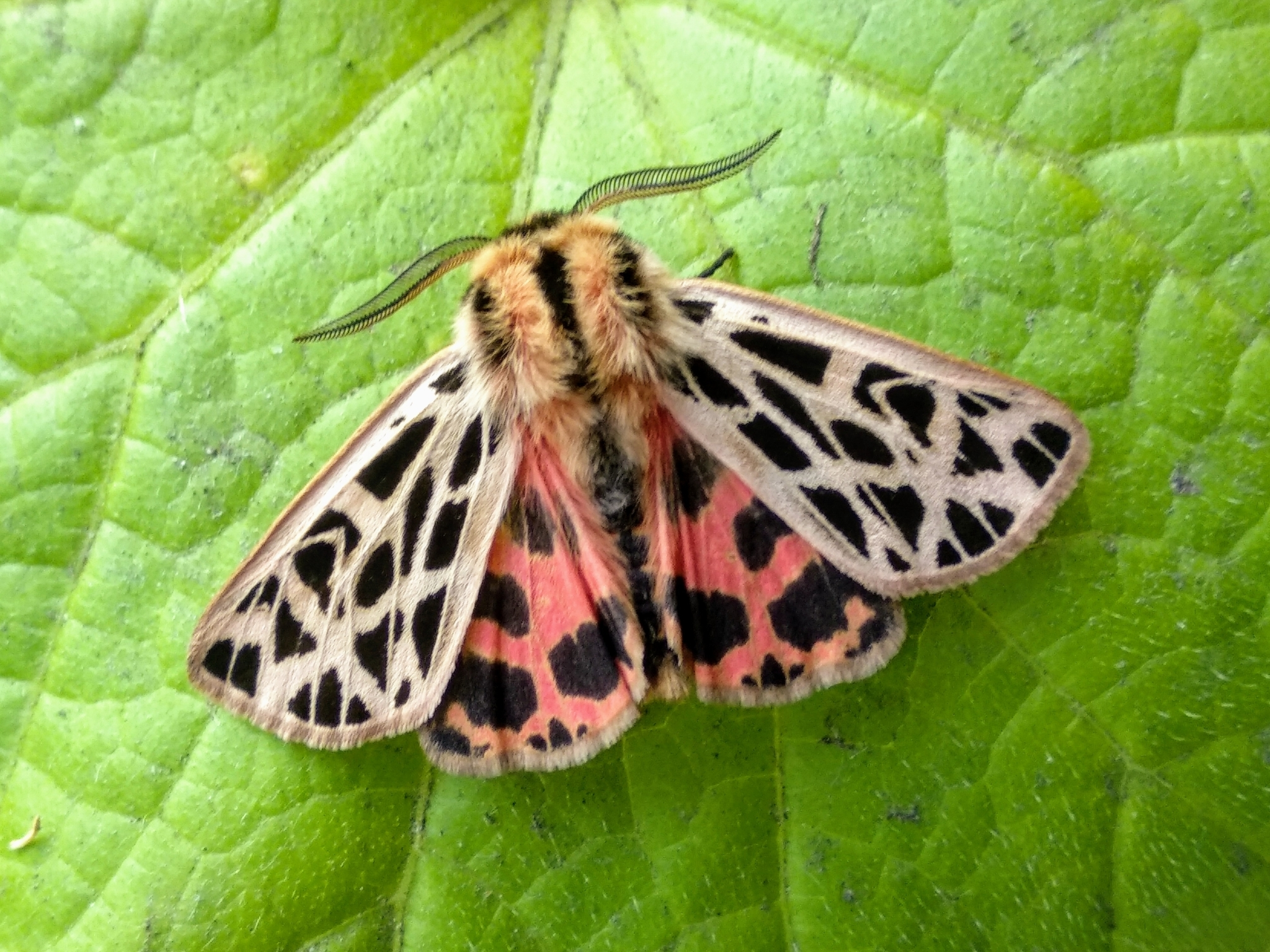
- Chelis Dahurica moth mostly found in Russia

Scientific classification
- Domain: Eukaryota
- Kingdom: Animalia
- Phylum: Arthropoda
- Class: Insecta
- Order: Lepidoptera
- Superfamily: Noctuoidea
- Family: Erebidae
- Subfamily: Arctiinae
- Genus: Chelis
- Species: C. dahurica

Binomial name
- Chelis dahurica (Boisduval, 1832)

Synonyms
- Chelonia dahurica Boisduval, 1834; Arctia gruneri Staudinger, 1867; Arctia maculosa var. sojota Tschetverikov, 1904

= Chelis dahurica =

Species of moth

Chelis dahurica is a moth in the family Erebidae. It was described by Jean Baptiste Boisduval in 1832. It is found in Russia (southern Urals, south-western Siberia, Altai, Saur, Transbaikalia) and the Mongolian steppe.

The wingspan is about 40 mm.
