= Agrisius =

Scientific classification
- Kingdom: Animalia
- Phylum: Arthropoda
- Class: Insecta
- Order: Lepidoptera
- Superfamily: Noctuoidea
- Family: Nolidae
- Subfamily: Eligminae
- Genus: Agrisius; Walker, 1855

Genus of moths

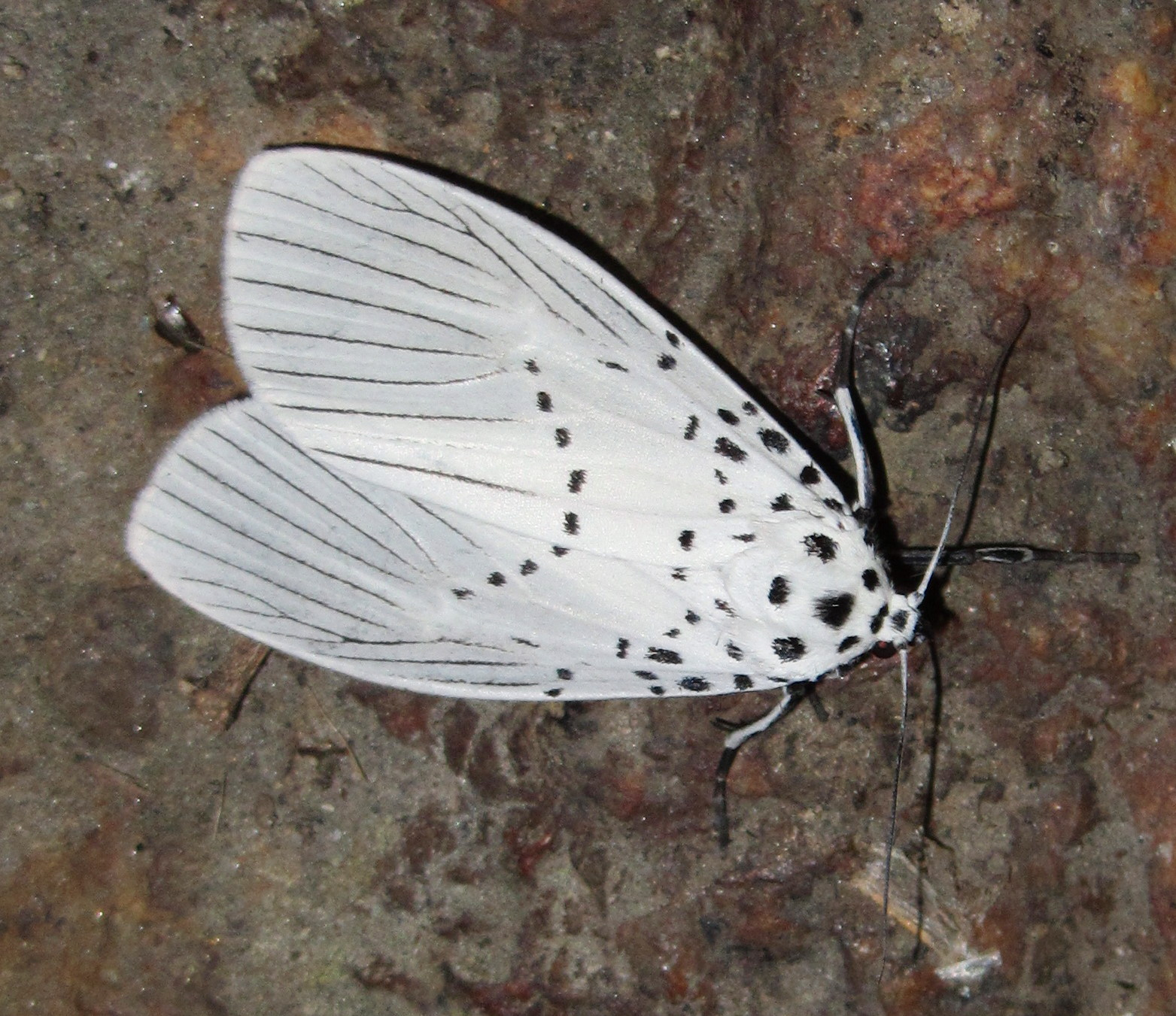
An example of Agrisius fuliginosus

Agrisius is a genus of moths in the subfamily Arctiinae.

== Species ==
- Agrisius aestivalis
- Agrisius albida
- Agrisius bolovena
- Agrisius cernyi
- Agrisius dubatolovi
- Agrisius epidela
- Agrisius excellens
- Agrisius frater
- Agrisius fuliginosus
- Agrisius guttivitta
- Agrisius kachina
- Agrisius japonicus
- Agrisius similis
- Agrisius soror
- Agrisius vernalis
- Agrisius witti
