= Chelis caecilia =

Scientific classification
- Domain: Eukaryota
- Kingdom: Animalia
- Phylum: Arthropoda
- Class: Insecta
- Order: Lepidoptera
- Superfamily: Noctuoidea
- Family: Erebidae
- Subfamily: Arctiinae
- Genus: Chelis
- Species: C. caecilia

Binomial name
- Chelis caecilia (Kindermann in Lederer, 1853)

Synonyms
- Arctia maculosa var. caecilia Kindermann in Lederer, 1853; Cletis maculosa f. insularia W.Kozhantschikov, 1924; Arctia maculosa var. slivnoensis Rebel, 1903; Arctia maculosa aumayri Huber & Stengel, 1989

Species of moth

Chelis caecilia is a moth in the family Erebidae. It was described by Kindermann in 1853. It is found in Russia (Altai, Khakasia, western Buryatia) and Mongolia.

== Subspecies ==
- Chelis caecilia caecilia
- Chelis caecilia slivnoensis (Rebel, 1903)
