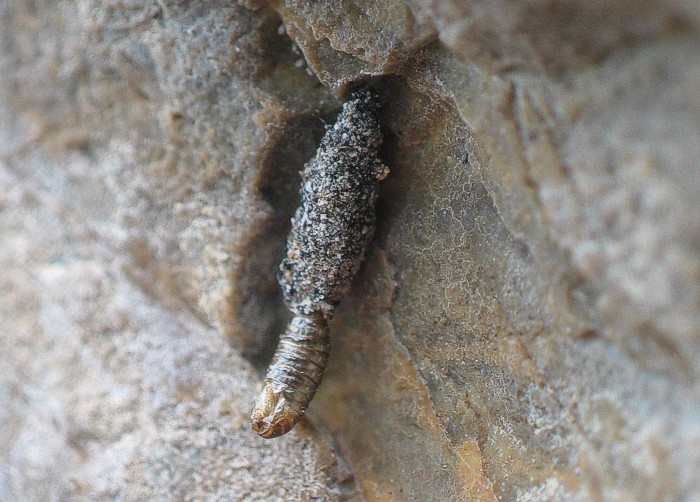

Scientific classification
- Domain: Eukaryota
- Kingdom: Animalia
- Phylum: Arthropoda
- Class: Insecta
- Order: Lepidoptera
- Family: Psychidae
- Genus: Dahlica
- Species: D. klimeschi

Binomial name
- Dahlica klimeschi (Sieder, 1953)

Synonyms
- Solenobia klimeschi Sieder, 1953

= Dahlica klimeschi =

Species of moth

Dahlica klimeschi is a moth of the Psychidae family. It is found in Switzerland and Austria.

Adults are on wing from April to June.
