= Chelis hauensteini =

Scientific classification
- Kingdom: Animalia
- Phylum: Arthropoda
- Class: Insecta
- Order: Lepidoptera
- Superfamily: Noctuoidea
- Family: Erebidae
- Subfamily: Arctiinae
- Genus: Chelis
- Species: C. hauensteini

Binomial name
- Chelis hauensteini (Kautt, 1996)

Synonyms
- Palearctia hauensteini Kautt, 1996; Palearctia glaphyra altotibetana de Freina, 1997

Species of moth

Chelis hauensteini is a moth in the family Erebidae. It was described by Peter Kautt in 1996. It is found in Tibet, China.

This species was moved from the genus Palearctia to Chelis as a result of phylogenetic research published in 2016.
