= Eospilarctia huangshanensis =

Scientific classification
- Kingdom: Animalia
- Phylum: Arthropoda
- Clade: Pancrustacea
- Class: Insecta
- Order: Lepidoptera
- Superfamily: Noctuoidea
- Family: Erebidae
- Subfamily: Arctiinae
- Genus: Eospilarctia
- Species: E. huangshanensis

Binomial name
- Eospilarctia huangshanensis Fang, 2000

Species of moth

Eospilarctia huangshanensis is a moth of the family Erebidae first described by Cheng-Lai Fang in 2000. It is found in China (Anhui and Huangshan).
