= Agrisius aestivalis =

Scientific classification
- Kingdom: Animalia
- Phylum: Arthropoda
- Class: Insecta
- Order: Lepidoptera
- Superfamily: Noctuoidea
- Family: Erebidae
- Subfamily: Arctiinae
- Genus: Agrisius
- Species: A. aestivalis

Binomial name
- Agrisius aestivalis Dubatolov, Kishida & Wang, 2012

Species of moth

Agrisius aestivalis is a moth of the subfamily Arctiinae. It is found in China (Guangdong).
