= Eospilarctia chuanxina =

Scientific classification
- Kingdom: Animalia
- Phylum: Arthropoda
- Clade: Pancrustacea
- Class: Insecta
- Order: Lepidoptera
- Superfamily: Noctuoidea
- Family: Erebidae
- Subfamily: Arctiinae
- Genus: Eospilarctia
- Species: E. chuanxina

Binomial name
- Eospilarctia chuanxina (Fang, 1982)

Synonyms
- Spilarctia chuanxina Fang, 1982

Species of moth

Eospilarctia chuanxina is a moth of the family Erebidae first described by Cheng-Lai Fang in 1982. It is found in Sichuan, China.
