= Chelis rasa =

Scientific classification
- Kingdom: Animalia
- Phylum: Arthropoda
- Clade: Pancrustacea
- Class: Insecta
- Order: Lepidoptera
- Superfamily: Noctuoidea
- Family: Erebidae
- Subfamily: Arctiinae
- Genus: Chelis
- Species: C. rasa

Binomial name
- Chelis rasa (Saldaitis, Ivinskis & Churkin, 2000)

Synonyms
- Palearctia rasa Saldaitis, Ivinskis & Churkin, 2000

Species of moth

Chelis rasa is a moth in the family Erebidae. It was described by Saldaitis, Ivinskis and Churkin in 2000. It is found in China (Xinjiang: the Karlik Mountains).

This species was moved from the genus Palearctia to Chelis as a result of phylogenetic research published in 2016.
