= Agrisius albida =

Scientific classification
- Domain: Eukaryota
- Kingdom: Animalia
- Phylum: Arthropoda
- Class: Insecta
- Order: Lepidoptera
- Superfamily: Noctuoidea
- Family: Erebidae
- Subfamily: Arctiinae
- Genus: Agrisius
- Species: A. albida

Binomial name
- Agrisius albida Daniel, 1952

Synonyms
- Agrisius fuliginosus albida

Species of moth

Agrisius albida is a moth of the subfamily Arctiinae. It is found in China (Jiangsu).
