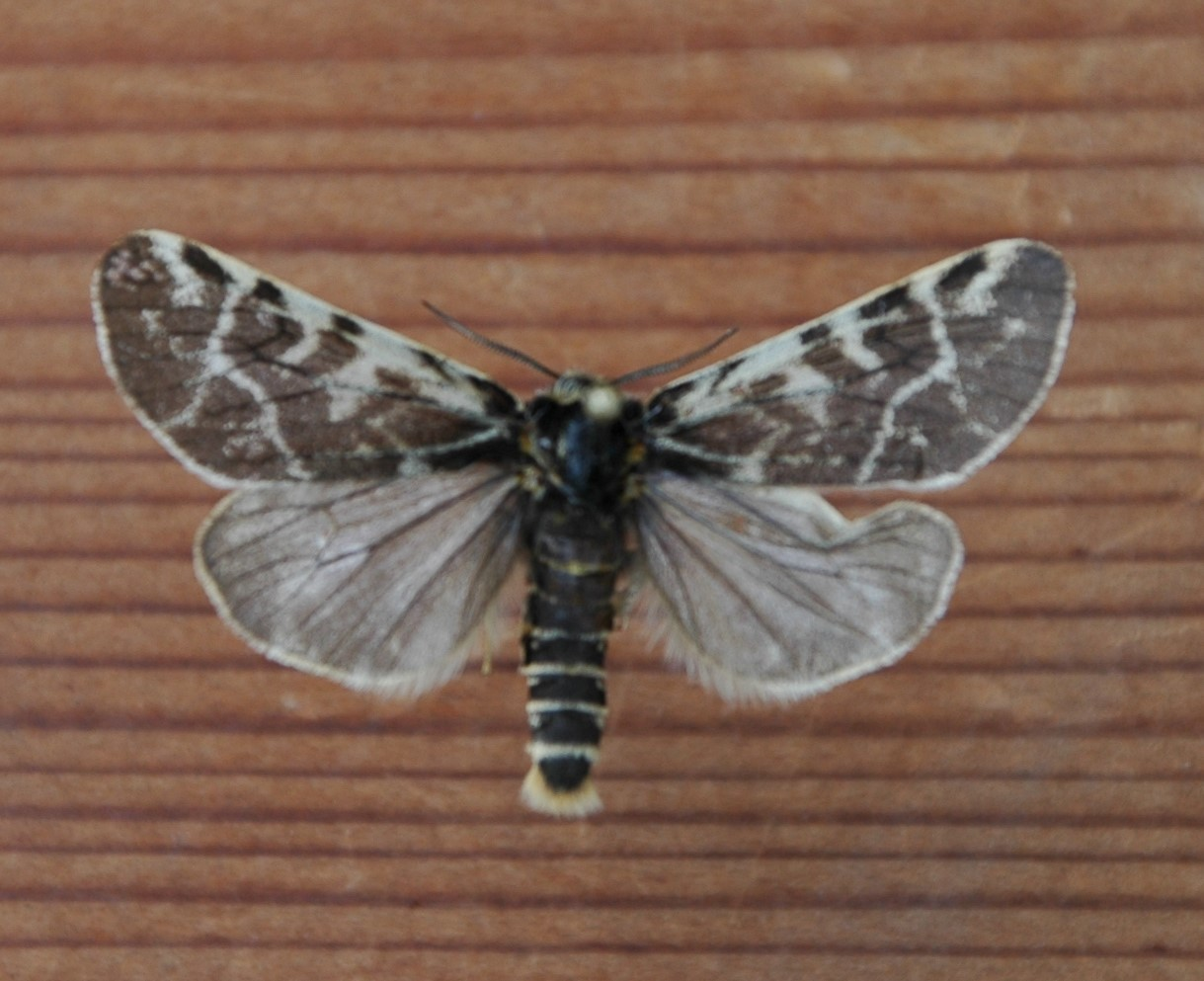

Conservation status
- Imperiled (NatureServe)

Scientific classification
- Kingdom: Animalia
- Phylum: Arthropoda
- Class: Insecta
- Order: Lepidoptera
- Superfamily: Noctuoidea
- Family: Erebidae
- Subfamily: Arctiinae
- Genus: Chelis
- Species: C. sordida

Binomial name
- Chelis sordida (McDunnough, 1921)

Synonyms
- Holoarctia sordida (McDunnough, 1921); Neoarctia sordida McDunnough, 1921

= Chelis sordida =

Species of moth

Chelis sordida is a species of moth in the family Erebidae. It was first described by James Halliday McDunnough in 1921. It is found in the mountains of Alberta and British Columbia and possibly Yukon and Alaska. The habitat consists of dry rocky alpine tundra.

The length of the forewings is 15–16 mm. Adults are on wing from July to mid-August.

This species was formerly a member of the genus Holoarctia, but was moved to Chelis along with the other species of the genera Holoarctia, Neoarctia, and Hyperborea.
