= Agrisius guttivitta =

Scientific classification
- Kingdom: Animalia
- Phylum: Arthropoda
- Class: Insecta
- Order: Lepidoptera
- Superfamily: Noctuoidea
- Family: Nolidae
- Genus: Agrisius
- Species: A. guttivitta

Binomial name
- Agrisius guttivitta Walker, 1855

Species of moth

Agrisius guttivitta is a moth of the subfamily Arctiinae first described by Francis Walker in 1855. It is found in Sikkim, India.
