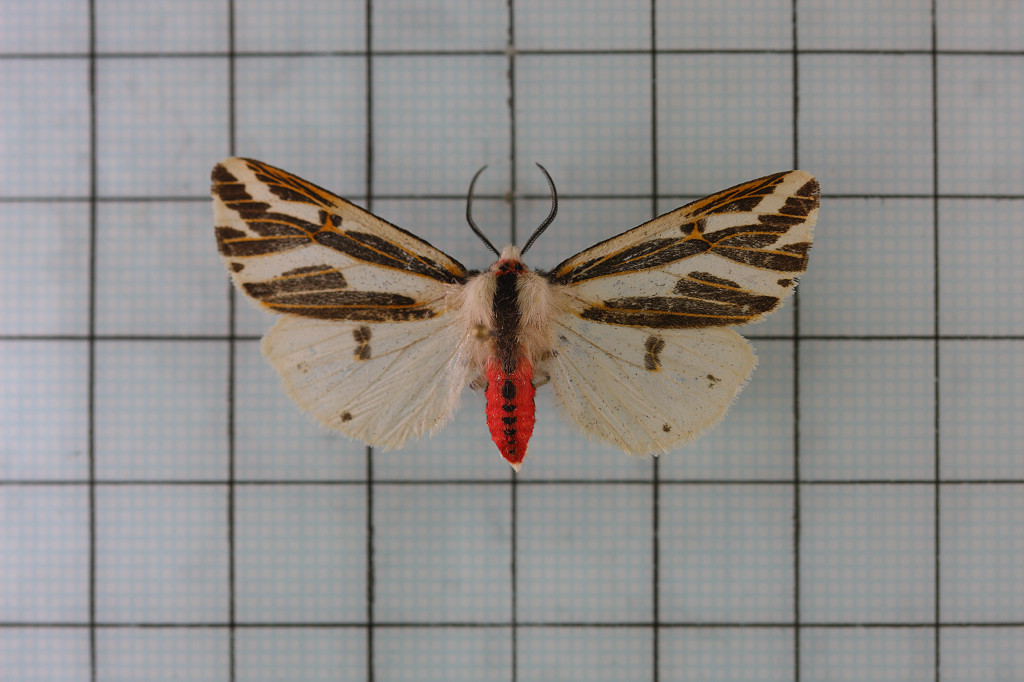

Scientific classification
- Domain: Eukaryota
- Kingdom: Animalia
- Phylum: Arthropoda
- Class: Insecta
- Order: Lepidoptera
- Superfamily: Noctuoidea
- Family: Erebidae
- Subfamily: Arctiinae
- Genus: Eospilarctia
- Species: E. lewisii

Binomial name
- Eospilarctia lewisii (Butler, 1885)

Synonyms
- Seirarctia lewisi Butler, 1885; Diacrisia lewisi

= Eospilarctia lewisii =

Species of moth

Eospilarctia lewisii is a species of moth in the family Erebidae first described by Arthur Gardiner Butler in 1885. It is found on the Japanese islands of Honshu, Shikoku, Kyushu and Tsushima.
