= Seydelia geometrica =

Scientific classification
- Domain: Eukaryota
- Kingdom: Animalia
- Phylum: Arthropoda
- Class: Insecta
- Order: Lepidoptera
- Superfamily: Noctuoidea
- Family: Erebidae
- Subfamily: Arctiinae
- Genus: Seydelia
- Species: S. geometrica

Binomial name
- Seydelia geometrica (Oberthür, 1883)

Synonyms
- Chelonia geometrica Oberthür, 1883; Pericallia geometrica ab. intermedia Berio, 1941

Species of moth

Seydelia geometrica is a moth in the family Erebidae. It was described by Oberthür in 1883. It is found in Eritrea and Ethiopia.
