= Eospilarctia taliensis =

Scientific classification
- Domain: Eukaryota
- Kingdom: Animalia
- Phylum: Arthropoda
- Class: Insecta
- Order: Lepidoptera
- Superfamily: Noctuoidea
- Family: Erebidae
- Subfamily: Arctiinae
- Genus: Eospilarctia
- Species: E. taliensis

Binomial name
- Eospilarctia taliensis (Rothschild, 1933)

Synonyms
- Spilosoma taliensis Rothschild, 1933; Spilarctia jordansi Daniel, 1943

Species of moth

Eospilarctia taliensis is a moth of the family Erebidae first described by Walter Rothschild in 1933. It is found in the Chinese provinces of Yunnan, Sichuan and Shaanxi.
