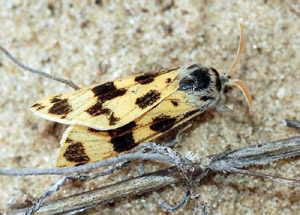
- Male

Scientific classification
- Kingdom: Animalia
- Phylum: Arthropoda
- Class: Insecta
- Order: Lepidoptera
- Superfamily: Noctuoidea
- Family: Erebidae
- Subfamily: Arctiinae
- Genus: Chelis
- Species: C. pardalina

Binomial name
- Chelis pardalina (Püngeler, 1898)

Synonyms
- Tancrea pardalina Püngeler, 1898; Ocnogyna pardalina

= Chelis pardalina =

Genus of moths

Chelis pardalina is a species of tiger moth genus in the family Erebidae, known from deserts in Central Asia: Kara-Kum, Ustyurt and Sary-Kum. The species was first described by Rudolf Püngeler in 1898. Females are brachypterous.

This species was previously the sole member of the genus Tancrea, but was moved to Chelis along with the species of six other genera as a result of phylogenetic research published in 2016.
