= Dahlica triquetrella =

Species of moth

The Narrow Lichen Bagworm (Dahlica triquetrella) is a bagworm moth in the family Psychidae. The species occurs in both sexes, diploid and tetraploid parthenogenetic forms.

== Description ==
=== Moth ===
The adults are characterized by distinctive sexual dimorphism. The wings of males are long and narrow and have short fringes along the edges of their wings. They have a wingspan of 9 to 13 millimeters, are gray-brown in color, and have many whitish spots. Females resemble maggots, are brownish in color, have a very small head, a cylindrical body, and a tuft of whitish-gray fur on their abdomen. They lack wings but have well-developed legs.

=== Caterpillar ===
The caterpillars are yellowish in color, have a dark amber head and thorax. They spin themselves into a sack-like burrow. The burrow is distinctively triangular, about 4 to 6 millimeters long, tapers in at both ends with the ventral side being flat. The caterpillar attaches tiny plant particles and grains of sand to the outside. Particularly characteristic, is the attachment of small chitin fragments from other insects, particularly to the front part of the burrow.

== Range and Distribution ==
Isolated populations of both sexes exist in parts of the Alps and the Swiss Jura, on mountain peaks that remind unfrozen during the Riss and Würm glaciations, in the Reichswald near Nuremberg, in the Danube Valley between Passau and Linz, the Adelegg, and high altitudes near Trieste. Parthenogenetic populations are distributed from England eastward through Central and Eastern Europe, including the Alps, to Russia, as well as in isolated populations in many regions of Northern, Western, and Southern Europe. They inhabit a wide variety of habitats, including deciduous and coniferous forests, shrublands, and rocky slopes.

== Lifecycle ==
During the entirety of its larval stage, the caterpillar remains in its protective shell and pupates there. The male moths emerge from their sac and seek out the flightless female, who sits outside the sac tube, to mate. Both sexes have a very short lifespan, often only a few hours. Parthenogenetic females begin laying eggs shortly after hatching. The caterpillars preferentially feed on the lichen species Lepraria incana. Their sacs are attached to trunks, posts, and walls at a height of usually one to two meters.

In southern Germany, caterpillars have been observed migrating with their sacs up the trunks of trees, in this case plane trees, in the early second half of February and then pupate in their sacs. After about three weeks, the pupa emerges from one end of the sac, and the adult subsequently leaves.

== Conservation ==
The population that has both sexes is found only in Bavaria and Baden-Württemberg in Germany and is classified as a geographically restricted species on the Red List of Threatened Species. The parthenogenetic form is common in some areas and is not considered endangered.

Dahlica triquetrella
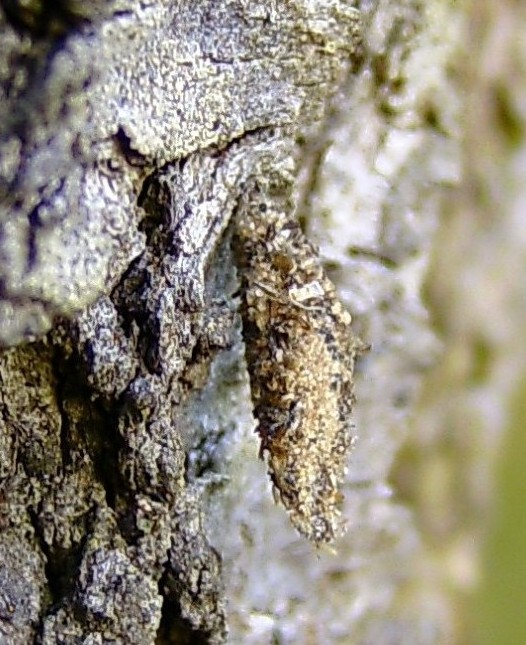
- Case

Scientific classification
- Kingdom: Animalia
- Phylum: Arthropoda
- Class: Insecta
- Order: Lepidoptera
- Family: Psychidae
- Genus: Dahlica
- Species: D. triquetrella

Binomial name
- Dahlica triquetrella (Hübner, 1813)

Synonyms
- Solenobia triquetrella

== Gallery ==
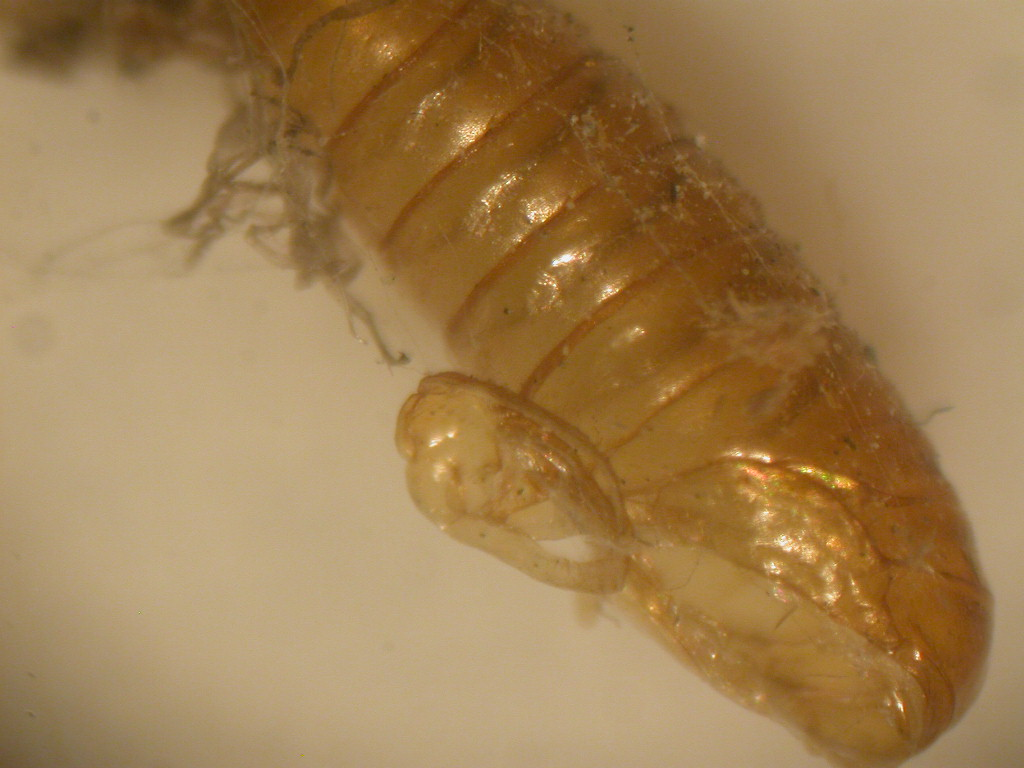
pupal case

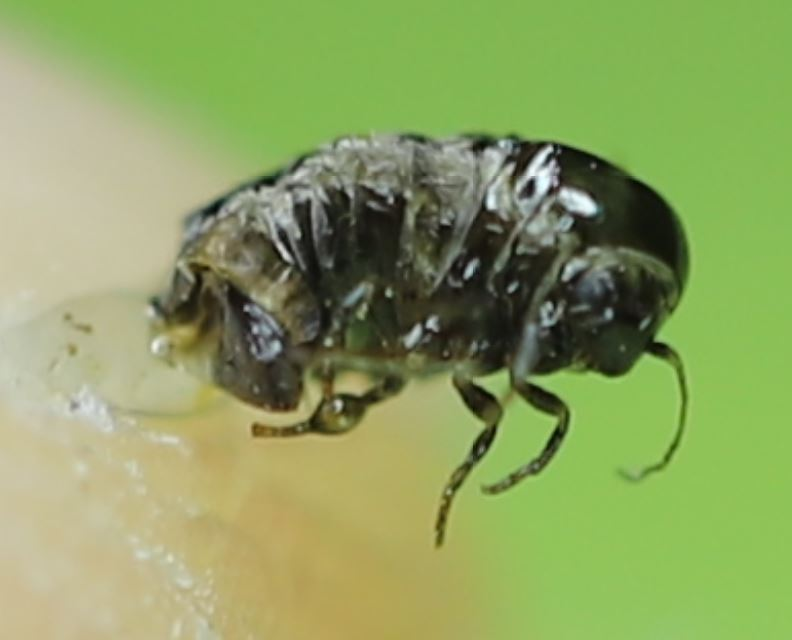
female imago
