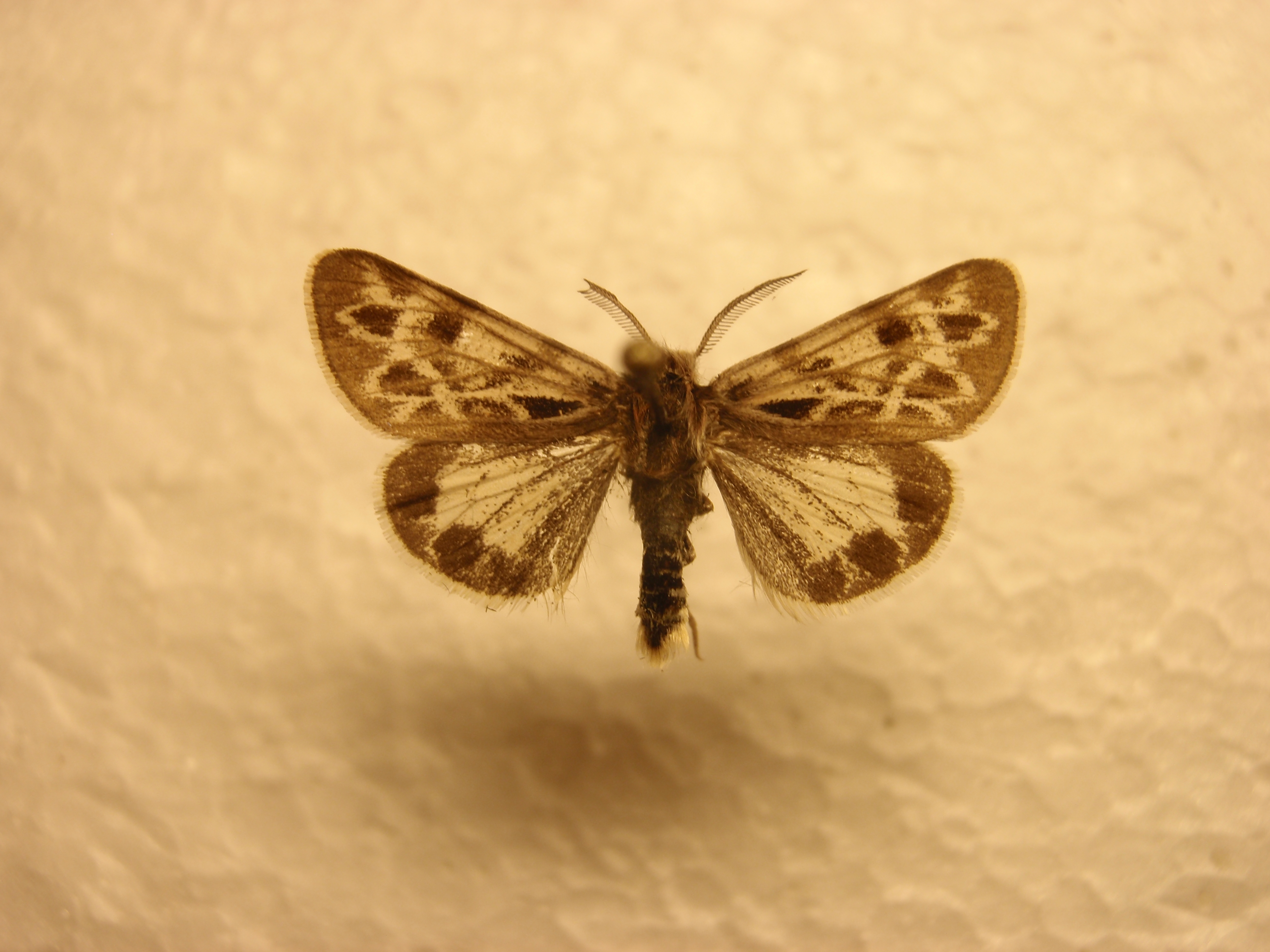

Scientific classification
- Kingdom: Animalia
- Phylum: Arthropoda
- Class: Insecta
- Order: Lepidoptera
- Superfamily: Noctuoidea
- Family: Erebidae
- Subfamily: Arctiinae
- Genus: Chelis
- Species: C. gratiosa

Binomial name
- Chelis gratiosa (Grum-Grshimailo, 1890)

Synonyms
- Palearctia gratiosa (Grum-Grshimailo, 1890); Arctia glaphyra var. gratiosa Grum-Grshimailo, 1890; Palearctia kashmirica Ferguson, 1985; Micrarctia glaphyra ab. nebulosa Reich, 1932; Ocnogyna postflavida Hampson, 1894; Palearctia postflavida; Arctia rupicola Grum-Grshimailo, 1890; Arctia glauca Staudinger, 1891 [1892]; Palearctia sarycola de Freina, 1997; Micrarctia lochmatteri Reich, 1933

= Chelis gratiosa =

Species of moth

Chelis gratiosa is a moth in the family Erebidae. It was described by Grigory Grum-Grshimailo in 1890. It is found in the western Tien Shan, the Pamir-Alay, Kyrgyzstan, Turkestan, Hissar, Trans-Alai, the Pamir Mountains, Pakistan, Kashmir and western China.

This species was moved from the genus Palearctia to Chelis as a result of phylogenetic research published in 2016.

== Subspecies ==
- Chelis gratiosa gratiosa (Alai, Tajikistan, north-western Pamirs)
- Chelis gratiosa caroli Dubatolov, 1996 (Chatkal, Kirghizskii Alatau)
- Chelis gratiosa flavoala Dubatolov, 1996 (Zeravshan, Turkestan, mountain ranges of Hissar)
- Chelis gratiosa kashmirica Ferguson, 1985 (Kashmir)
- Chelis gratiosa lochmatteri (Reich, 1933) (Pakistan: Karakorum)
- Chelis gratiosa postflavida (Hampson, 1894) (Kashmir)
- Chelis gratiosa rupicola (Grum-Grshimailo, 1890) (eastern Trans-Alai, eastern and south-western Pamirs)
- Chelis gratiosa sarezica Dubatolov & Gurko, 2003 (Tajikistan)
- Chelis gratiosa sarycola de Freina, 1997 (Sarykol Mountains)
- Chelis gratiosa sergei Dubatolov, 1996 (south-eastern Terskei Alatau)
