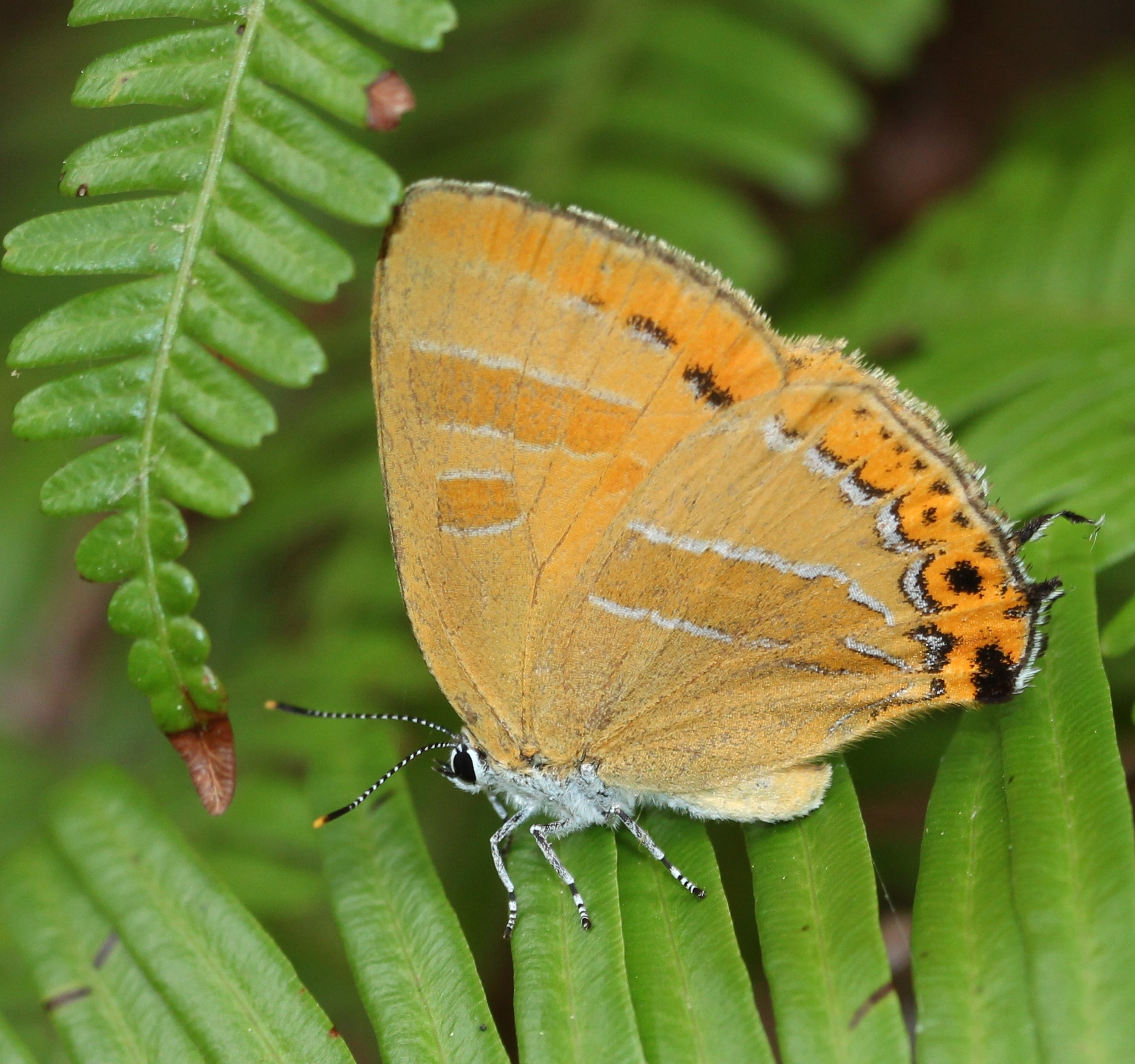
- Japonica lutea

Scientific classification
- Kingdom: Animalia
- Phylum: Arthropoda
- Class: Insecta
- Order: Lepidoptera
- Family: Lycaenidae
- Tribe: Theclini
- Genus: Japonica; Tutt, 1907

Species
- See text

= Japonica (butterfly) =

Butterfly genus in family Lycaenidae

Japonica is an East Palearctic genus of butterfly in the family Lycaenidae.

== Species ==
- Japonica bella Hsu, 1997.
  - Japonica bella lao Koiwaya, 2000 North Laos.
  - Japonica bella myanmarensis Koiwaya, 2000 Burma.
- Japonica lutea (Hewitson, 1865) North China and Korea.
  - Japonica lutea lutea Japan.
  - Japonica lutea adusta (Riley, 1939) Sichuan, East Tibet
  - Japonica lutea dubatolovi Fujioka, 1993 Amur Oblast, Ussuri.
  - Japonica lutea gansuensis Murayama, 1991
  - Japonica lutea patungkoanui Murayama, 1956 Taiwan.
  - Japonica lutea tatsienluica (Riley, 1939) Sichuan.
- Japonica onoi Murayama, 1953 Japan and Korea.
  - Japonica onoi onoi South Ussuri, Japan.
  - Japonica onoi mizobei (Saigusa, 1993) Honshu
- Japonica saepestriata (Hewitson, 1865) Northeast China, Korea and Japan.
  - Japonica saepestriata saepestriata Ussuri, Japan.
  - Japonica saepestriata gotohi Saigusa, 1993 Honshu.
  - Japonica saepestriata takenakakazuoi Fujioka, 1993 Central China.
