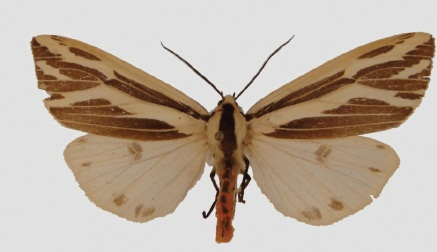
- Female
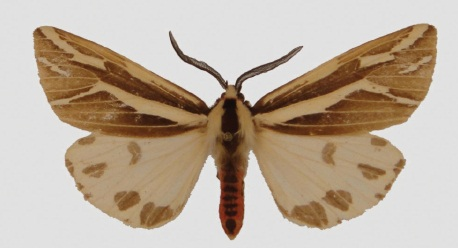
- Male

Scientific classification
- Kingdom: Animalia
- Phylum: Arthropoda
- Clade: Pancrustacea
- Class: Insecta
- Order: Lepidoptera
- Superfamily: Noctuoidea
- Family: Erebidae
- Subfamily: Arctiinae
- Genus: Eospilarctia
- Species: E. naumanni

Binomial name
- Eospilarctia naumanni Saldaitis et al., 2012

= Eospilarctia naumanni =

Species of moth

Eospilarctia naumanni is a moth of the family Erebidae first described by Aidas Saldaitis, Povilas Ivinskis, Thomas Witt and Oleg Pekarsky in 2012. It is found in the Kachin region of northern Myanmar.
