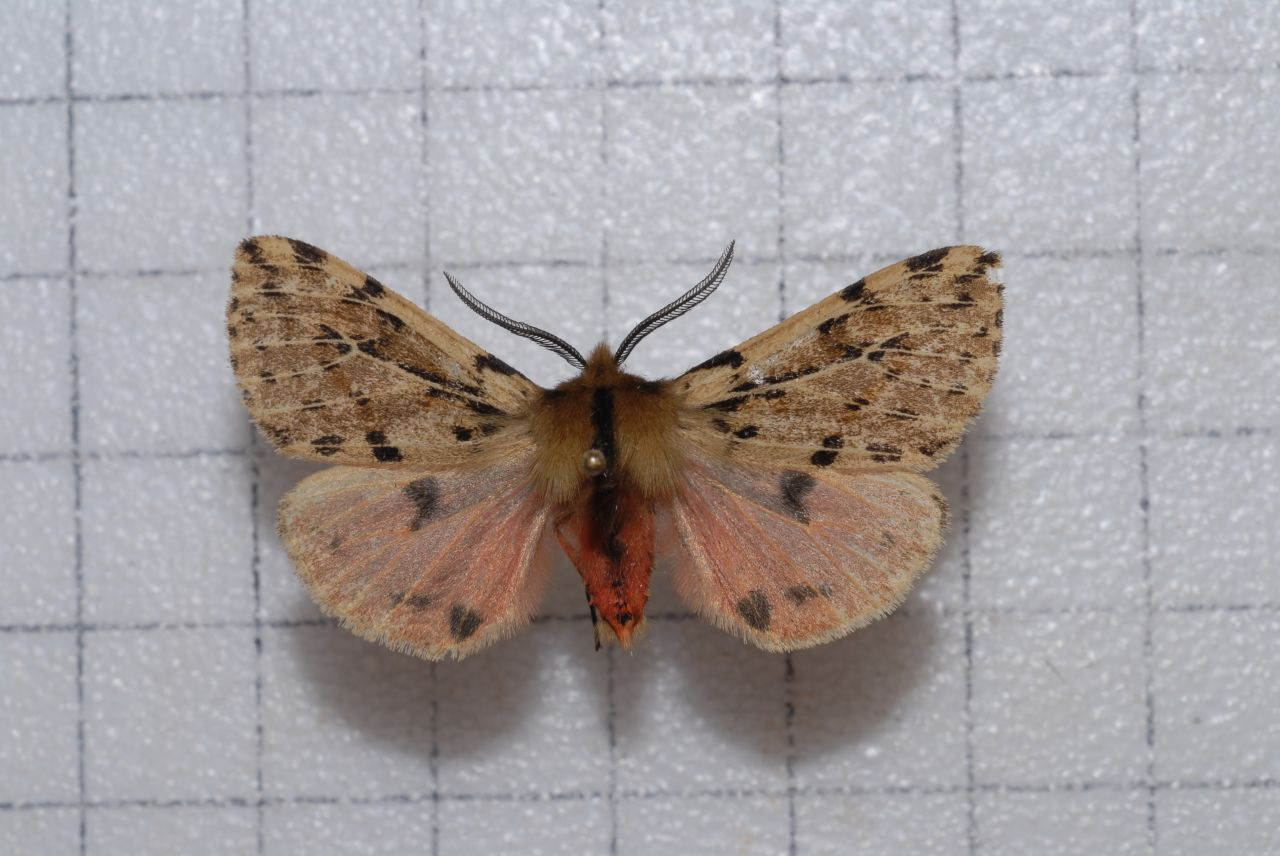

Scientific classification
- Kingdom: Animalia
- Phylum: Arthropoda
- Class: Insecta
- Order: Lepidoptera
- Superfamily: Noctuoidea
- Family: Erebidae
- Subfamily: Arctiinae
- Genus: Eospilarctia
- Species: E. neurographa

Binomial name
- Eospilarctia neurographa (Hampson, 1909)

Synonyms
- Diacrisia neurographa Hampson, 1909

= Eospilarctia neurographa =

Species of moth

Eospilarctia neurographa is a moth in the family Erebidae first described by George Hampson in 1909. It is found in Taiwan.

The wingspan is 38–42 mm.
