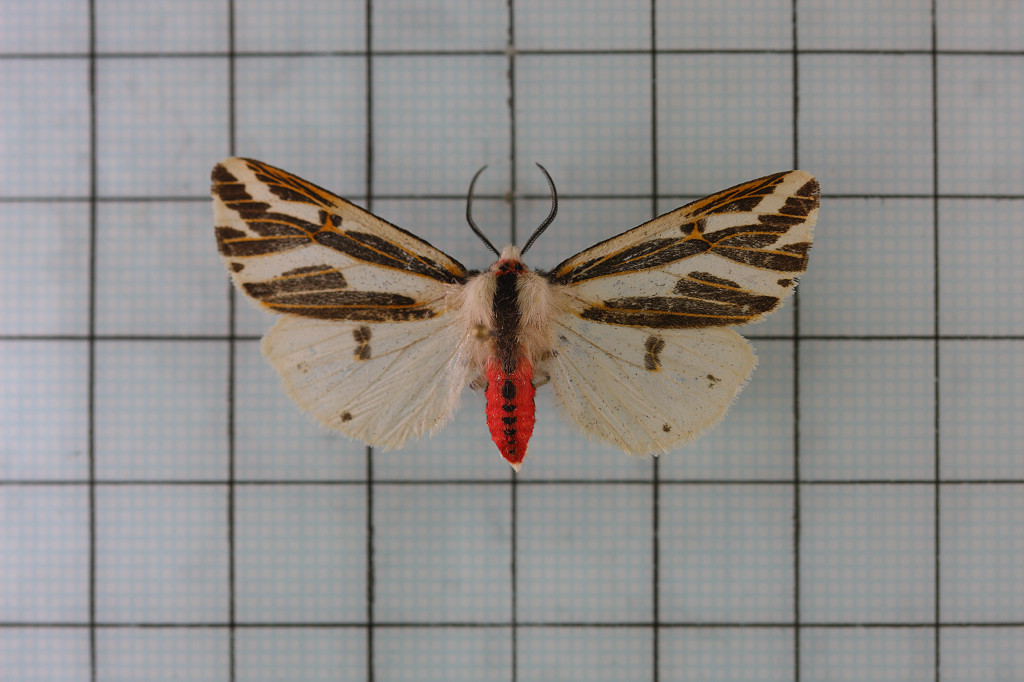

Scientific classification
- Domain: Eukaryota
- Kingdom: Animalia
- Phylum: Arthropoda
- Class: Insecta
- Order: Lepidoptera
- Superfamily: Noctuoidea
- Family: Erebidae
- Subfamily: Arctiinae
- Genus: Eospilarctia
- Species: E. formosana

Binomial name
- Eospilarctia formosana (Rothschild, 1933)

Synonyms
- Eospilarctia lewisii formosana

= Eospilarctia formosana =

Species of moth

Eospilarctia formosana is a moth of the family Erebidae. It is found in Taiwan.
