= Chelis kashmirica =

Scientific classification
- Kingdom: Animalia
- Phylum: Arthropoda
- Class: Insecta
- Order: Lepidoptera
- Superfamily: Noctuoidea
- Family: Erebidae
- Subfamily: Arctiinae
- Tribe: Arctiini
- Subtribe: Arctiina
- Genus: Chelis
- Species: C. kashmirica

Binomial name
- Chelis kashmirica (Ferguson, 1985)

Synonyms
- Palearctia kashmirica Ferguson, 1985 Palearctia gratiosa Grum-Grshimailo, 1890

Species of moth

Chelis kashmirica is a species of tiger moth in the family Erebidae. It was formerly a member of the genus Palearctia.
