= Agrisius similis =

Scientific classification
- Kingdom: Animalia
- Phylum: Arthropoda
- Clade: Pancrustacea
- Class: Insecta
- Order: Lepidoptera
- Superfamily: Noctuoidea
- Family: Nolidae
- Genus: Agrisius
- Species: A. similis

Binomial name
- Agrisius similis C.L. Fang, 1991

Species of moth

Agrisius similis is a moth of the subfamily Arctiinae. It is found in China (Yunnan).
