= Agrisius fuliginosus =

Scientific classification
- Domain: Eukaryota
- Kingdom: Animalia
- Phylum: Arthropoda
- Class: Insecta
- Order: Lepidoptera
- Superfamily: Noctuoidea
- Family: Erebidae
- Subfamily: Arctiinae
- Genus: Agrisius
- Species: A. fuliginosus

Binomial name
- Agrisius fuliginosus Moore, 1872

Synonyms
- Agrisius japonicus Leech, 1888

Species of moth

Agrisius fuliginosus is a moth of the subfamily Arctiinae. It is found in Japan, China and India.
