= Seydelia turlini =

Scientific classification
- Kingdom: Animalia
- Phylum: Arthropoda
- Class: Insecta
- Order: Lepidoptera
- Superfamily: Noctuoidea
- Family: Erebidae
- Subfamily: Arctiinae
- Genus: Seydelia
- Species: S. turlini

Binomial name
- Seydelia turlini Toulgoët, 1976

Species of moth

Seydelia turlini is a moth in the family Erebidae. It was described by Hervé de Toulgoët in 1976. It is found in the Democratic Republic of the Congo and Rwanda.

== Subspecies ==
- Seydelia turlini turlini (Rwanda)
- Seydelia turlini celsicola Toulgoët, 1976 (Rwanda, Democratic Republic of the Congo: Orientale)
