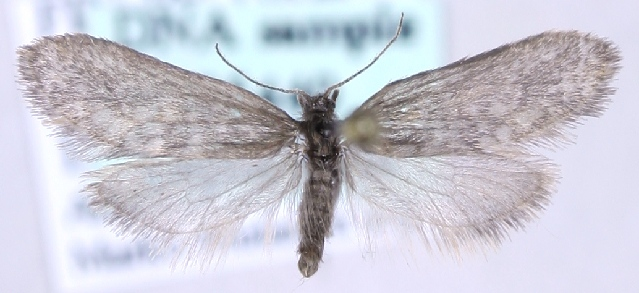

Scientific classification
- Domain: Eukaryota
- Kingdom: Animalia
- Phylum: Arthropoda
- Class: Insecta
- Order: Lepidoptera
- Family: Psychidae
- Genus: Dahlica
- Species: D. lazuri

Binomial name
- Dahlica lazuri (Clerck, 1759)

Synonyms
- Tinea lazuri Clerck, 1759; Solenobia fumosella Heinemann, 1870

= Dahlica lazuri =

Species of moth

Dahlica lazuri is a moth of the family Psychidae. It was described by Carl Alexander Clerck in 1759. It is found in France, the Benelux, Germany, Switzerland, Austria, the Baltic region, Scandinavia and Russia.

The wingspan is 6–15 mm. Adults have been recorded on wing from April to June.
