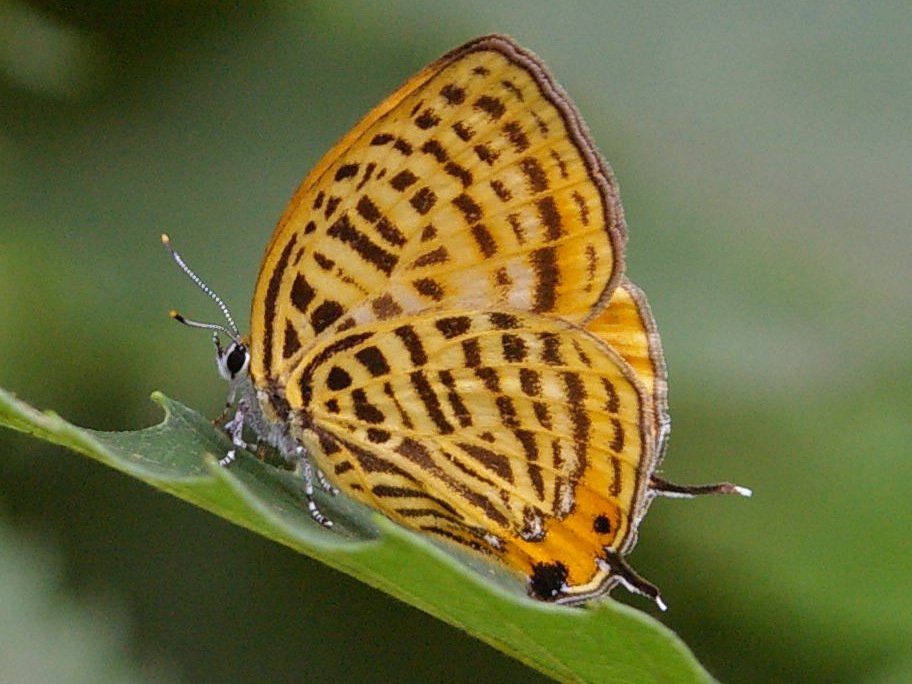

Scientific classification
- Kingdom: Animalia
- Phylum: Arthropoda
- Class: Insecta
- Order: Lepidoptera
- Family: Lycaenidae
- Genus: Japonica
- Species: J. saepestriata

Binomial name
- Japonica saepestriata Hewitson, 1865

= Japonica saepestriata =

Species of butterfly

Japonica saepestriata is a Theclinae butterfly found in woods of eastern Asia, especially Japan. It is single brooded and appears in early summer.

Food plant — Quercus mongolica.

== Subspecies ==
- Japonica saepestriata saepestriata Ussuri, Japan.
- Japonica saepestriata gotohi Saigusa, 1993 Honshu.
- Japonica saepestriata takenakakazuoi Fujioka, 1993 Central China.
