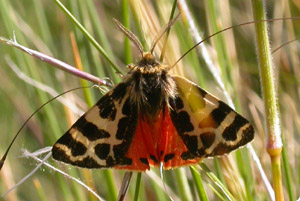

Scientific classification
- Kingdom: Animalia
- Phylum: Arthropoda
- Class: Insecta
- Order: Lepidoptera
- Superfamily: Noctuoidea
- Family: Erebidae
- Subfamily: Arctiinae
- Genus: Chelis
- Species: C. erschoffii

Binomial name
- Chelis erschoffii (Alphéraky, 1882)

Synonyms
- Palearctia erschoffii (Alphéraky, 1882); Arctia erschoffii Alphéraky, 1882; Arctia erschoffii erschoffii; Arctia erschoffii issyka Staudinger, 1887; Micrarctia kindermanni korlana O.Bang-Haas, 1927; Arctia erschoffii selmonsi Böttcher, 1905

= Chelis erschoffii =

Species of moth

Chelis erschoffii is a moth in the family Erebidae. It was described by Sergei Alphéraky in 1882. It is found in Central Asia (Chatkal, Sussamyr, Kirghizskii Alatau, Kungei Alatau, Terskei Alatau, Nary, Sarydzhaz, Trans-Ili, Xinjiang, Julduz).

This species was moved from the genus Palearctia to Chelis as a result of phylogenetic research published in 2016.

== Subspecies ==
- Chelis erschoffii erschoffii (Tien Shan)
- Chelis erschoffii miranda Plustsch & Dolin, 2000 (Kyrgyzstan)
- Chelis erschoffii sarydzhasica Plustsch & Dolin, 2000 (Kyrgyzstan)
- Chelis erschoffii selmonsi (Böttcher, 1905) (Inner Tien Shan)
