= Chelis wagneri =

Scientific classification
- Kingdom: Animalia
- Phylum: Arthropoda
- Clade: Pancrustacea
- Class: Insecta
- Order: Lepidoptera
- Superfamily: Noctuoidea
- Family: Erebidae
- Subfamily: Arctiinae
- Genus: Chelis
- Species: C. wagneri

Binomial name
- Chelis wagneri (Püngeler in Wagner, 1918)

Synonyms
- Palearctia wagneri (Püngeler, 1918); Arctia wagneri Püngeler, 1918

Species of moth

Chelis wagneri is a moth in the family Erebidae. It was described by Püngeler in 1918. It is found in central Tien Shan, a mountain range in Central Asia.

This species was moved from the genus Palearctia to Chelis as a result of phylogenetic research published in 2016.
