= Dahlica fennicella =

Scientific classification
- Domain: Eukaryota
- Kingdom: Animalia
- Phylum: Arthropoda
- Class: Insecta
- Order: Lepidoptera
- Family: Psychidae
- Subfamily: Naryciinae
- Tribe: Dahlicini
- Genus: Dahlica
- Species: D. fennicella

Binomial name
- Dahlica fennicella (Suomalainen, 1980)

Species of moth

Dahlica fennicella is a species of moth, belonging to the genus Dahlica.

It is native to Northern Europe.
