= Chelis mustangbhoti =

Scientific classification
- Kingdom: Animalia
- Phylum: Arthropoda
- Class: Insecta
- Order: Lepidoptera
- Superfamily: Noctuoidea
- Family: Erebidae
- Subfamily: Arctiinae
- Genus: Chelis
- Species: C. mustangbhoti

Binomial name
- Chelis mustangbhoti (Daniel, 1961)

Synonyms
- Palearctia mustangbhoti (Daniel, 1961); Micrarctia mustangbhoti Daniel, 1961

Species of moth

Chelis mustangbhoti is a moth in the family Erebidae. It was described by Franz Daniel in 1961. It is found in Nepal.

This species was moved from the genus Palearctia to Chelis as a result of phylogenetic research published in 2016.
