= Chelis czekanowskii =

Scientific classification
- Kingdom: Animalia
- Phylum: Arthropoda
- Clade: Pancrustacea
- Class: Insecta
- Order: Lepidoptera
- Superfamily: Noctuoidea
- Family: Erebidae
- Subfamily: Arctiinae
- Genus: Chelis; Grum-Grshimailo, 1900
- Species: C. czekanowskii

Binomial name
- Chelis czekanowskii (Grum-Grshimailo, 1900)

Synonyms
- Hyperborea czekanowskii Grum-Grshimailo, 1900; Hyperborea czecanousci Hampson, 1920

Species of moth

Chelis czekanowskii is a species of tiger moth in the family Erebidae. The females are brachypterous (have reduced wings). It is found in the Russian Far East (Nzhnyaya Tunguska river, northern Yakutia, Kolyma river, Koryakia, Chukotka, Kamchatka, Stanovoi, Udokan) and Alaska. The species was first described by Grigory Grum-Grshimailo in 1900.

The wingspan is about 37 mm.

This species was formerly a member of the genus Hyperborea, but was moved to Chelis along with the species of the genera Holoarctia and Neoarctia.
