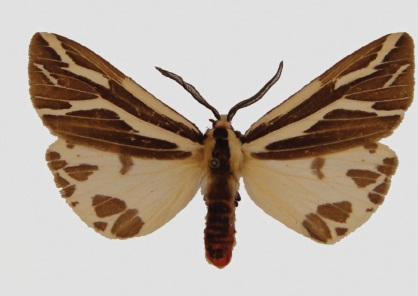
- Male

Scientific classification
- Kingdom: Animalia
- Phylum: Arthropoda
- Clade: Pancrustacea
- Class: Insecta
- Order: Lepidoptera
- Superfamily: Noctuoidea
- Family: Erebidae
- Subfamily: Arctiinae
- Genus: Eospilarctia
- Species: E. maciai

Binomial name
- Eospilarctia maciai Saldaitis et al., 2012

= Eospilarctia maciai =

Species of moth

Eospilarctia maciai is a moth of the family Erebidae first described by Aidas Saldaitis, Povilas Ivinskis, Thomas Witt and Oleg Pekarsky in 2012. It is found in the Fengshuiuiny Shan Mountains in the Yunnan province in south-western China.

The wingspan is about 50 mm. The ground color of the forewings is dark blackish brown and the veins are yellow. The hindwings are whitish yellow with brown patches.

== Etymology ==
The species is named after Mr Ramon Macià Vilà, an Arctiinae specialist.
