= Agrisius dubatolovi =

Scientific classification
- Domain: Eukaryota
- Kingdom: Animalia
- Phylum: Arthropoda
- Class: Insecta
- Order: Lepidoptera
- Superfamily: Noctuoidea
- Family: Erebidae
- Subfamily: Arctiinae
- Genus: Agrisius
- Species: A. dubatolovi

Binomial name
- Agrisius dubatolovi Orhant, 2012

Species of moth

Agrisius dubatolovi is a moth of the subfamily Arctiinae. It is found in Thailand.
