= Afrojavanica melaenoides =

Scientific classification
- Domain: Eukaryota
- Kingdom: Animalia
- Phylum: Arthropoda
- Class: Insecta
- Order: Lepidoptera
- Superfamily: Noctuoidea
- Family: Erebidae
- Subfamily: Arctiinae
- Genus: Afrojavanica
- Species: A. melaenoides

Binomial name
- Afrojavanica melaenoides (Rothschild, 1935)

Synonyms
- Spilosoma melaenoides Rothschild, 1935; Seydelia melaenoides

Species of moth

Afrojavanica melaenoides is a moth in the family Erebidae. It was described by Rothschild in 1935. It is found on Java.
