= Afrojavanica melaena =

Scientific classification
- Kingdom: Animalia
- Phylum: Arthropoda
- Class: Insecta
- Order: Lepidoptera
- Superfamily: Noctuoidea
- Family: Erebidae
- Subfamily: Arctiinae
- Genus: Afrojavanica
- Species: A. melaena

Binomial name
- Afrojavanica melaena (Hampson, 1901)

Synonyms
- Diacrisia melaena Hampson, 1901; Seydelia melaena; Diacrisia melaena georgina Kalis, 1934

Species of moth

Afrojavanica melaena is a moth in the family Erebidae. It was described by George Hampson in 1901. It is found on Java.
