= Afrojavanica kostlani =

Scientific classification
- Domain: Eukaryota
- Kingdom: Animalia
- Phylum: Arthropoda
- Class: Insecta
- Order: Lepidoptera
- Superfamily: Noctuoidea
- Family: Erebidae
- Subfamily: Arctiinae
- Genus: Afrojavanica
- Species: A. kostlani

Binomial name
- Afrojavanica kostlani (Gaede, 1923)

Synonyms
- Pericallia geometrica kostlani Gaede, 1923; Seydelia kostlani

Species of moth

Afrojavanica kostlani is a moth in the family Erebidae. It was described by Max Gaede in 1923. It is found in Ethiopia and Rwanda.
