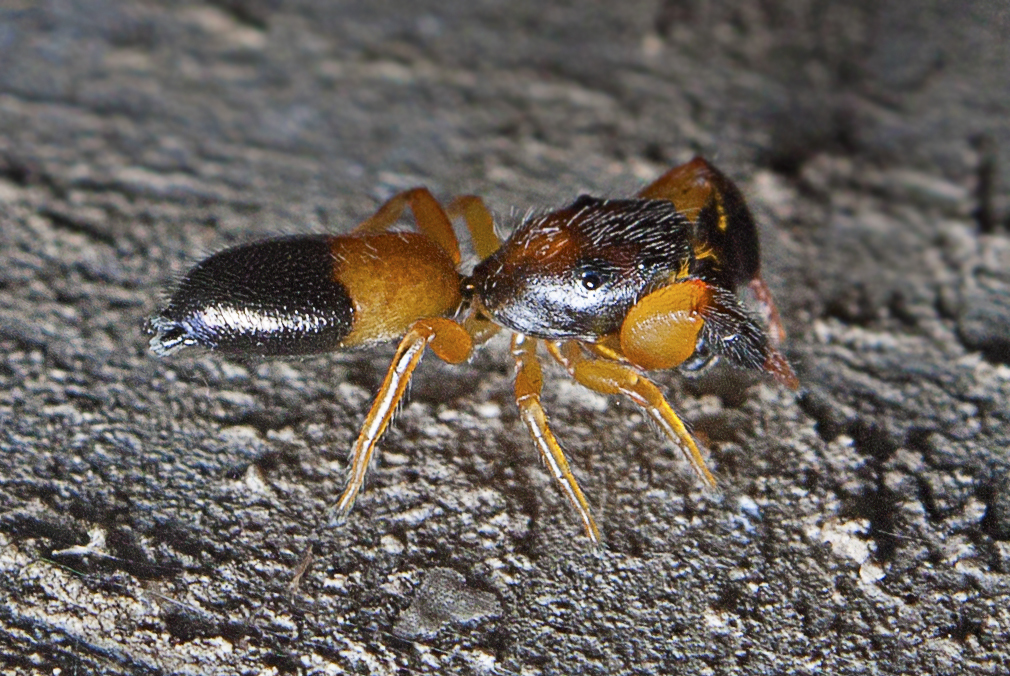

Scientific classification
- Kingdom: Animalia
- Phylum: Arthropoda
- Subphylum: Chelicerata
- Class: Arachnida
- Order: Araneae
- Infraorder: Araneomorphae
- Family: Salticidae
- Genus: Judalana; Rix, 1999
- Species: J. lutea

Binomial name
- Judalana lutea Rix, 1999

= Judalana =

Genus of spiders

Judalana is a genus of jumping spiders. It is an ant mimic found only in Queensland. Its only species is Judalana lutea.
