= Jules Ferdinand Fallou =

French entomologist

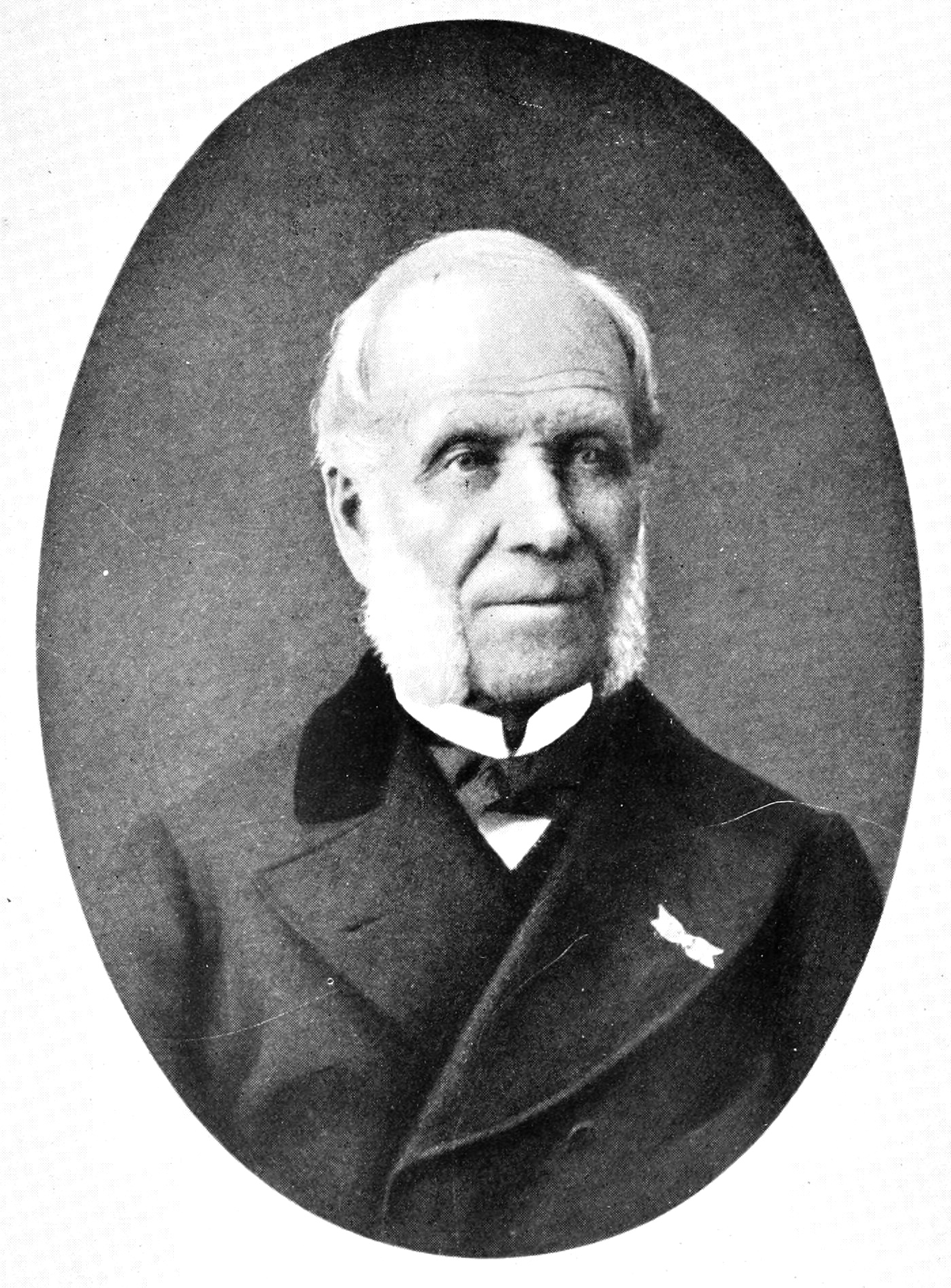
Jules Ferdinand Fallou

Jules Ferdinand Fallou (9 August 1812, in Paris – 19 June 1895, in Paris) was a French entomologist who specialised in Lepidoptera and Coleoptera.

Jules Fallou was a manufacturer of surgical instruments. His collection of European Lepidoptera, mostly from France and Switzerland is held by Muséum national d'histoire naturelle in Paris. He was a Member of the Société entomologique de France.

== Works ==
Descriptive papers in Annales de la Société Entomologique de France.
