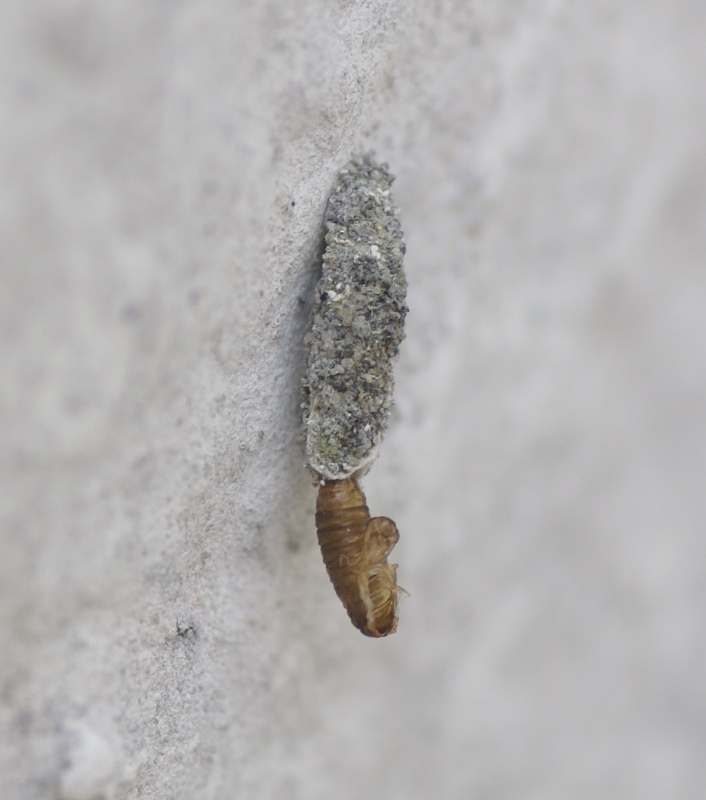
- Dahlica lichenella

Scientific classification
- Kingdom: Animalia
- Phylum: Arthropoda
- Class: Insecta
- Order: Lepidoptera
- Family: Psychidae
- Tribe: Dahlicini
- Genus: Dahlica; Enderlein, 1912

= Dahlica =

Genus of moths

Dahlica is a genus of moths belonging to the family Psychidae.

Species:

- Dahlica triquetrella
- Dahlica lichenella
- Dahlica klimeschi
- Dahlica lazuri
- Dahlica charlottae
- Dahlica fennicella
