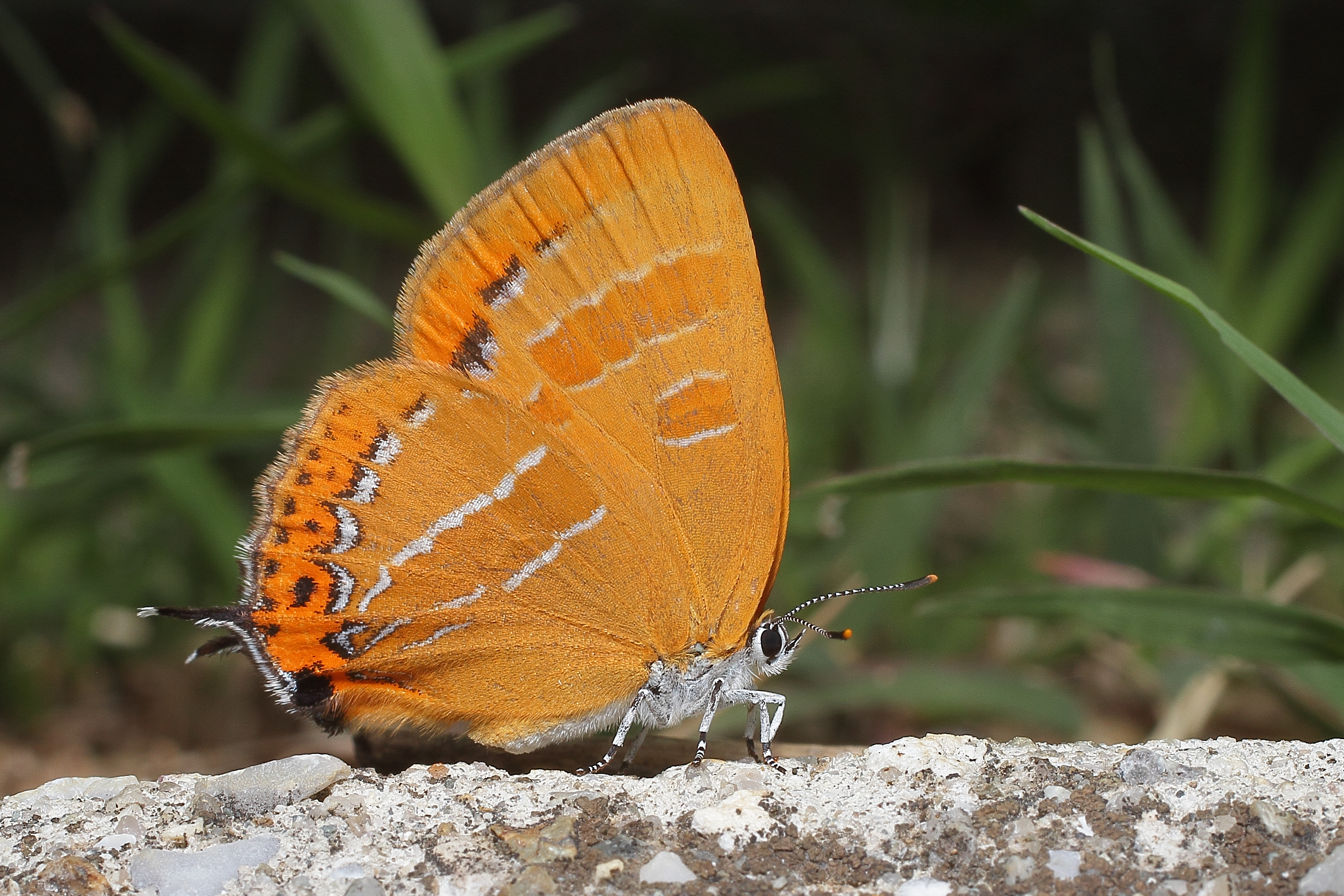

Scientific classification
- Kingdom: Animalia
- Phylum: Arthropoda
- Class: Insecta
- Order: Lepidoptera
- Family: Lycaenidae
- Genus: Japonica
- Species: J. lutea

Binomial name
- Japonica lutea (Hewitson, 1865)

= Japonica lutea =

Species of butterfly

Japonica lutea is a small butterfly found in the East Palearctic that belongs to the lycaenids or blues family.

== Description from Seitz ==
Z. lutea Hew. (74 f). The outer margin of the wings strongly rounded. particularly in the female; hind wing with a long tail. Honey-yellow, the forewing with a broad black distal border. Underside with a white submarginal line, which separates the disc from the orange-red distal margin; on the disc white- edged bands, a short similar hand on the cross-veins of the forewing. In Amurland and Japan. — Larva on Quercus mongolica, very frequently infested with the larvae of Diptera. The butterflies occur in August on wide roads in forests of high trees and also in bush-woods; they are rather plentiful in many places. The Continental specimens do not differ from Japanese ones; the black border of the forewing varies rather strongly in width among the individuals from the same locality.

== Biology ==
The larva on feeds on Quercus mongolica, other Quercus and Cyclobalanopsis glauca.

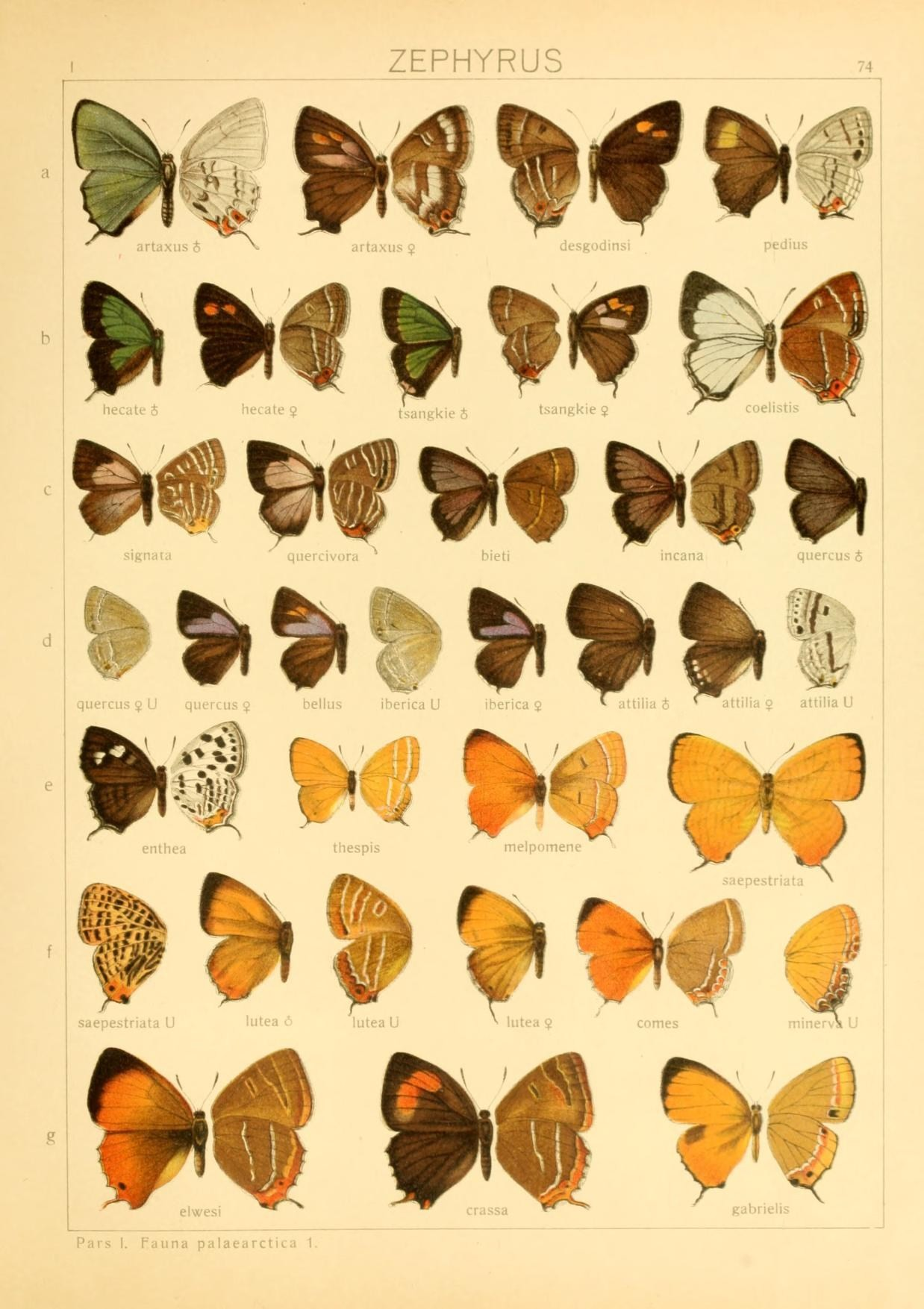
Seitz 74f

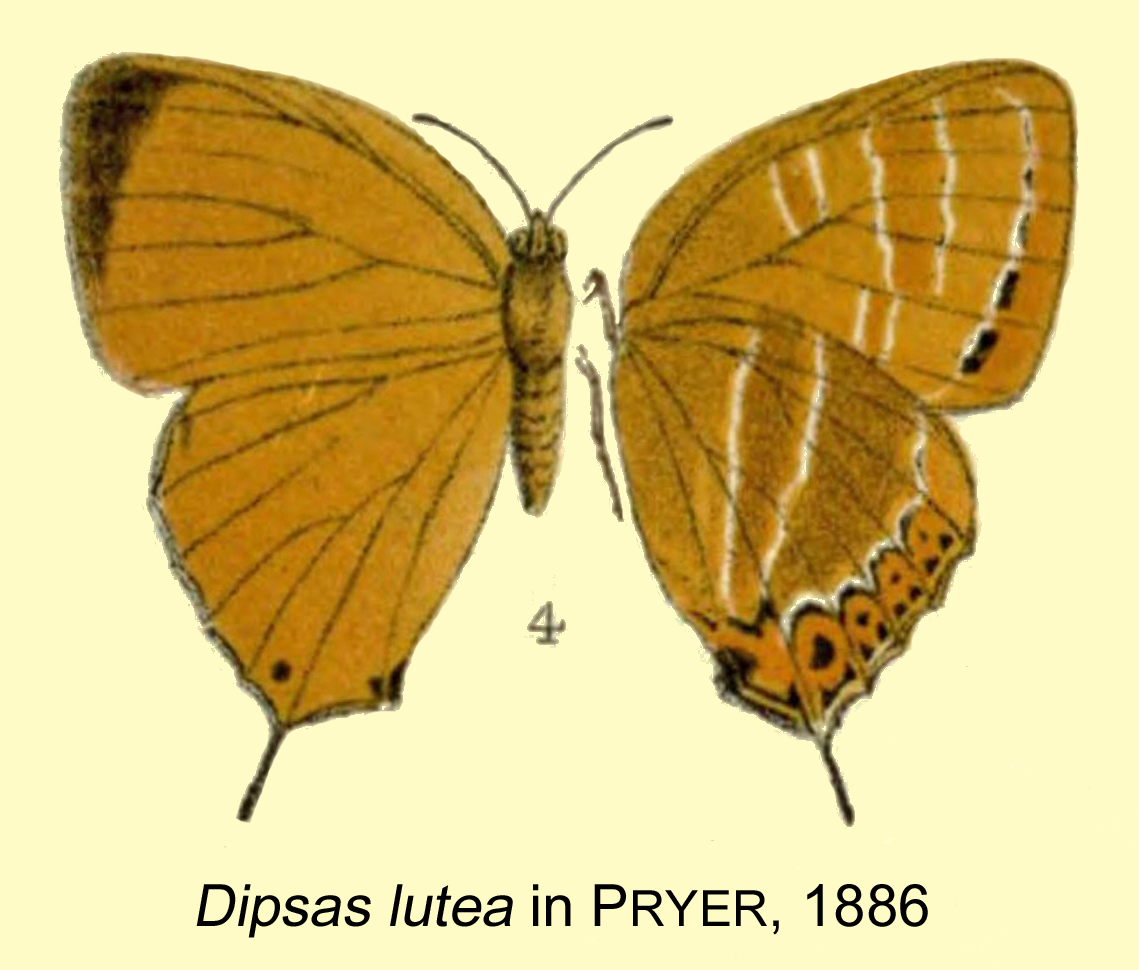
Japonica lutea in Rhopalocera nihonica

== Subspecies ==
- Japonica lutea lutea Japan.
- Japonica lutea adusta (Riley, 1939) Sichuan, East Tibet
- Japonica lutea dubatolovi Fujioka, 1993 Amur Oblast, Ussuri.
- Japonica lutea gansuensis Murayama, 1991
- Japonica lutea patungkoanui Murayama, 1956 Taiwan.
- Japonica lutea tatsienluica (Riley, 1939) Sichuan.

== See also ==
- List of butterflies of Russia
