= Otto Bang-Haas =

German entomologist

Otto Bang-Haas (20 January 1882, Dresden – 30 July 1948, Dresden) was a German entomologist and insect dealer. His collection of microlepidoptera is in the National Museum of Denmark and of Coleoptera in the Natural History Museum of Giacomo Doria, Genoa. He followed his father Andreas Bang-Haas into the business.

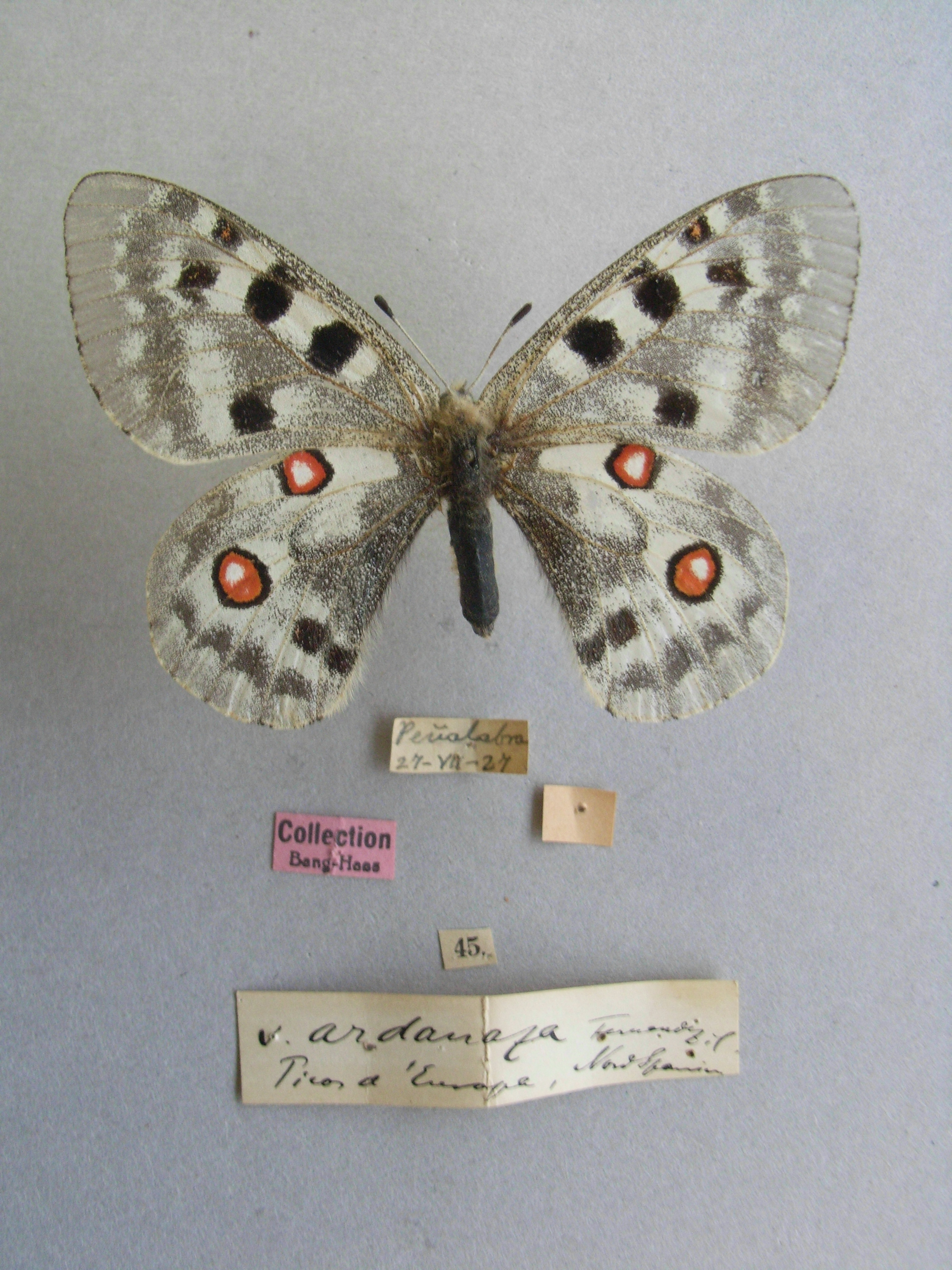
Parnassius apollo specimen purchased from Bang-Hass
