= Vladimir Dubatolov =

Russian entomologist

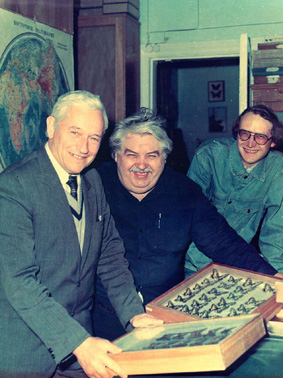
- M. I. Falkovich, Yuri Korshunov, and Dubatolov at the Zoological Museum, Novosibirsk, December 1988
- Born: Vladimir Viktorovich Dubatolov; 2 September 1958 (age 68); Leningrad, USSR
- Citizenship: USSR / Russia
- Known for: Entomologist, wildlife taxonomist

Academic background
- Education: Novosibirsk State University

Vladimir Viktorovich Dubatolov (born 1958) (Russian: Дубатолов, Владимир Викторович) is a Russian entomologist, lepidopterist, Doctor of Biological Sciences, full member of the Russian Entomological Society (since 1979), member of the European Lepidopterological Society (since 1998), curator of the insect collection of the Siberian Zoological Museum, leading researcher at the Institute of Systematics and Ecology of Animals SB RAS (Novosibirsk), leading researcher of the Zapovednoye Priamurye (in Khabarovsk). He has described a number of zoological taxa. The names of these taxa (for attribution) are accompanied by the author abbreviation "Dubatolov".

Dubatolov was born on 2 September 1958 in Leningrad. His father was paleontologist Viktor Nikolaevich Dubatolov (1924-2011) and his mother was Yuliya Afanasyevna Dubatolova (1926-2005), a paleontologist, stratigrapher, and candidate of geological and mineralogical sciences.

In 1980, he graduated from the Faculty of Natural Sciences of Novosibirsk State University. He defended his thesis on the topic "Quantitative analysis of changes in the blade line of ammonoids in the process of evolution."

Since 1980, he has been working in Novosibirsk at the Zoological Museum of the Biological Institute of the Siberian Branch of the USSR Academy of Sciences (now - the Siberian Zoological Museum of the Institute of Animal Systematics and Ecology of the Siberian Branch of the Russian Academy of Sciences).

In 1993, he defended his Ph.D. thesis on the topic: "Diurnal Lepidoptera (Lepidoptera: Hesperioidea, Papilionoidea) of the mountains of Turkmenistan". In 2007 he defended his doctoral dissertation on the topic: "Lepidoptera subfamilies Arctiinae (Lepidoptera, Arctiidae) of the Palaearctic".

He is the curator of the collection of insects of the Siberian Zoological Museum of the Institute of Systematics and Ecology of Animals, Siberian Branch of the Russian Academy of Sciences.

== Scientific interests ==
Research interests include taxonomy and faunistics, faunogenesis and biogeography of the Palaearctic butterflies Arctiinae, Papilionoidea, Russian butterflies from the families Hesperioidea, Geometroidea (without Geometridae), Bombycoidea, Sphingoidea, Noctuoidea; faunistics of Siberian butterflies from the families Tortricidae, Ethmiidae, and some other Microlepidoptera . Since 2003 he has been studying Lepidoptera of the Amur region.

He also works with some other insects: Neuropteroidea, Plecoptera, Vespoidea (Hymenoptera). From the late 1980s to 1991, he collected spiders in Central Asia, which were processed by D.V. Logunov and his colleagues.

== Taxa named after Dubatolov ==
Genus:

- Dubatolovia de Freina, 2010 (Lepidoptera, Erebidae: Arctiinae) - Africa
- Dubatoloviana Bucsek, 2012 (Lepidoptera, Erebidae: Arctiinae) - Southeast Asia
- Dubatolova Kirti, Singh et Joshi, 2014 (Lepidoptera, Erebidae: Arctiinae) - Southeast Asia

Aranea, Salticidae:

- Sitticus (Attulus) dubatolovi Logunov et Rakov, 1998 - Kazakhstan
- Aelurillus dubatolovi Azarkina, 2002 - Turkmenistan

Acarina, Parholaspididae

- Neparholaspis dubatolovi Marchenko, 2016 - Sikhote-Alin

Coleoptera:

- Nebria (Catonebria) sajana dubatolovi Dudko et Shilenkov, 2001 (Carabidae) - Altai
- Cautires dubatolovi Kazantsev, 1995 (Lycidae) - south of the Russian Far East
- Clanoptilus (Hypoptilus) dubatolovi Tshernyshev, 1998 (Malachiidae) - Turkmenistan
- Colotes (Pseudodipnis) dubatolovi Tshernyshev, 2007 (Malachiidae) - Lower Volga region
- Leptapoderus (Pseudoleptapoderus) dubatolovi Legalov, 2003 (Attelabidae) - China
- Donus dubatolovi Leganov, 2011 (Curculionidae) - Kyrgyzstan

Lepidoptera:

- Semagystia dubatolovi Yakovlev, 2007 (Cossidae) - Turkmenistan: Köýtendag Range
- Caloptilia dubatolovi — speckled moth species (Gracillariidae), endemic to the Russian Far East
- Buvatina dubatolovi Lvovsky, 2016 (Oecophoridae) - south of the Russian Far East
- Agonopterix dubatolovi Lvovsky, 1995 (Depressariidae) - Transbaikalia
- Dahlica dubatolovi (Solanikov, 1990) (Psychidae) - Yakutia
- Dichrorampha dubatolovi Syachina, 2008 (Tortricidae) - south of the Russian Far East
- Stenoptilia dubatolovi Ustjuzhanin, 2001 (Pterophoridae) - Turkmenistan: Köýtendag Range
- Agrisius dubatolovi Orhant, 2012 (Erebidae) - Southeast Asia
- Diduga dubatolovi Bayarsaikhan et Bae 2018 (Erebidae: Arctiinae) - Southeast Asia
- Eugoa dubatolovi Volynkin, Bucsek et Černý, 2018 (Erebidae: Arctiinae) - Southeast Asia
- Barsine dubatolovi Volynkin et Černý, 2019 (Erebidae: Arctiinae) - Southeast Asia
- Holoarctia dubatolovi Saldaitis et Ivinskis, 2005 (Erebidae: Arctiinae) - Altai
- Lygephila dubatolovi Fibiger, Kononenko et Nilsson, 2008 (Erebidae) - south of the Russian Far East
- Agrochola (Alpichola) dubatolovi Varga et Ronkay, 1991 (Noctuidae) - Turkmenistan : Kopet Dag range
- Lacanobia dubatolovi Volynkin, 2017 (Noctuidae) - Turkmenistan : Kopet Dag range

Subspecies:

- Euchloe ausonia dubatolovi Korshunov, 1995 (Pieridae) - Altai
- Japonica lutea dubatolovi Fujioka, 1993 (Lycaenidae) - south of the Russian Far East
- Clossiana tritonia dubatolovi Korshunov, 1987 (Nymphalidae) - Khamar-Daban
- Cardepia helix dubatolovi Hacker, 1998 (Noctuidae) - Tajikistan
