= Thomensis =

Thomensis is Latin for "of Thomas" or "of the island of São Tomé". It may refer to several species found on the island and in the surrounding waters:

- Acantuerta thomensis, a moth species found in the island of São Tomé, São Tomé and Príncipe
- Agathodes thomensis, a moth species found in the island of São Tomé, São Tomé and Príncipe
- Andrena thomensis, a mining bee species
- Angraecopsis thomensis, an orchid species
- Asura thomensis, a moth species found in the island of São Tomé, São Tomé and Príncipe
- Bangalaia thomensis, a beetle species found on the island of São Tomé, São Tomé and Príncipe
- Castianeira thomensis, a spider species
- Columba thomensis, São Tomé olive pigeon, a pigeon species found in São Tomé and Príncipe
- Conosia thomensis, a crane fly species found in the island of São Tomé, São Tomé and Príncipe
- Dreptes thomensis, Giant sunbird, a bird species found in the island of São Tomè, São Tomé and Príncipe
- Diaphananthe thomensis, an orchid species found in the island of São Tomé, São Tomé and Príncipe
- Dichromia thomensis, a moth species
- Disparctia thomensis, a moth species found in the island of São Tomé, São Tomé and Príncipe
- Eunidia thomensis, a beetle species found on the island of São Tomé, São Tomé and Príncipe
- Estrilda thomensis, the Cinderella waxbill, a finch species found in southwestern Angola and the extreme northwestern Namibia
- Hipposideros thomensis, the São Tomé leaf-nosed bat, a bat species
- Hyperolius thomensis, Sao Tome giant treefrog, a treefrog species found in the island of São Tomé, São Tomé and Príncipe
- Lygodactylus thomensis, the Annobon dwarf gecko
- Monochamus thomensis, a beetle species found on the island of São Tomé, São Tomé and Príncipe
- Pandanus thomensis, a plant species found on the island of São Tomé, São Tomé and Príncipe
- Pterolophia thomensis, beetle species
- Philothamnus thomensis, a green snake species found in the island of São Tomé, São Tomé and Príncipe
- Pradoxa thomensis, a murex snail species found on the island of São Tomé, São Tomé and Príncipe
- Psychotria thomensis, a flowering plant species
- Rinorea thomensis, a violet plant species found on the island of São Tomé, São Tomé and Príncipe
- Ropica thomensis, a beetle species found on the island of São Tomé, São Tomé and Príncipe
- Schistometopum thomense, a caecilian (cecilian) frog species founded in the island of São Tomé, São Tomé and Príncipe
- Stenandriopsis thomensis, a monotypic thorn species found in the island of São Tomé, São Tomé and Príncipe
- Syrnola thomensis, a pyram snail species found on the island of São Tomé, São Tomé and Príncipe
- Thyrophorella thomensis, a land snail species found in the island of São Tomé, São Tomé and Príncipe
- Zoonavena thomensis, São Tomé spinetail, a swift species found in the islands of São Tomé and nearby Ilhéu de Rolas, São Tomé and Príncipe

It may also refer to a subspecies:

- Corythornus cristatus thomensis, the São Tomé kingfisher
- Tyto alba thomensis, a subspecies of the owl Tyto alba

== Synonyms ==
- Alcedo thomensis, a synonym of Corythornus cristatus thomensis, the São Tomé kingfisher
- Cerura thomensis, a synonym of Afrocerura cameroona, a moth species
- Creatonotos thomensis, a synonym of Disparctia thomensis, a moth species
- Crossandra thomensis, a synonym of Stenandriopsis thomensis, a thorn species
- Dermophis thomensis, a synonym of Schistometopum thomense, a caecilian frog species
- Nectarinia thomensis, a synonym of Dreptes thomensis, the Giant sunbird
- Nephila thomensis, a synonym of Nephila clavipes
- Siphonops thomensis, a synonym of Schistometopum thomense, a caecilian (cecilian) frog species

== See also ==
- Tomensis (disambiguation)
- Thomae (disambiguation)
- Santomensis (disambiguation)
