= Tomensis =

Tomensis is Latin for "of Thomas" or "of the island of São Tomé". It may refer to several species:

- Barleeia tomensis, a species of barley snail
- Chaerephon tomensis, the São Tomé free-tailed bat
- Lellingeria tomensis, a fern species
- Mycetophila tomensis, a fungus gnat species
- Pseudoclanis tomensis, a species of hawkmoths found on the island of São Tomé, São Tomé and Príncipe
- Pterostichus tomensis, a ground beetle species
- Trentepohlia tomensis, a crane fly species

It also may refer to a subspecies:

- Rousettus aegyptiacus tomensis, a subspecies of the Egyptian fruit bat

== See also ==
- Thomensis (disambiguation)
- Thomae (disambiguation)
- Santomensis/Saotomensis (disambiguation)
