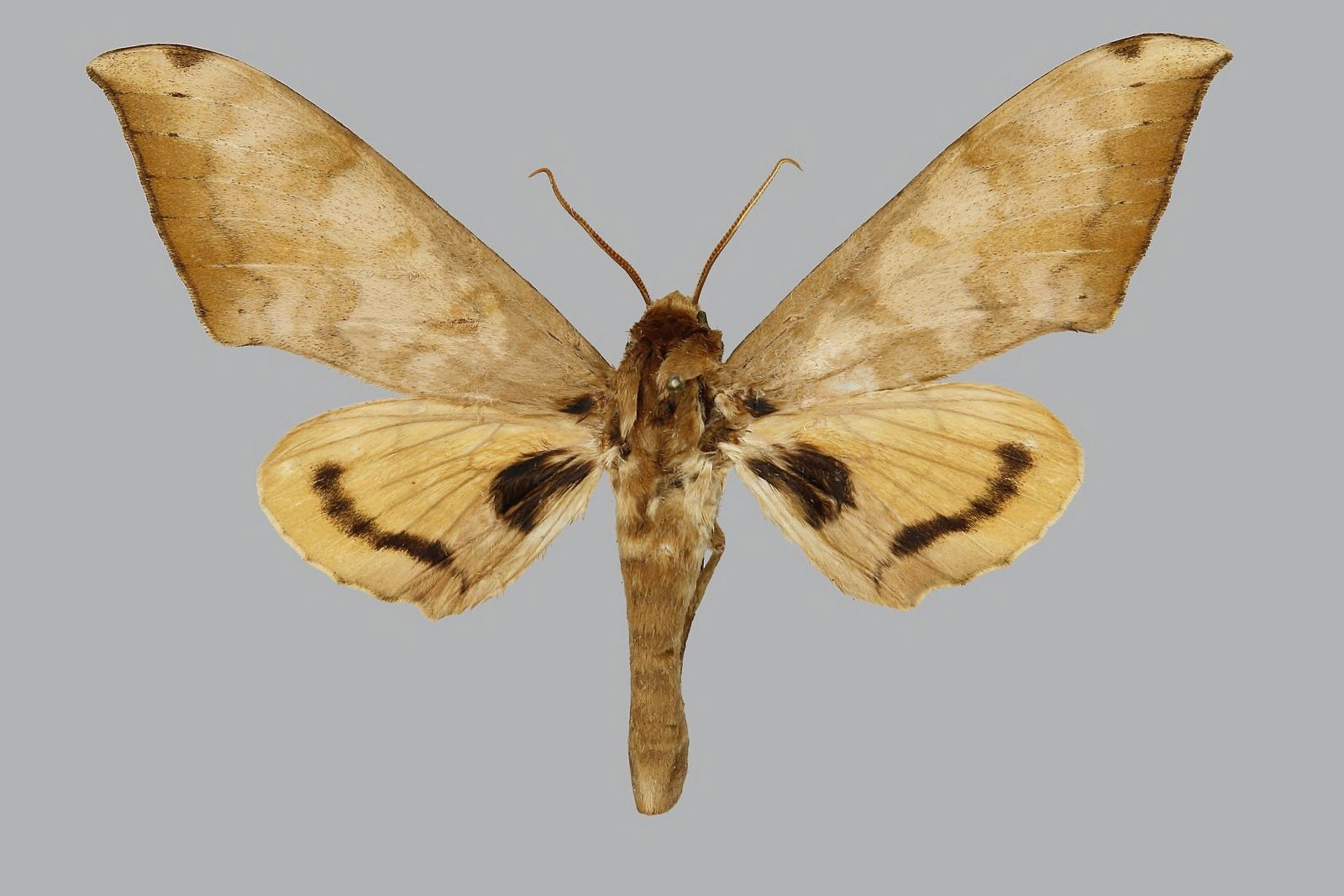

Scientific classification
- Domain: Eukaryota
- Kingdom: Animalia
- Phylum: Arthropoda
- Class: Insecta
- Order: Lepidoptera
- Family: Sphingidae
- Genus: Pseudoclanis
- Species: P. canui

Binomial name
- Pseudoclanis canui Darge, 1991

= Pseudoclanis canui =

Species of moth

Pseudoclanis canui is a moth of the family Sphingidae. It occurs on the island of Príncipe, in the Gulf of Guinea. The species was first described by Philippe Darge in 1991.

== See also ==
- Pseudoclanis tomensis - a species of the same genus found on the island of São Tomé
