= Stenandriopsis =

Scientific classification
- Kingdom: Plantae
- Clade: Tracheophytes
- Clade: Angiosperms
- Clade: Eudicots
- Clade: Asterids
- Order: Lamiales
- Family: Acanthaceae
- Subfamily: Acanthoideae
- Tribe: Acantheae
- Genus: Stenandriopsis; S.Moore (1906)

Species
- See text.

Synonyms
- Achyrocalyx Benoist (1929 publ. 1930)

Genus of plants

Stenandriopsis is a genus of flowering plants belonging to the family Acanthaceae. It includes 20 species native to tropical Africa and Madagascar. Molecular phylogenies have placed the Old World Stenandriopsis apart from New World Stenandrium, and the genus is accepted in a classification of the family Acanthaceae published in 2022.

== Species ==
22 species are accepted.

- Stenandriopsis afromontana (Mildbr.) Benoist
- Stenandriopsis amoena Benoist
- Stenandriopsis boivinii (Baill. ex Lindau) Benoist
- Stenandriopsis buntingii (S.Moore) Heine
- Stenandriopsis carduacea Benoist
- Stenandriopsis darainensis I.Darbysh. & Callm.
- Stenandriopsis decaryi (Benoist) T.F.Daniel, McDade & Kiel
- Stenandriopsis gabonica (Benoist) Heine
- Stenandriopsis gossypina (Benoist) T.F.Daniel, McDade & Kiel
- Stenandriopsis grandiflora (Vollesen) T.F.Daniel, McDade & Kiel
- Stenandriopsis guineensis (Nees) Benoist
- Stenandriopsis humilis Benoist
- Stenandriopsis leptostachys Benoist
- Stenandriopsis longifolia (Benoist) I.Darbysh. & Callm.
- Stenandriopsis pauciflora (Vollesen) T.F.Daniel, McDade & Kiel
- Stenandriopsis perrieri Benoist
- Stenandriopsis pungens (Benoist) T.F.Daniel, McDade & Kiel
- Stenandriopsis subdentata Benoist
- Stenandriopsis talbotii (S.Moore) Heine
- Stenandriopsis thomensis (Milne-Redh.) Heine
- Stenandriopsis thompsonii S.Moore
- Stenandriopsis warneckei (S.Moore) Hopper
