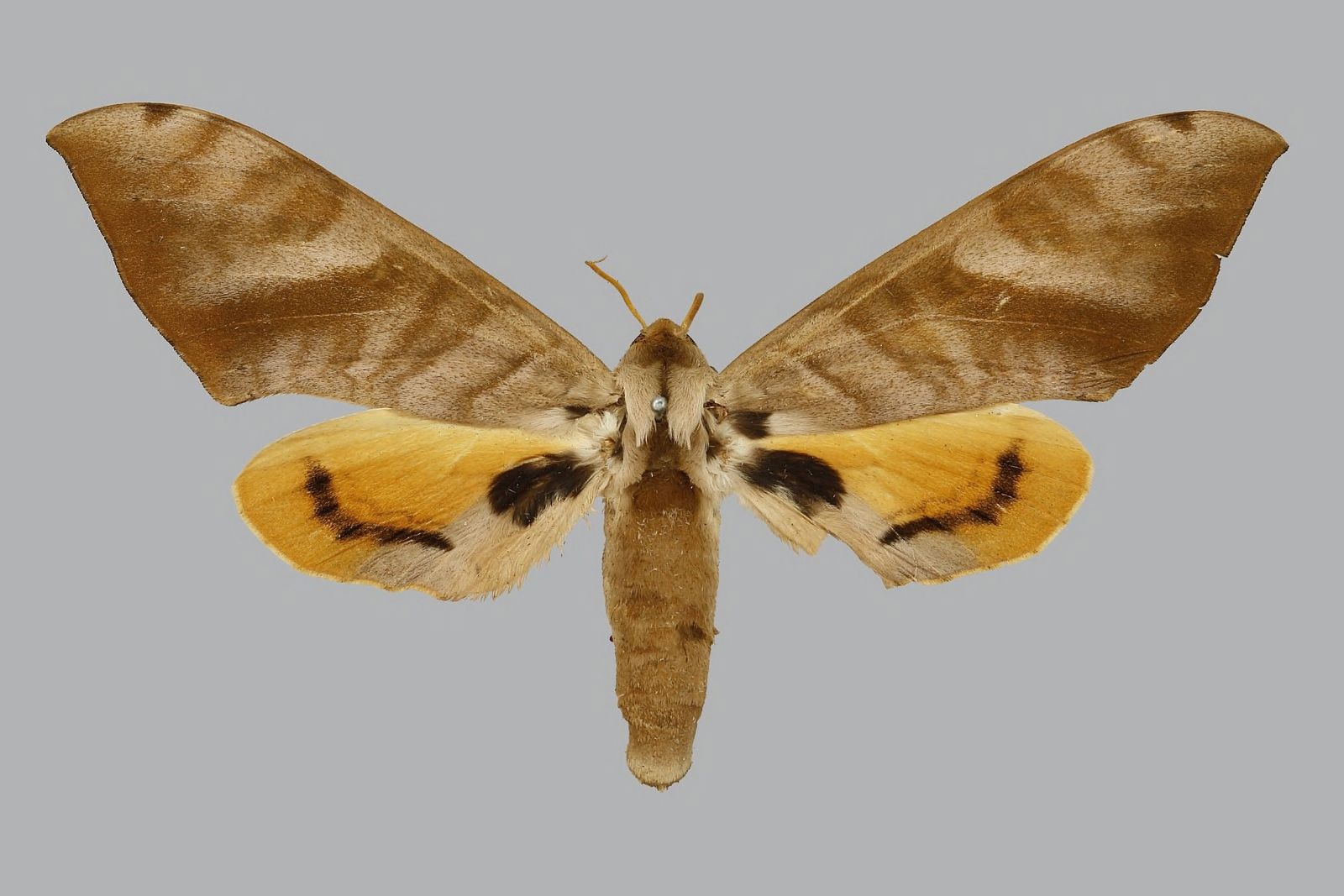

Scientific classification
- Kingdom: Animalia
- Phylum: Arthropoda
- Class: Insecta
- Order: Lepidoptera
- Family: Sphingidae
- Genus: Pseudoclanis
- Species: P. evestigata

Binomial name
- Pseudoclanis evestigata Kernbach, 1955

= Pseudoclanis evestigata =

Species of moth

Pseudoclanis evestigata is a moth of the family Sphingidae. It is known from Zambia.
