= Stenandrium hirsutum =

Scientific classification
- Kingdom: Plantae
- Clade: Embryophytes
- Clade: Tracheophytes
- Clade: Spermatophytes
- Clade: Angiosperms
- Clade: Eudicots
- Clade: Asterids
- Order: Lamiales
- Family: Acanthaceae
- Genus: Stenandrium
- Species: S. hirsutum

Binomial name
- Stenandrium hirsutum Nees

Species of flowering plant

Stenandrium hirsutum is a plant native to the Cerrado vegetation of Brazil. The description of the plant was published in Flora Brasiliensis in 1847.
