= Disparctia varicolor =

Scientific classification
- Kingdom: Animalia
- Phylum: Arthropoda
- Class: Insecta
- Order: Lepidoptera
- Superfamily: Noctuoidea
- Family: Erebidae
- Subfamily: Arctiinae
- Genus: Disparctia
- Species: D. varicolor

Binomial name
- Disparctia varicolor Toulgoët, 1978

Species of moth

Disparctia varicolor is a moth of the family Erebidae. It was described by Hervé de Toulgoët in 1978. It is found in Rwanda and Uganda.
