= Disparctia =

Scientific classification
- Kingdom: Animalia
- Phylum: Arthropoda
- Class: Insecta
- Order: Lepidoptera
- Superfamily: Noctuoidea
- Family: Erebidae
- Subfamily: Arctiinae
- Subtribe: Spilosomina
- Genus: Disparctia; Toulgoët, 1978

Type species
- Spilarctia vittata Druce, 1898

Genus of moths

Disparctia is a genus of tiger moths in the family Erebidae. The genus was erected by Hervé de Toulgoët in 1978. The moths in the genus are found in the Afrotropics.

== Species ==
- Disparctia thomensis (Joicey & Talbot, 1926)
- Disparctia varicolor Toulgoët, 1978
- Disparctia vittata (Druce, 1898)
