= Acantuerta ladina =

Scientific classification
- Domain: Eukaryota
- Kingdom: Animalia
- Phylum: Arthropoda
- Class: Insecta
- Order: Lepidoptera
- Superfamily: Noctuoidea
- Family: Noctuidae
- Genus: Acantuerta
- Species: A. ladina

Binomial name
- Acantuerta ladina Jordan, 1926

Species of moth

Acantuerta ladina is a species of moth in the genus Acantuerta of the family Noctuidae. It is found in the Lado Enclave.
