= Pseudoclanis kakamegae =

Scientific classification
- Kingdom: Animalia
- Phylum: Arthropoda
- Class: Insecta
- Order: Lepidoptera
- Family: Sphingidae
- Genus: Pseudoclanis
- Species: P. kakamegae

Binomial name
- Pseudoclanis kakamegae Eitschberger, 2007

Species of moth

Pseudoclanis kakamegae is a moth of the family Sphingidae. It is known from the Kakamega rainforest in Kenya.
