= Stenandrium pohlii =

Scientific classification
- Kingdom: Plantae
- Clade: Tracheophytes
- Clade: Angiosperms
- Clade: Eudicots
- Clade: Asterids
- Order: Lamiales
- Family: Acanthaceae
- Genus: Stenandrium
- Species: S. pohlii

Binomial name
- Stenandrium pohlii Nees (1847)

Synonyms
- Caldenbachia elegans Pohl ex Nees (1847); Stenandrium pohlii var. breviscapum Nees (1847); Stenandrium pohlii var. pusillum Nees (1847)

Species of flowering plant

Stenandrium pohlii, with Portuguese common names caiapiá or carapiá, is a species of flowering plant in the family Acanthaceae. It is a perennial native to Bolivia, Paraguay, and western, southeastern, and southern Brazil. It is native to Cerrado and Pantanal ecoregions of Brazil. The description of the plant was published in Flora Brasiliensis in 1847.
