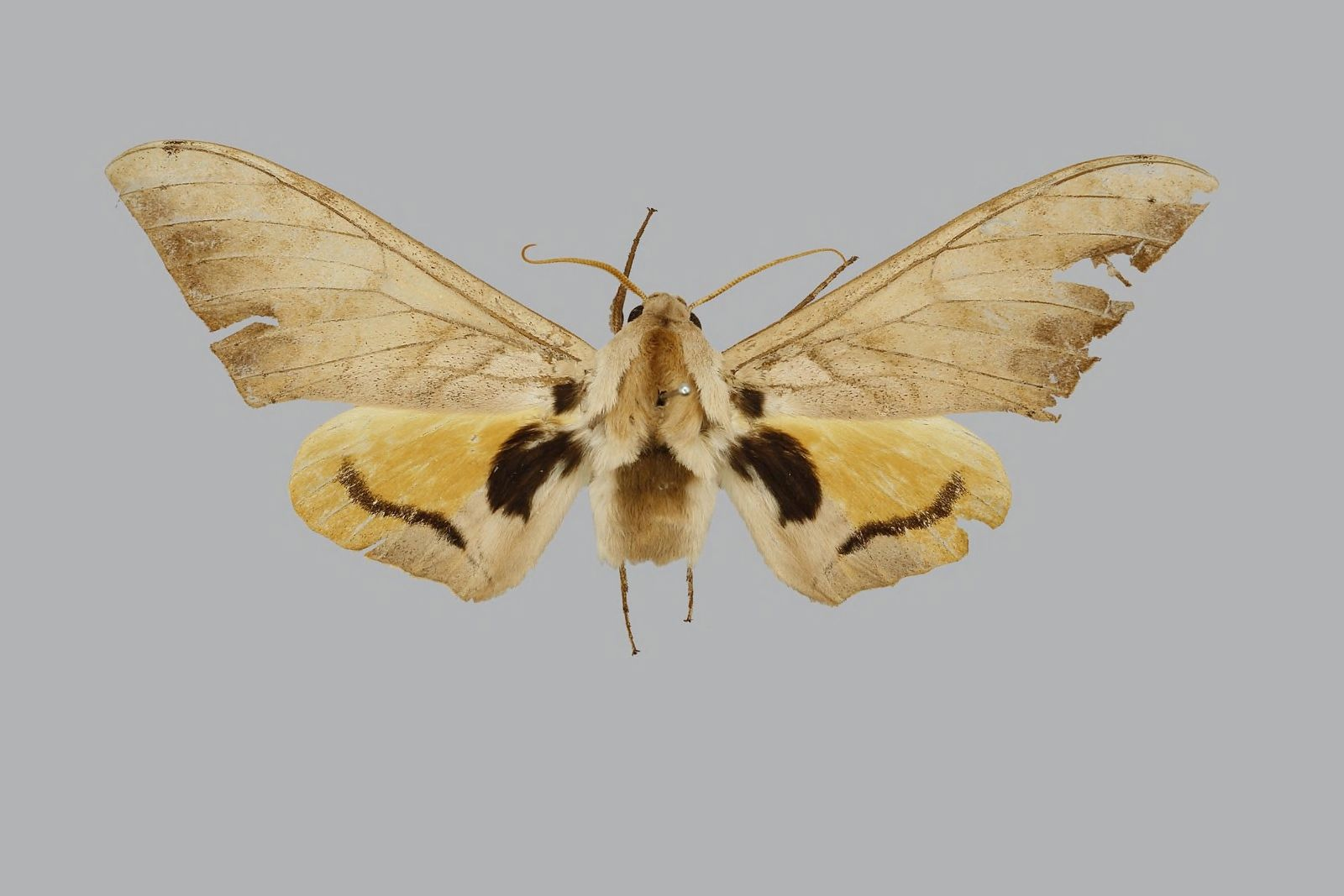

Scientific classification
- Domain: Eukaryota
- Kingdom: Animalia
- Phylum: Arthropoda
- Class: Insecta
- Order: Lepidoptera
- Family: Sphingidae
- Genus: Pseudoclanis
- Species: P. biokoensis

Binomial name
- Pseudoclanis biokoensis Darge, 1991

= Pseudoclanis biokoensis =

Species of moth

Pseudoclanis biokoensis is a moth of the family Sphingidae. It is known from São Tomé and Príncipe.
