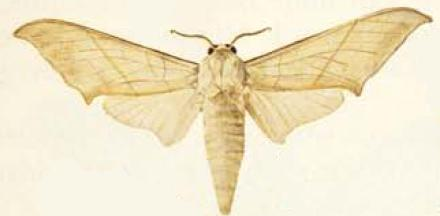

Scientific classification
- Domain: Eukaryota
- Kingdom: Animalia
- Phylum: Arthropoda
- Class: Insecta
- Order: Lepidoptera
- Family: Sphingidae
- Tribe: Smerinthini
- Genus: Pseudoclanis
- Species: P. molitor

Binomial name
- Pseudoclanis molitor (Rothschild & Jordan, 1912)

Synonyms
- Polyptychus molitor Rothschild & Jordan, 1912; Polyptychus molitor lautus Jordan, 1920; Pseudoclanis subviridis (Talbot, 1932); Larunda sororia Kernbach, 1954

= Pseudoclanis molitor =

Genus of moths

Pseudoclanis molitor is a moth from the family Sphingidae, which is known from open savanna and arid areas throughout tropical Africa.

The wingspan is 80–93 mm.
