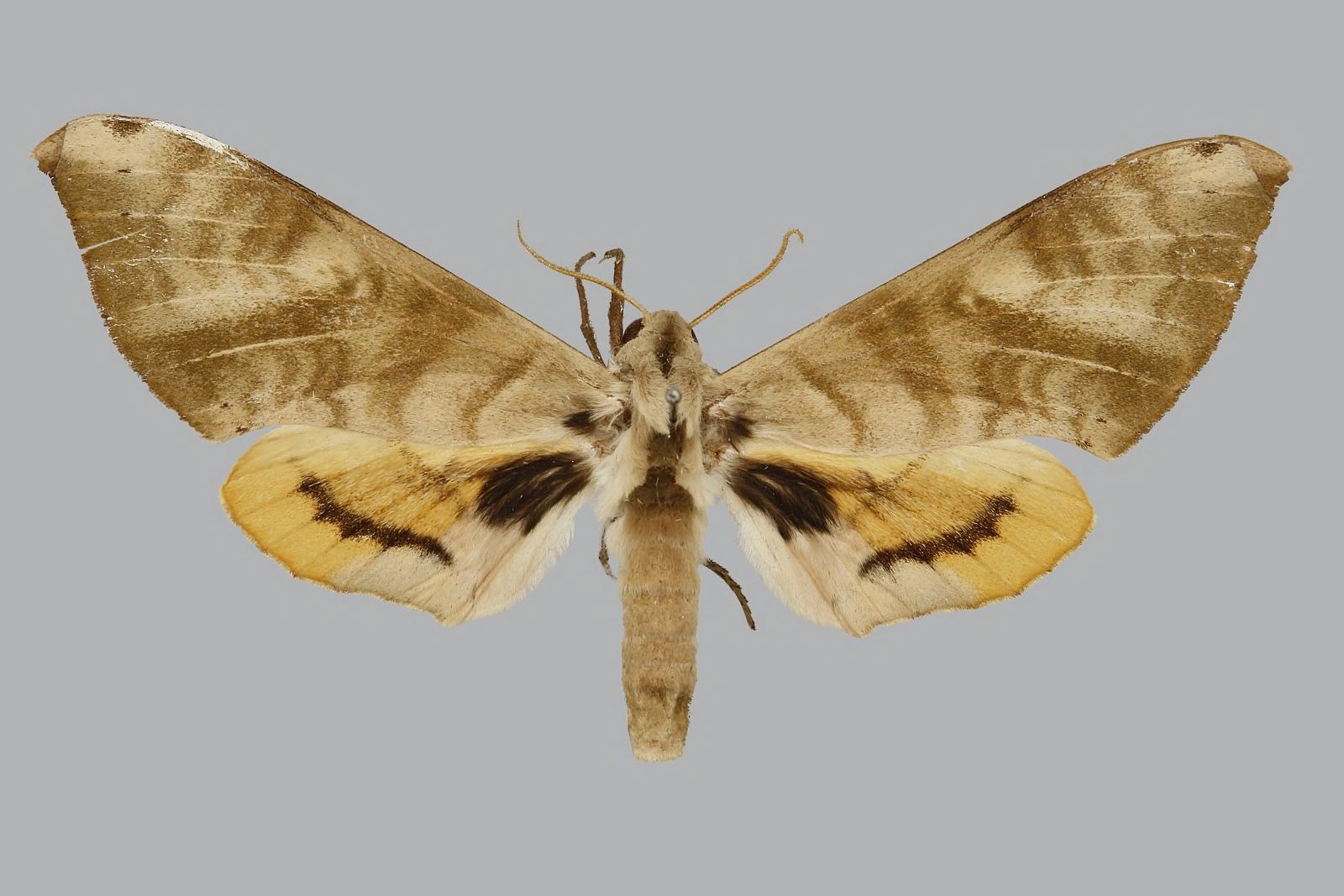

Scientific classification
- Kingdom: Animalia
- Phylum: Arthropoda
- Class: Insecta
- Order: Lepidoptera
- Family: Sphingidae
- Genus: Pseudoclanis
- Species: P. diana

Binomial name
- Pseudoclanis diana Gehlen, 1922

= Pseudoclanis diana =

Species of moth

Pseudoclanis diana is a moth of the family Sphingidae. It is known from Angola and Namibia.
