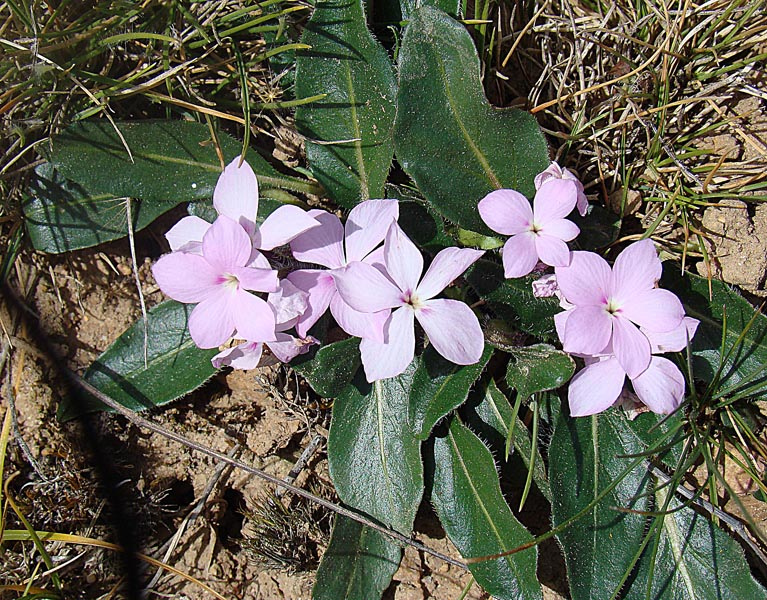

Conservation status
- Apparently Secure (NatureServe)

Scientific classification
- Kingdom: Plantae
- Clade: Tracheophytes
- Clade: Angiosperms
- Clade: Eudicots
- Clade: Asterids
- Order: Lamiales
- Family: Acanthaceae
- Genus: Stenandrium
- Species: S. dulce

Binomial name
- Stenandrium dulce (Cav.) Nees

Synonyms
- Ruellia dulcis Cav.; Gerardia dulcis (Cav.) S.F.Blake

= Stenandrium dulce =

Species of plant

Stenandrium dulce, commonly known as sweet shaggytuft, is a perennial plant in the family Acanthaceae. It is native to both North and South America; found as far north as Texas, Florida, and Georgia in the United States, and as far south as central Chile.
