= Pseudoclanis zairensis =

Scientific classification
- Kingdom: Animalia
- Phylum: Arthropoda
- Class: Insecta
- Order: Lepidoptera
- Family: Sphingidae
- Genus: Pseudoclanis
- Species: P. zairensis

Binomial name
- Pseudoclanis zairensis Eitschberger, 2007

Species of moth

Pseudoclanis zairensis is a moth of the family Sphingidae. It is known from the Democratic Republic of Congo.
