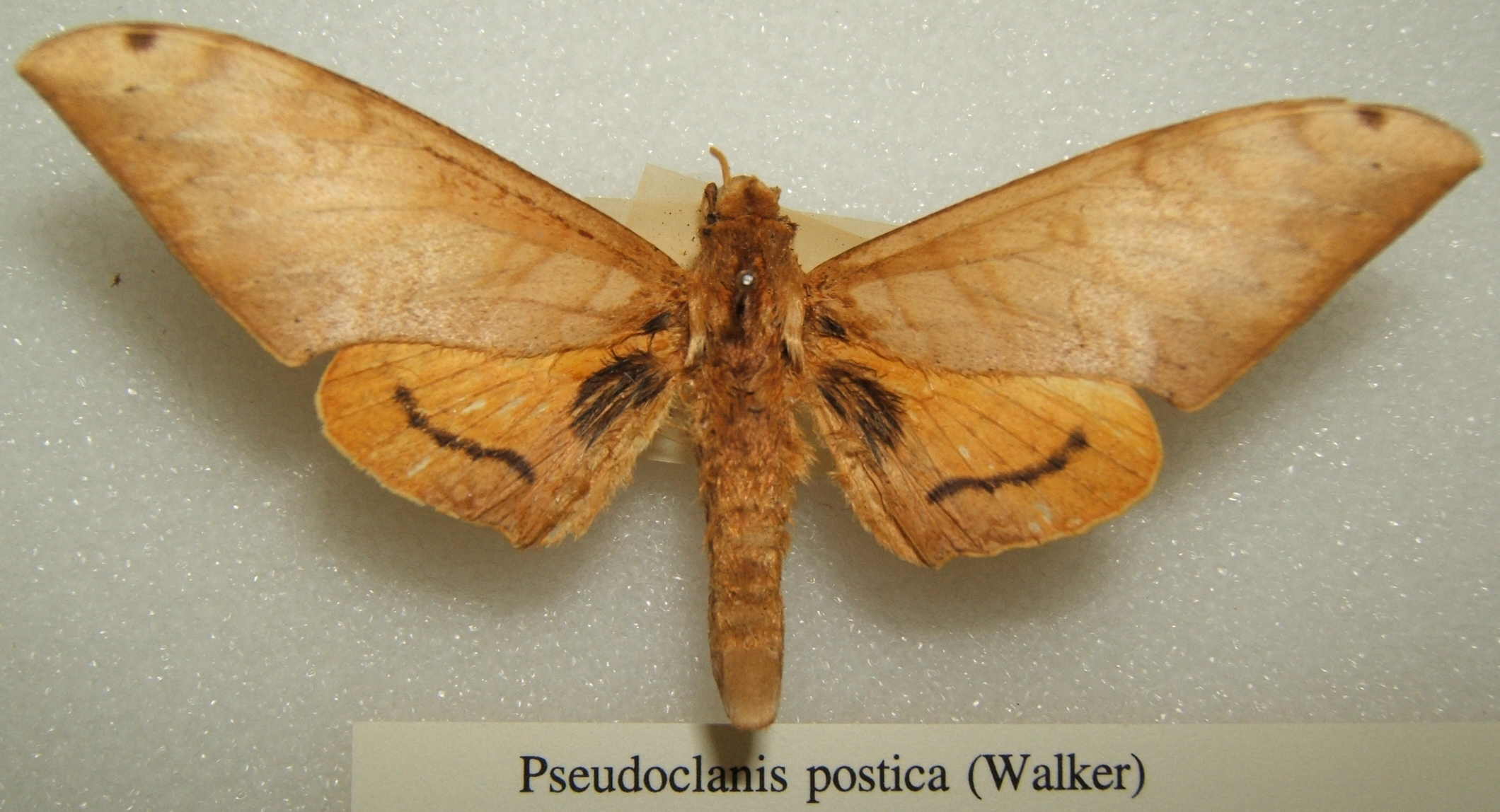
- Pseudoclanis postica

Scientific classification
- Domain: Eukaryota
- Kingdom: Animalia
- Phylum: Arthropoda
- Class: Insecta
- Order: Lepidoptera
- Family: Sphingidae
- Subfamily: Smerinthinae
- Tribe: Smerinthini
- Genus: Pseudoclanis; Rothschild, 1894

Species
- See text

Synonyms
- Larunda Kernbach, 1894

= Pseudoclanis =

Genus of moths

Pseudoclanis is a genus of moths in the family Sphingidae erected by Walter Rothschild in 1894. They are found in sub-Saharan Africa and the southern part of the Arabian Peninsula.

== Species ==
- Pseudoclanis abyssinicus (Lucas 1857)
- Pseudoclanis aequabilis Darge, 2005
- Pseudoclanis axis Darge 1993
- Pseudoclanis biokoensis Darge 1991
- Pseudoclanis canui Darge 1991
- Pseudoclanis diana Gehlen 1922
- Pseudoclanis evestigata Kernbach 1955
- Pseudoclanis kakamegae Eitschberger, 2007
- Pseudoclanis kenyae Clark 1928
- Pseudoclanis molitor (Rothschild & Jordan, 1912)
- Pseudoclanis occidentalis Rothschild & Jordan 1903
- Pseudoclanis postica (Walker 1956)
- Pseudoclanis somaliae Eitschberger, 2007
- Pseudoclanis tomensis Pierre 1992
- Pseudoclanis zairensis Eitschberger, 2007
