= Disparctia vittata =

Scientific classification
- Domain: Eukaryota
- Kingdom: Animalia
- Phylum: Arthropoda
- Class: Insecta
- Order: Lepidoptera
- Superfamily: Noctuoidea
- Family: Erebidae
- Subfamily: Arctiinae
- Genus: Disparctia
- Species: D. vittata

Binomial name
- Disparctia vittata (H. Druce, 1898)

Synonyms
- Spilarctia vittata H. Druce, 1898; Creatonotos vittata var. buea Strand, 1913

Species of moth

Disparctia vittata is a moth of the family Erebidae. It was described by Herbert Druce in 1898. It is found in Cameroon, the Democratic Republic of the Congo, Ghana, Kenya, Nigeria, Sierra Leone and Uganda.

The larvae feed on Veronia amygdalina, Cordia abyssinica, Manihot esculentus and Phytolacca dodecandra.
