= Stenandrium acuminatum =

Scientific classification
- Kingdom: Plantae
- Clade: Embryophytes
- Clade: Tracheophytes
- Clade: Angiosperms
- Clade: Eudicots
- Clade: Asterids
- Order: Lamiales
- Family: Acanthaceae
- Genus: Stenandrium
- Species: S. acuminatum

Binomial name
- Stenandrium acuminatum Urb.

Species of flowering plant

Stenandrium acuminatum is a plant in the Acanthaceae family native to Haiti.
