= Pseudoclanis somaliae =

Scientific classification
- Kingdom: Animalia
- Phylum: Arthropoda
- Class: Insecta
- Order: Lepidoptera
- Family: Sphingidae
- Genus: Pseudoclanis
- Species: P. somaliae

Binomial name
- Pseudoclanis somaliae Eitschberger, 2007

Species of moth

Pseudoclanis somaliae is a moth of the family Sphingidae. It is known from Somalia.
