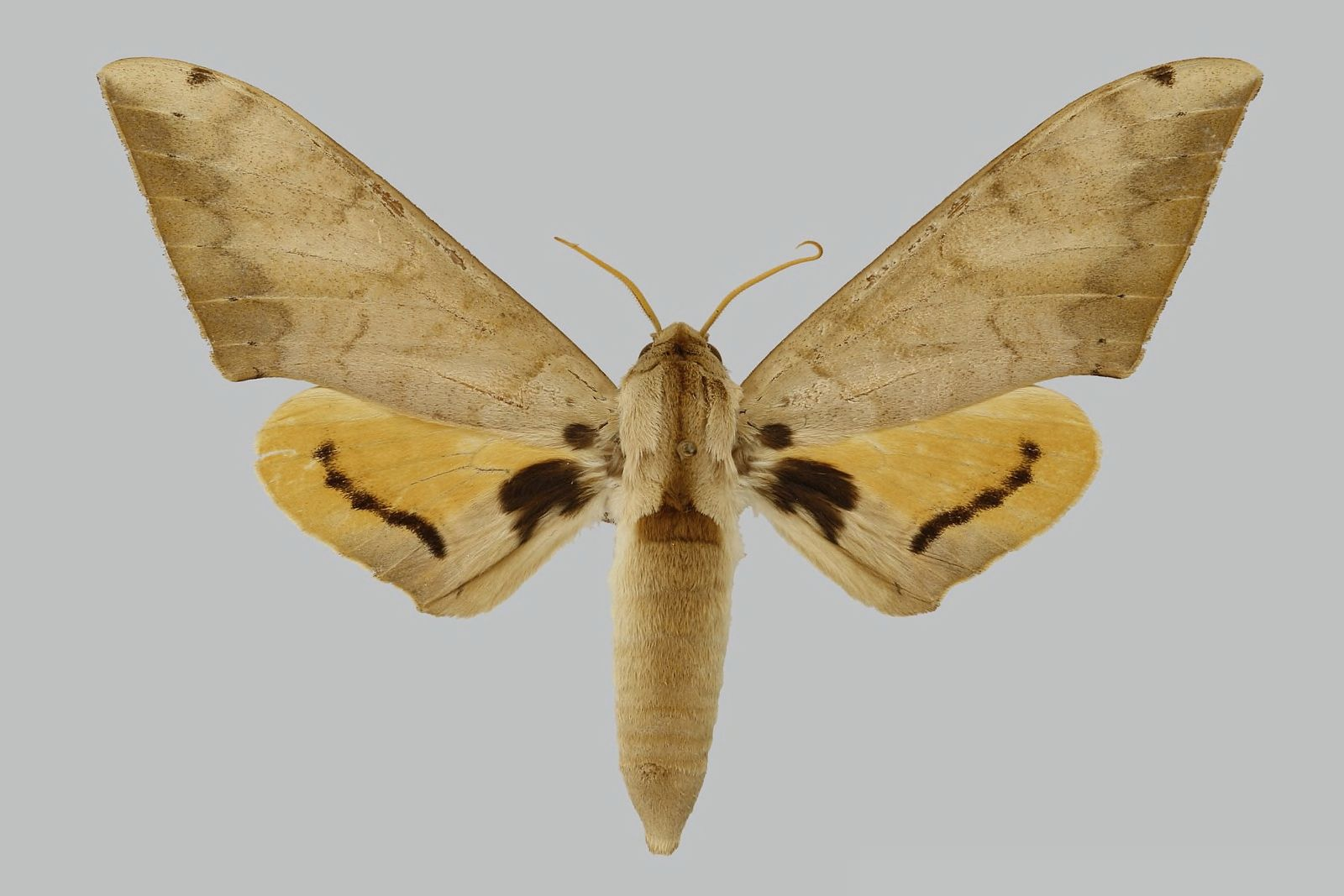

Scientific classification
- Kingdom: Animalia
- Phylum: Arthropoda
- Class: Insecta
- Order: Lepidoptera
- Family: Sphingidae
- Genus: Pseudoclanis
- Species: P. occidentalis

Binomial name
- Pseudoclanis occidentalis Rothschild & Jordan, 1903

= Pseudoclanis occidentalis =

Species of moth

Pseudoclanis occidentalis is a moth of the family Sphingidae. It is known from Sierra Leone, Ivory Coast, Ghana, Cameroon, Gabon, the Central African Republic and Kenya.

The larvae feed on Ficus natalensis, Ficus asperifolia, Ficus leprieurii, Ficus platyphylla, Ficus macrosperma, Ficus mucoso, Ficus umbellata, Urera camerunensis, Sterculia tragacantha, Loranthus and Celtis species.
