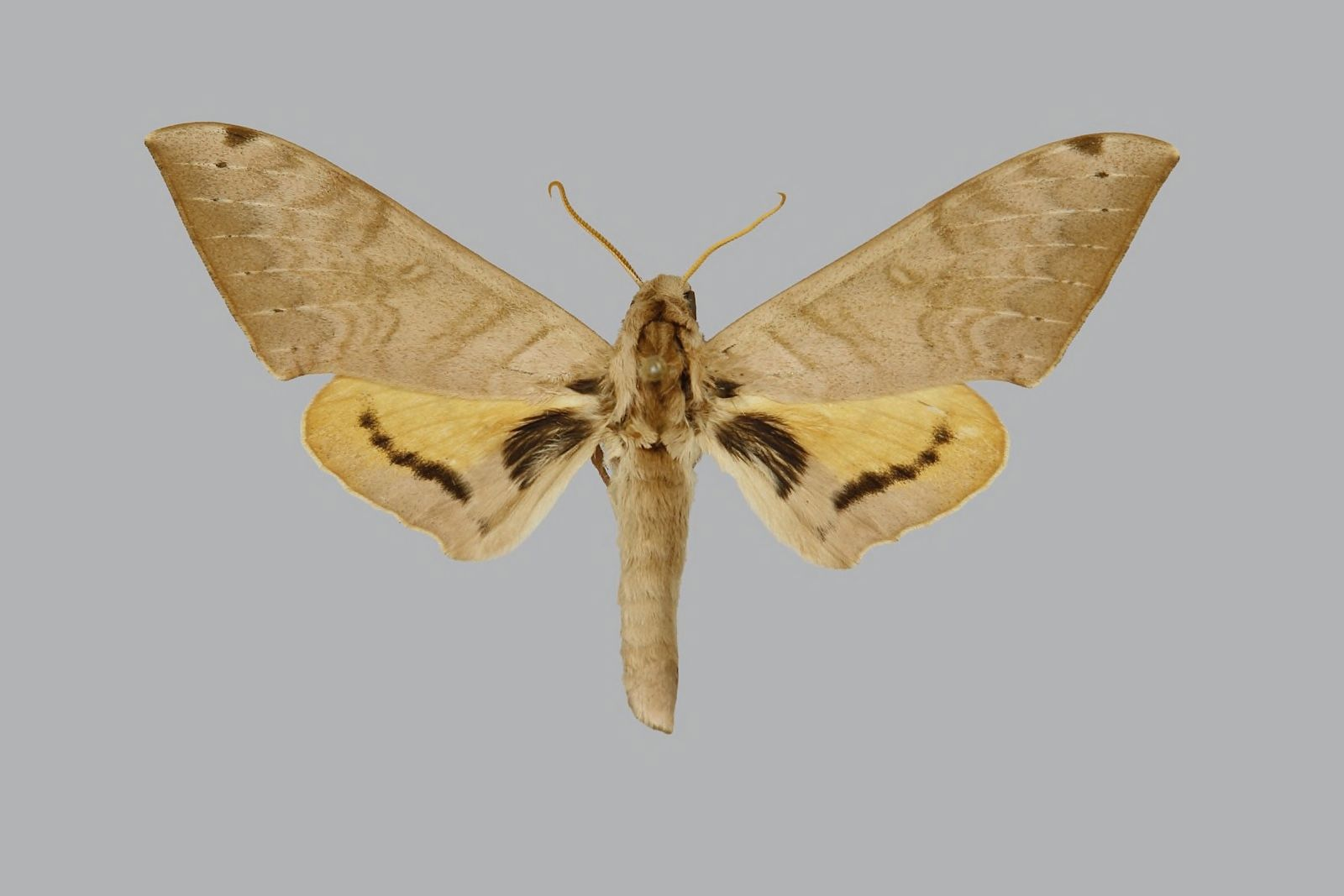

Scientific classification
- Domain: Eukaryota
- Kingdom: Animalia
- Phylum: Arthropoda
- Class: Insecta
- Order: Lepidoptera
- Family: Sphingidae
- Genus: Pseudoclanis
- Species: P. axis

Binomial name
- Pseudoclanis axis Darge 1993

= Pseudoclanis axis =

Species of moth

Pseudoclanis axis is a moth of the family Sphingidae. It is known from Cameroon.
