= Pseudoclanis aequabilis =

Scientific classification
- Domain: Eukaryota
- Kingdom: Animalia
- Phylum: Arthropoda
- Class: Insecta
- Order: Lepidoptera
- Family: Sphingidae
- Genus: Pseudoclanis
- Species: P. aequabilis

Binomial name
- Pseudoclanis aequabilis Darge, 2005

Species of insect

Pseudoclanis aequabilis is a moth of the family Sphingidae. It is known from Tanzania.

The length of the forewings is 56–73 mm (dry season form) and 73–80 mm (wet season form) for males and 76 mm (dry season form) and 96 mm (wet season form) for females.
