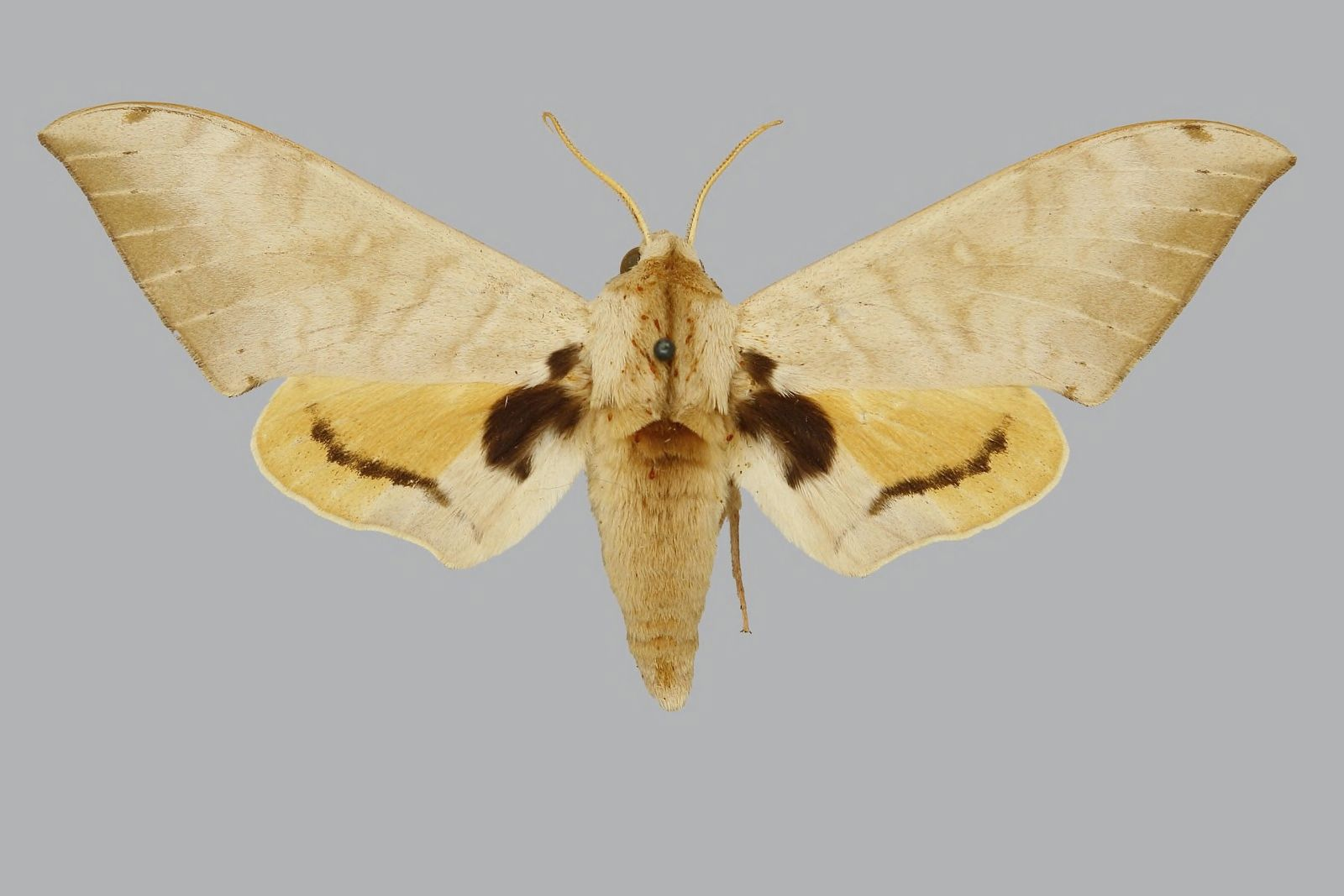

Scientific classification
- Kingdom: Animalia
- Phylum: Arthropoda
- Class: Insecta
- Order: Lepidoptera
- Family: Sphingidae
- Genus: Pseudoclanis
- Species: P. abyssinicus

Binomial name
- Pseudoclanis abyssinicus H. Lucas, 1857

= Pseudoclanis abyssinicus =

Species of moth

Pseudoclanis abyssinicus is a moth of the family Sphingidae first described by Hippolyte Lucas in 1857. It is known from Sudan and Ethiopia.
