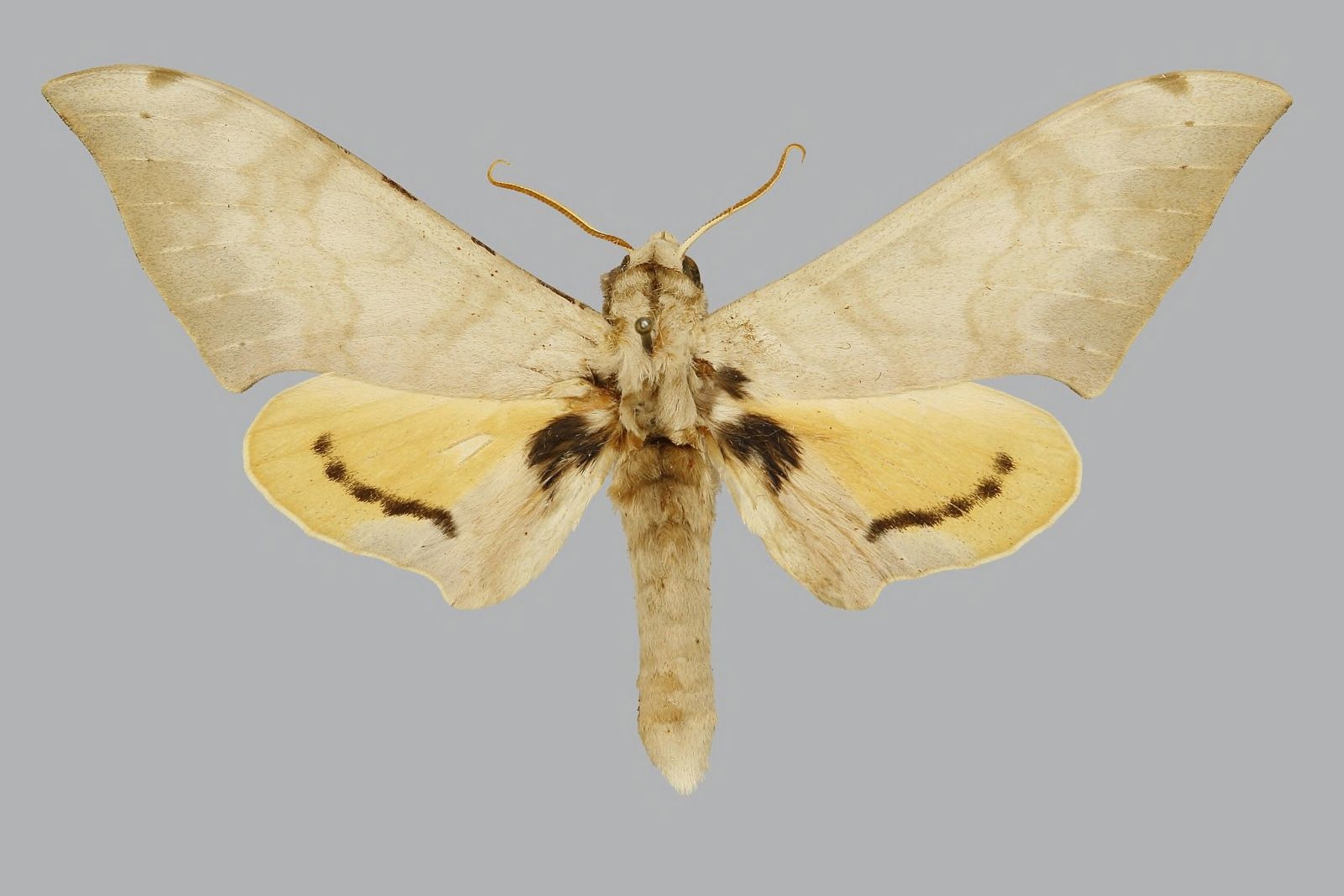

Scientific classification
- Domain: Eukaryota
- Kingdom: Animalia
- Phylum: Arthropoda
- Class: Insecta
- Order: Lepidoptera
- Family: Sphingidae
- Genus: Pseudoclanis
- Species: P. kenyae

Binomial name
- Pseudoclanis kenyae Clark, 1928

Synonyms
- Pseudoclanis postica pallida Closs, 1918

= Pseudoclanis kenyae =

Species of moth

Pseudoclanis kenyae is a moth of the family Sphingidae. It is known from Sudan, Ethiopia, Somalia, Kenya, Uganda, Tanzania and Malawi.

The length of the forewings is about 45 mm for males.
