= Acantuerta thomensis =

Scientific classification
- Domain: Eukaryota
- Kingdom: Animalia
- Phylum: Arthropoda
- Class: Insecta
- Order: Lepidoptera
- Superfamily: Noctuoidea
- Family: Noctuidae
- Genus: Acantuerta
- Species: A. thomensis

Binomial name
- Acantuerta thomensis Jordan, 1904

Synonyms
- Tuerta thomensis Jordan, 1904; Acantuerta thomensis Hampson, 1907; Aegocera thomensis Jordan, 1913

Species of moth

Acantuerta thomensis is a species of moth in the genus Acantuerta of the family Noctuidae. It is found on the São Tomé Island.
