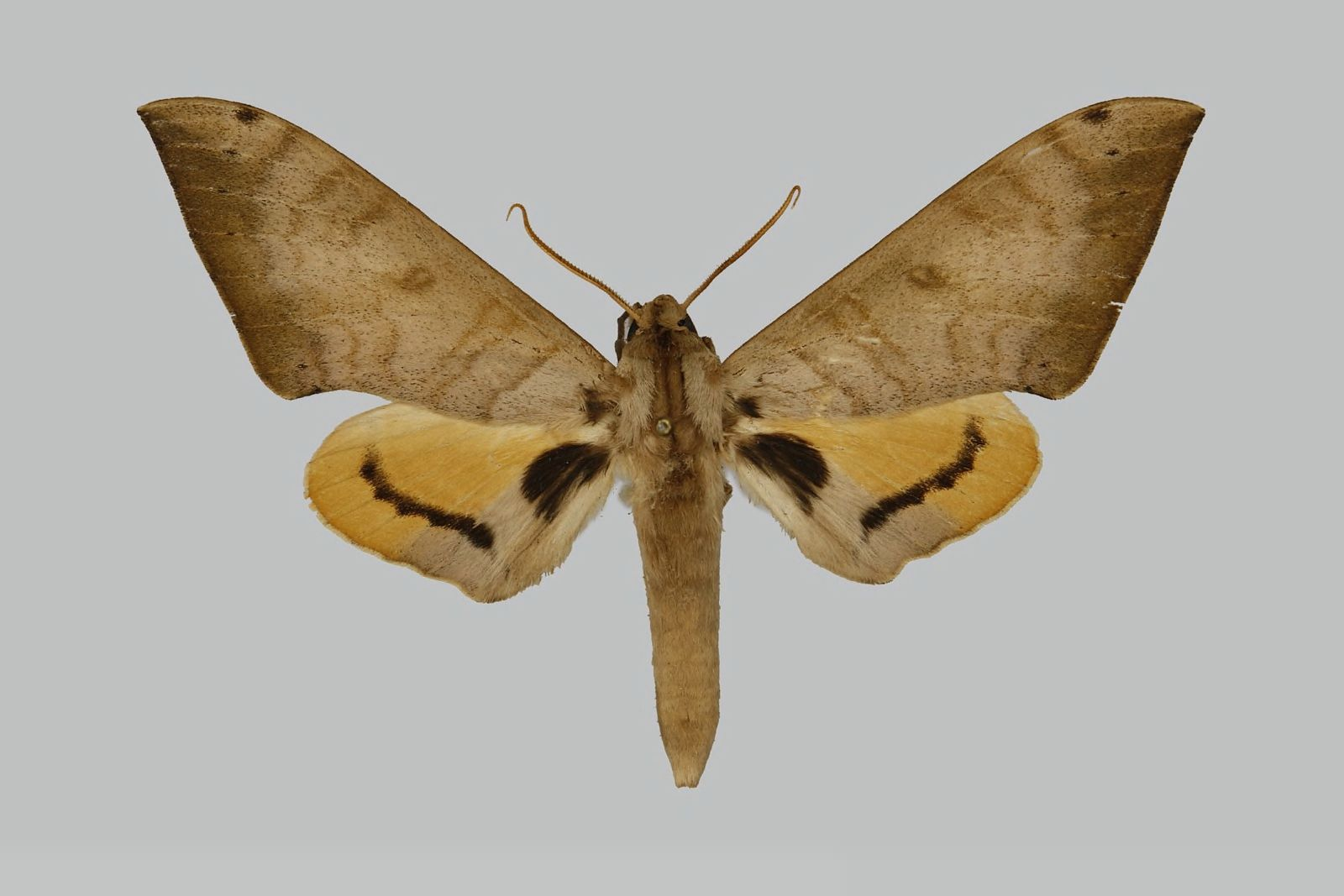
- male type

Scientific classification
- Domain: Eukaryota
- Kingdom: Animalia
- Phylum: Arthropoda
- Class: Insecta
- Order: Lepidoptera
- Family: Sphingidae
- Genus: Pseudoclanis
- Species: P. tomensis

Binomial name
- Pseudoclanis tomensis Pierre, 1992
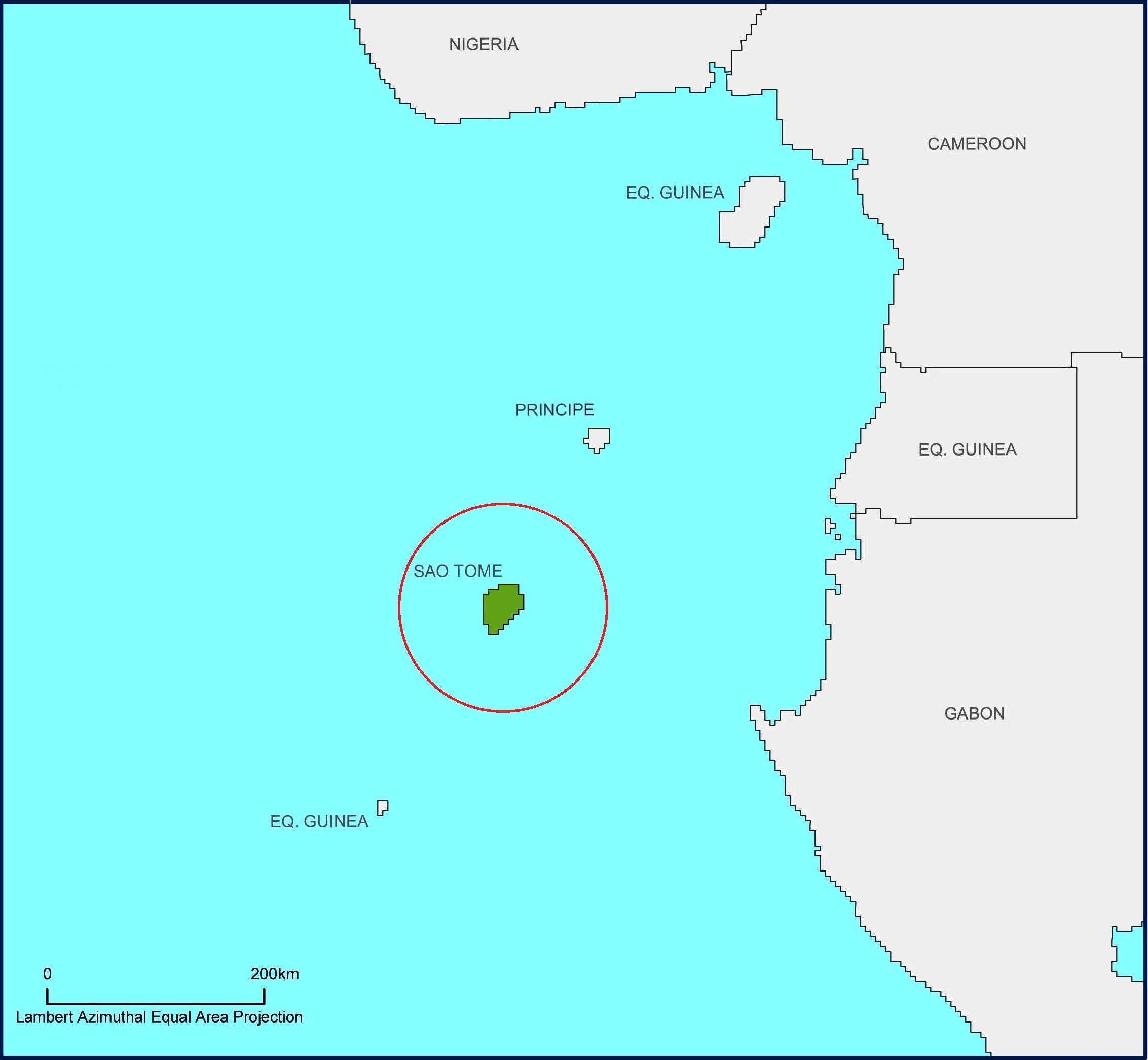
- range

= Pseudoclanis tomensis =

Species of moth

Pseudoclanis tomensis is a species of hawkmoth of the family Sphingidae. It occurs on the island of São Tomé. It was first described by Jacques Pierre in 1992.

The wingspan is about 65 mm for males. The forewing upperside is very similar to Pseudoclanis postica but with a broad, dark marginal band. The hindwing upperside is bright yellow with a very straight median line.
