= Stenandrium thomense =

Scientific classification
- Kingdom: Plantae
- Clade: Tracheophytes
- Clade: Angiosperms
- Clade: Eudicots
- Clade: Asterids
- Order: Lamiales
- Family: Acanthaceae
- Genus: Stenandrium
- Species: S. thomense

Binomial name
- Stenandrium thomense (Milne-Redh.) Heine

Synonyms
- Crossandra thomensis Milne-Redh.; Stenandriopsis thomensis (Milne-Redh.) Heine

Species of plant

Stenandrium thomense, synonym Stenandriopsis thomensis, is a species of flowering plants of the family Acanthaceae. It is a low herb with purple flowers. The leaves are white beneath. It occurs in Nigeria, Cameroon and São Tomé and Príncipe. It was first described as Crossandra thomensis in 1935 by Milne-Redhead.
