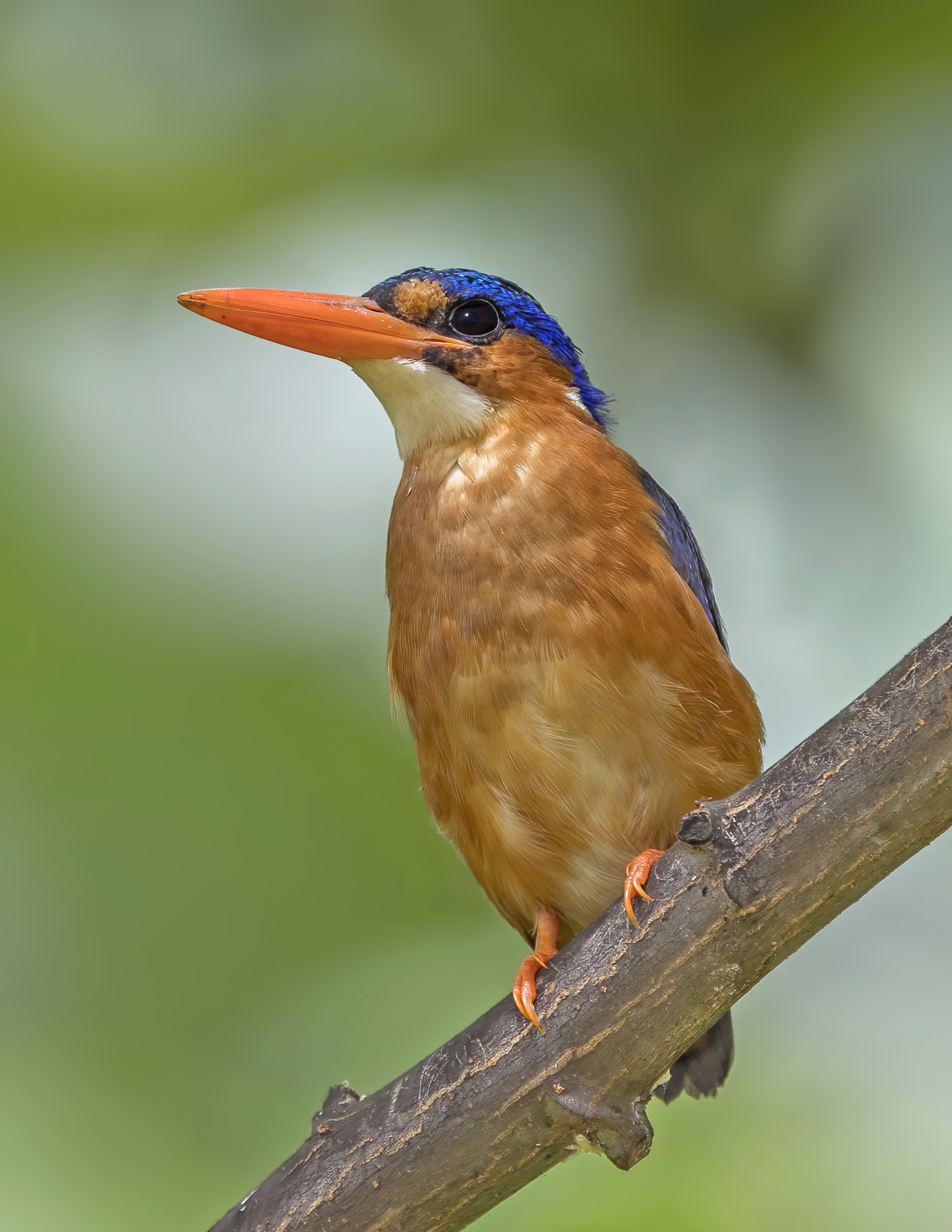

Conservation status
- Least Concern (IUCN 3.1)

Scientific classification
- Kingdom: Animalia
- Phylum: Chordata
- Class: Aves
- Order: Coraciiformes
- Family: Alcedinidae
- Subfamily: Alcedininae
- Genus: Corythornis
- Species: C. cristatus
- Subspecies: C. c. thomensis

Trinomial name
- Corythornis cristatus thomensis (Salvadori, 1902)

Synonyms
- Alcedo thomensis

= São Tomé kingfisher =

Subspecies of bird

The São Tomé kingfisher (Corythornis cristatus thomensis) is a bird in the family Alcedinidae. It is endemic to São Tomé, an island off the west coast of Africa in the Gulf of Guinea and was first described by the Italian ornithologist Tommaso Salvadori in 1902 under the binomial name Corythornis thomensis. A molecular phylogenetic study published in 2008 showed that the São Tomé kingfisher is a subspecies of the malachite kingfisher.

Its habitat includes forest, inland wetlands, marine intertidal areas, marine coastal areas, and urban areas.
