= Acantuerta =

Scientific classification
- Domain: Eukaryota
- Kingdom: Animalia
- Phylum: Arthropoda
- Class: Insecta
- Order: Lepidoptera
- Superfamily: Noctuoidea
- Family: Noctuidae
- Subfamily: Agaristinae
- Genus: Acantuerta

Genus of moths

Acantuerta is a genus of moths of the subfamily Agaristinae of the family Noctuidae.

== Species ==
- Acantuerta ladina Jordan, 1926
- Acantuerta thomensis Jordan, 1904
