= Eunidia thomensis =

Scientific classification
- Kingdom: Animalia
- Phylum: Arthropoda
- Clade: Pancrustacea
- Class: Insecta
- Order: Coleoptera
- Suborder: Polyphaga
- Infraorder: Cucujiformia
- Family: Cerambycidae
- Genus: Eunidia
- Species: E. thomensis

Binomial name
- Eunidia thomensis Breuning, 1970

Species of beetle

Eunidia thomensis is a species of beetle in the family Cerambycidae. It was described by Stephan von Breuning in 1970. It occurs in the island of São Tomé.
