= Disparctia thomensis =

Scientific classification
- Domain: Eukaryota
- Kingdom: Animalia
- Phylum: Arthropoda
- Class: Insecta
- Order: Lepidoptera
- Superfamily: Noctuoidea
- Family: Erebidae
- Subfamily: Arctiinae
- Genus: Disparctia
- Species: D. thomensis

Binomial name
- Disparctia thomensis (Joicey & Talbot, 1926)

Synonyms
- Creatonotos thomensis Joicey & Talbot, 1926

Species of moth

Disparctia thomensis is a moth species of the family Erebidae. It was described by James John Joicey and George Talbot in 1926. It is found on São Tomé Island off the western equatorial coast of Central Africa.
