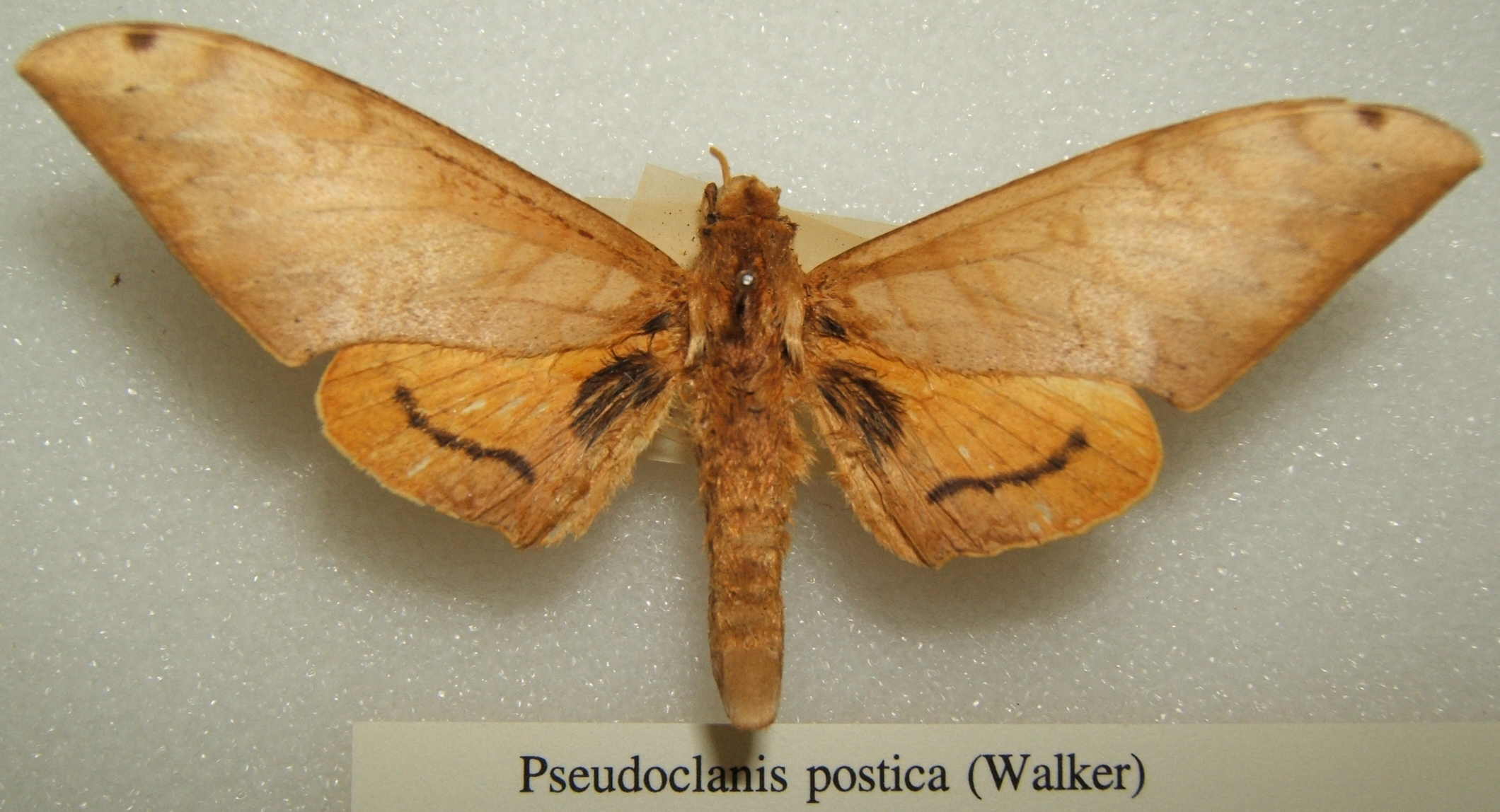

Scientific classification
- Domain: Eukaryota
- Kingdom: Animalia
- Phylum: Arthropoda
- Class: Insecta
- Order: Lepidoptera
- Family: Sphingidae
- Genus: Pseudoclanis
- Species: P. postica

Binomial name
- Pseudoclanis postica (Walker, 1856)

Synonyms
- Basiana postica Walker, 1856

= Pseudoclanis postica =

Species of moth

Pseudoclanis postica is a moth of the family Sphingidae first described by Francis Walker in 1856. It is known from South Africa and Zimbabwe.

The wingspan is 73–95 mm.

The larvae feed on Celtis species, Trema species, Chaetachme aristata, Ficus ingens.
