= Thomae =

Thomae may refer to:

== People ==
- Carl Johannes Thomae (1840-1921), German mathematician
- Stephan Thomae (born 1968), German politician

== Biota ==
- Adaina thomae, a moth species
- Batocera thomae, a beetle species
- Plusiodonta thomae, a moth species of the genus Plusiodonta
- Bursa rhodostoma thomae, a sea snail subspecies of Bursa rhodostoma

== Synonyms ==
- Bursa thomae, a synonym of Bursa rhodostoma thomae
- Ranella thomae, a synonym of Bursa rhodostoma

== Other ==
- Thomae's function, a mathematical function in calculus
