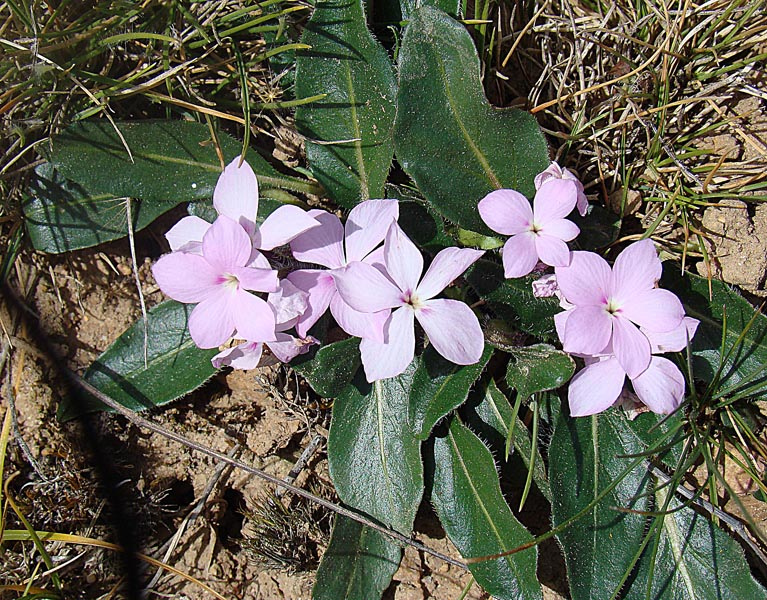
- Stenandrium dulce (sweet shaggytuft)

Scientific classification
- Kingdom: Plantae
- Clade: Embryophytes
- Clade: Tracheophytes
- Clade: Angiosperms
- Clade: Eudicots
- Clade: Asterids
- Order: Lamiales
- Family: Acanthaceae
- Subfamily: Acanthoideae
- Tribe: Acantheae
- Genus: Stenandrium; Nees (1836), nom. cons.

Synonyms
- Caldenbachia Pohl ex Nees (1847); Gerardia L. (1753), nom. rej.

= Stenandrium =

Genus of flowering plants

Stenandrium is a genus of flowering plants, commonly known as shaggytuft, in the family Acanthaceae, with 50 species of perennial herbs ranging from the southern United States to northern Argentina and central Chile.

== History ==
When Carl Linnaeus published the first classification of plants using binomial nomenclature in 1753, he included five species of North American flowers under the genus Gerardia. By 1810, botanists had realized that one of these species, G. tuberosa, was distinctly different from the other four, but disagreed upon the proper resolution. It would remain controversial until the 1950s, when Stenandrium was selected as the official name of the genus including Gerardia tuberosa (now known as Stenandrium tuberosum), while the opposing genus in Orobanchaceae was formally typified under the name Agalinis.

== Species ==
50 species are accepted.

- Stenandrium acuminatum Urb.
- Stenandrium affine S.Moore
- Stenandrium andrei (Leonard) Wassh.
- Stenandrium arnoldii H.Dietr.
- Stenandrium bracteosum (Britton & Millsp.) Britton ex Leonard
- Stenandrium carolinae (Benoist) Vollesen
- Stenandrium chameranthemoideum Oerst.
- Stenandrium corymbosum Nees
- Stenandrium crenatum Urb.
- Stenandrium diamantinense Zanatta & Kameyama
- Stenandrium diphyllum Nees
- Stenandrium droseroides Nees
- Stenandrium dulce (Cav.) Nees
- Stenandrium ekmanii Urb.
- Stenandrium elegans Nees
- Stenandrium eustachyum Zanatta & Proença
- Stenandrium fosbergii (Leonard) Wassh.
- Stenandrium goiasense Wassh.
- Stenandrium harlingii Wassh.
- Stenandrium hatschbachii Wassh.
- Stenandrium heterotrichum Borhidi
- Stenandrium hirsutum Nees & Mart.
- Stenandrium humboldtianum Nees
- Stenandrium irwinii Wassh.
- Stenandrium lyonii J.R.Johnst.
- Stenandrium manchonense T.F.Daniel
- Stenandrium mandioccanum Nees
- Stenandrium nanum (Standl.) T.F.Daniel
- Stenandrium nephoica (Wassh.) Wassh.
- Stenandrium ovatum Urb.
- Stenandrium pallidum H.Dietr.
- Stenandrium pedunculatum (Donn.Sm.) Leonard
- Stenandrium pilosulum (S.F.Blake) T.F.Daniel
- Stenandrium pinetorum (Britton & P.Wilson) Alain
- Stenandrium pohlii Nees
- Stenandrium praecox S. Moore
- Stenandrium radicosum Nees
- Stenandrium riedelianum Nees
- Stenandrium scabrosum (Sw.) Nees
- Stenandrium serpens Nees
- Stenandrium stenophyllum Kameyama
- Stenandrium subcordatum Standl.
- Stenandrium tenellum Nees
- Stenandrium tuberosum (L.) Urb.
- Stenandrium undulatum Urb. & Ekman
- Stenandrium verticillatum Brandegee
- Stenandrium villarroelii J.R.I.Wood
- Stenandrium villosum Nees
- Stenandrium wrightii Lindau
