= Lattinella palliolatus =

Scientific classification
- Domain: Eukaryota
- Kingdom: Animalia
- Phylum: Arthropoda
- Subphylum: Chelicerata
- Class: Arachnida
- Order: Mesostigmata
- Family: Parholaspididae
- Genus: Lattinella
- Species: L. palliolatus

Binomial name
- Lattinella palliolatus Tseng, 1993

Species of mite

Lattinella palliolatus is a species of mite in the family Parholaspididae.
