= Holaspina alstoni =

Scientific classification
- Domain: Eukaryota
- Kingdom: Animalia
- Phylum: Arthropoda
- Subphylum: Chelicerata
- Class: Arachnida
- Order: Mesostigmata
- Family: Parholaspididae
- Genus: Holaspina
- Species: H. alstoni

Binomial name
- Holaspina alstoni (Evans, 1956)

Species of mite

Holaspina alstoni is a species of mite in the family Parholaspididae.
