= Holaspulus reticulatus =

Scientific classification
- Domain: Eukaryota
- Kingdom: Animalia
- Phylum: Arthropoda
- Subphylum: Chelicerata
- Class: Arachnida
- Order: Mesostigmata
- Family: Parholaspididae
- Genus: Holaspulus
- Species: H. reticulatus

Binomial name
- Holaspulus reticulatus Ishikawa, 1994

Species of mite

Holaspulus reticulatus is a species of mite in the family Parholaspididae.
