= Neparholaspis =

Scientific classification
- Domain: Eukaryota
- Kingdom: Animalia
- Phylum: Arthropoda
- Subphylum: Chelicerata
- Class: Arachnida
- Order: Mesostigmata
- Family: Parholaspididae
- Genus: Neparholaspis; Evans, 1956

Genus of mites

Neparholaspis is a genus of mites in the family Parholaspididae. There are about nine described species in Neparholaspis.

== Species ==
These nine species belong to the genus Neparholaspis:

- Neparholaspis cardioides Petrova, 1977
- Neparholaspis dubatolovi
- Neparholaspis evansi Krantz, 1960
- Neparholaspis longilingulatus Tseng, 1993
- Neparholaspis monticola Ishikawa, 1979
- Neparholaspis serratichela Ishikawa, 1979
- Neparholaspis serrtichela Ishikawa, 1967
- Neparholaspis shinanonis Ishikawa, 1979
- Neparholaspis unicus Petrova, 1967
