= Gamasholaspis malacus =

Scientific classification
- Domain: Eukaryota
- Kingdom: Animalia
- Phylum: Arthropoda
- Subphylum: Chelicerata
- Class: Arachnida
- Order: Mesostigmata
- Family: Parholaspididae
- Genus: Gamasholaspis
- Species: G. malacus

Binomial name
- Gamasholaspis malacus Tseng, 1993

Species of mite

Gamasholaspis malacus is a species of mite in the family Parholaspididae.
