= Hyattolaspina =

Scientific classification
- Kingdom: Animalia
- Phylum: Arthropoda
- Subphylum: Chelicerata
- Class: Arachnida
- Order: Mesostigmata
- Family: Parholaspididae
- Genus: Hyattolaspina; Datta & Bhattacharjee, 1991

Binomial name
- Hyattolaspina hiteni

Genus of mites

Hyattolaspina is a genus of mites belonging to the family Parholaspididae. The only species that belongs to this genus is Hyattolaspina hiteni making this genus monotypic. It is native to India.
