= Holaspulus serratus =

Scientific classification
- Domain: Eukaryota
- Kingdom: Animalia
- Phylum: Arthropoda
- Subphylum: Chelicerata
- Class: Arachnida
- Order: Mesostigmata
- Family: Parholaspididae
- Genus: Holaspulus
- Species: H. serratus

Binomial name
- Holaspulus serratus Ishikawa, 1979

Species of mite

Holaspulus serratus is a species of mite in the family Parholaspididae.
