= Holaspulus =

Scientific classification
- Domain: Eukaryota
- Kingdom: Animalia
- Phylum: Arthropoda
- Subphylum: Chelicerata
- Class: Arachnida
- Order: Mesostigmata
- Family: Parholaspididae
- Genus: Holaspulus; Berlese, 1904

Genus of mites

Holaspulus is a genus of mites in the family Parholaspididae. There are about 16 described species in Holaspulus.

== Species ==
These 15 species belong to the genus Holaspulus:

- Holaspulus apoensis Ishikawa, 1993
- Holaspulus epistomatus Ishikawa, 1993
- Holaspulus formosanus Tseng, 1993
- Holaspulus ishigakiensis Ishikawa, 1994
- Holaspulus luzonicus Ishikawa, 1993
- Holaspulus orientalis Tseng, 1993
- Holaspulus palawanensis Ishikawa, 1993
- Holaspulus primitivus Ishikawa, 1993
- Holaspulus reticulatus Ishikawa, 1994
- Holaspulus sclerus Ishikawa, 1993
- Holaspulus serratus Ishikawa, 1979
- Holaspulus silvestris Ishikawa, 1993
- Holaspulus subtropicus Tseng, 1993
- Holaspulus tenuipes Berlese
- Holaspulus tweediei Evans
