= Holaspulus palawanensis =

Scientific classification
- Kingdom: Animalia
- Phylum: Arthropoda
- Subphylum: Chelicerata
- Class: Arachnida
- Order: Mesostigmata
- Family: Parholaspididae
- Genus: Holaspulus
- Species: H. palawanensis

Binomial name
- Holaspulus palawanensis Ishikawa, 1993

Species of mite

Holaspulus palawanensis is a species of mite in the family Parholaspididae. First described by Japanese acarologist Kazuo Ishikawa in 1993, Holaspulus palawanensis is known exclusively from Palawan Island in the Philippines, with the type locality in the Olangan Valley between Puerto Princesa and Iwahig.
