= Parholaspis meridionalis =

Scientific classification
- Domain: Eukaryota
- Kingdom: Animalia
- Phylum: Arthropoda
- Subphylum: Chelicerata
- Class: Arachnida
- Order: Mesostigmata
- Family: Parholaspididae
- Genus: Parholaspis
- Species: P. meridionalis

Binomial name
- Parholaspis meridionalis Ishikawa, 1980

Species of mite

Parholaspis meridionalis is a species of mite in the family Parholaspididae.
