= Gamasholaspis browningi =

Scientific classification
- Kingdom: Animalia
- Phylum: Arthropoda
- Subphylum: Chelicerata
- Class: Arachnida
- Order: Mesostigmata
- Family: Parholaspididae
- Genus: Gamasholaspis
- Species: G. browningi

Binomial name
- Gamasholaspis browningi (Bregetova & Koroleva)

Species of mite

Gamasholaspis browningi is a species of mite in the family Parholaspididae.

== Distribution ==
The species is Middle-Eastern. Specimens have been gathered from both Iran and Turkey.
