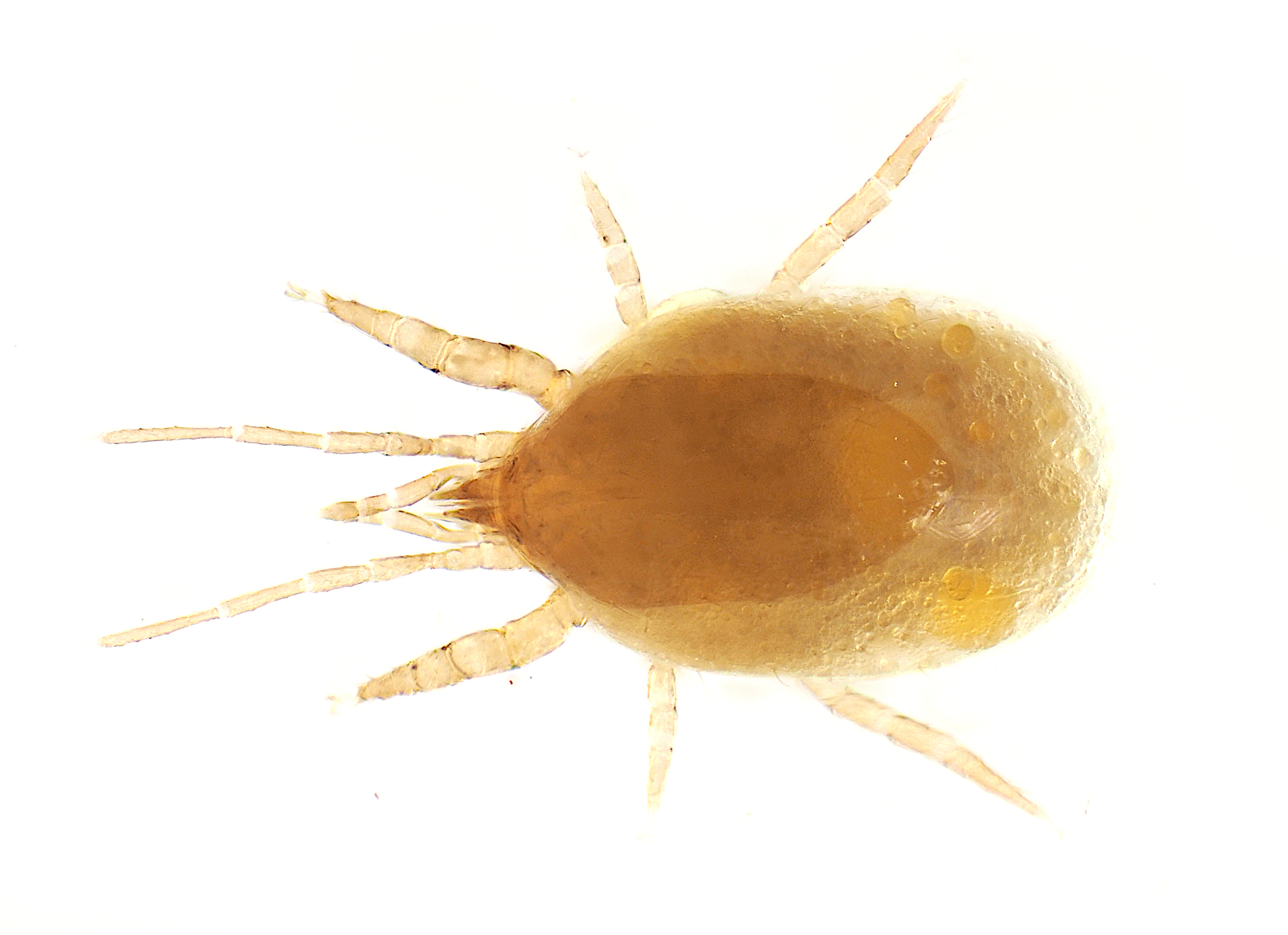

Scientific classification
- Domain: Eukaryota
- Kingdom: Animalia
- Phylum: Arthropoda
- Subphylum: Chelicerata
- Class: Arachnida
- Order: Mesostigmata
- Family: Parholaspididae
- Genus: Gamasholaspis; Berlese, 1904

= Gamasholaspis =

Genus of mites

Gamasholaspis is a genus of mites in the family Parholaspididae. There are about 15 described species in the genus Gamasholaspis.

== Species ==
These 15 species belong to the genus Gamasholaspis:

- Gamasholaspis anmashanensis Tseng, 1993
- Gamasholaspis babettae Petrova, 1977
- Gamasholaspis blandus Tseng, 1993
- Gamasholaspis browningi (Bregetova & Koroleva)
- Gamasholaspis communis Petrova, 1967
- Gamasholaspis convexus Tseng, 1993
- Gamasholaspis formosus Tseng, 1993
- Gamasholaspis gamasoides (Berlese)
- Gamasholaspis incisus Petrova, 1968
- Gamasholaspis lingulatus Tseng, 1993
- Gamasholaspis malacus Tseng, 1993
- Gamasholaspis nonunguis Tseng, 1993
- Gamasholaspis pygmaeus Ishikawa, 1980
- Gamasholaspis serratus Ishikawa, 1980
- Gamasholaspis variabilis Petrova, 1967
