= Gamasholaspis anmashanensis =

Scientific classification
- Domain: Eukaryota
- Kingdom: Animalia
- Phylum: Arthropoda
- Subphylum: Chelicerata
- Class: Arachnida
- Order: Mesostigmata
- Family: Parholaspididae
- Genus: Gamasholaspis
- Species: G. anmashanensis

Binomial name
- Gamasholaspis anmashanensis Tseng, 1993

Species of mite

Gamasholaspis anmashanensis is a species of mite in the family Parholaspididae.
