= Proparholaspulus suzukii =

Scientific classification
- Domain: Eukaryota
- Kingdom: Animalia
- Phylum: Arthropoda
- Subphylum: Chelicerata
- Class: Arachnida
- Order: Mesostigmata
- Family: Parholaspididae
- Genus: Proparholaspulus
- Species: P. suzukii

Binomial name
- Proparholaspulus suzukii Ishikawa, 1980

Species of mite

Proparholaspulus suzukii is a species of mite in the family Parholaspididae.
