= Neparholaspis monticola =

Scientific classification
- Domain: Eukaryota
- Kingdom: Animalia
- Phylum: Arthropoda
- Subphylum: Chelicerata
- Class: Arachnida
- Order: Mesostigmata
- Family: Parholaspididae
- Genus: Neparholaspis
- Species: N. monticola

Binomial name
- Neparholaspis monticola Ishikawa, 1979

Species of mite

Neparholaspis monticola is a species of mite in the family Parholaspididae.
