= Parholaspididae =

Scientific classification
- Kingdom: Animalia
- Phylum: Arthropoda
- Subphylum: Chelicerata
- Class: Arachnida
- Order: Mesostigmata
- Suborder: Monogynaspida
- Infraorder: Gamasina
- Superfamily: Eviphidoidea
- Family: Parholaspididae; Evans, 1956

Genera
- Gamasholaspis Berlese, 1903; Holaspina Berlese, 1916; Holaspulus Berlese, 1904; Hyattolaspina A. K. Datta & P. C. Bhattacharjee, 1991; Krantzholaspis Petrova, 1967; Krantzolaspina A. K. Datta & P. C. Bhattacharjee, 1988; Lattinella Krantz, 1960; Neparholaspis Evans, 1956; Parholaspella Krantz, 1960; Parholaspis Berlese, 1918; Proparholaspulus K. Ishikawa, 1980; Snaveolaspis Johnston, 1969

Family of mites

Parholaspididae is a family of mites in the order Mesostigmata. There are 14 known genera in the family, with a distribution across the entire world. Species are found in a variety of habitats, including leaf litter, logs, moss, caves, mammal nests, and as early colonizers from habitat disturbance.

== Species ==
Gamasholaspis Berlese, 1903

- Gamasholaspis akimotoi (Ishikawa, 1966)
- Gamasholaspis anmashanensis Tseng, 1993
- Gamasholaspis blandus Tseng, 1993
- Gamasholaspis browningi (Bregetova & Koroleva, 1960)
- Gamasholaspis concavus Gu & Guo, 1996
- Gamasholaspis convexus Tseng, 1993
- Gamasholaspis duyunensis Chen, Guo & Gui, 1994
- Gamasholaspis eothenomydis Gu, 1984
- Gamasholaspis formosus Tseng, 1993
- Gamasholaspis gamasoides Berlese, 1903
- Gamasholaspis khaoyaiensis Ishikawa & Saichuae, 1997
- Gamasholaspis linae Petrova, 1977
- Gamasholaspis lingulatus Tseng, 1993
- Gamasholaspis malacus Tseng, 1993
- Gamasholaspis nonunguis Tseng, 1993
- Gamasholaspis paravariabilis Ma & Yin, 1999
- Gamasholaspis pygmaeus Ishikawa, 1980
- Gamasholaspis serratus Ishikawa, 1980
- Gamasholaspis uenoi Ishikawa, 1995

Holaspina Berlese, 1916

- Holaspina aboreus (Ishikawa, 1980)
- Holaspina alstoni (Evans, 1956)
- Holaspina bidentis (Tseng, 1993)
- Holaspina coalescens (Krantz, 1960)
- Holaspina comanatus (Tseng, 1993)
- Holaspina communis (Ishikawa, 1966)
- Holaspina cuneatus (Tseng, 1993)
- Holaspina dandongensis (Ma-Liming, 1998)
- Holaspina dentatus (Ishikawa, 1969)
- Holaspina extremiorientalis (Ishikawa, 1980)
- Holaspina hohuanshanensis (Tseng, 1993)
- Holaspina kentinus (Tseng, 1993)
- Holaspina liaoningensis (Ma-Liming, 1998)
- Holaspina marinus (Ishikawa, 1980)
- Holaspina maunaloaensis (Tenerio & Marshall, 1977)
- Holaspina multidentatus (Ishikawa, 1980)
- Holaspina muscorum (Ewing, 1909)
- Holaspina oblongus (Tseng, 1993)
- Holaspina ochraceus (Ishikawa)
- Holaspina paralstoni (Yin & Bei, 1993)
- Holaspina qianshanensis (Yin & Bei, 1993)
- Holaspina sanlinchiensis (Tseng, 1993)
- Holaspina schusteri (Hirschmann, 1966)
- Holaspina serratus (Ishikawa, 1967)
- Holaspina solimani (Metwali, 1983)
- Holaspina tantus (Tseng, 1993)
- Holaspina tenuipes (Berlese, 1904)
- Holaspina trifurcatus (Ishikawa)
- Holaspina tweediei (Evans, 1956)
- Holaspina uozumii (Ishikawa, 2002)
- Holaspina yakushimaensis (Ishikawa, 1980)

Holaspulus Berlese, 1904

- Holaspulus aculeatus Karg, 1994
- Holaspulus apoensis Ishikawa, 1993
- Holaspulus confusus Halliday, 1995
- Holaspulus epistomatus Ishikawa, 1993
- Holaspulus formosanus Tseng, 1993
- Holaspulus ishigakiensis Ishikawa, 1994
- Holaspulus luzonicus Ishikawa, 1993
- Holaspulus montanus Ishikawa, 1995
- Holaspulus omogoensis Ishikawa, 1995
- Holaspulus orientalis Tseng, 1993
- Holaspulus palawanensis Ishikawa, 1993
- Holaspulus primitivus Ishikawa, 1993
- Holaspulus reticulatus Ishikawa, 1994
- Holaspulus sclerus Ishikawa, 1993
- Holaspulus serratus Ishikawa, 1979
- Holaspulus silvestris Ishikawa, 1993
- Holaspulus subtropicus Tseng, 1993
- Holaspulus tenuipes Berlese, 1904

Hyattolaspina A. K. Datta & P. C. Bhattacharjee, 1991

- Hyattolaspina hiteni A. K. Datta & P. C. Bhattacharjee, 1991

Krantzholaspis Petrova, 1967

- Krantzholaspis ussuriensis Petrova, 1967

Krantzolaspina A. K. Datta & P. C. Bhattacharjee, 1988

- Krantzolaspina rebatii A. K. Datta & P. C. Bhattacharjee, 1988

Lattinella Krantz, 1960

- Lattinella capizzii Krantz, 1960
- Lattinella palliolatus (Tseng, 1993)

Neparholaspis Evans, 1956

- Neparholaspis bisunensis Lee & Lee, 2000
- Neparholaspis chenpengi Ma & Yin, 1999
- Neparholaspis longiligulatus Tseng, 1993
- Neparholaspis monticola Ishikawa, 1979
- Neparholaspis serratichela Ishikawa, 1979
- Neparholaspis shinanonis Ishikawa, 1979
- Neparholaspis spathulatus Evans, 1956
- Neparholaspis subarcuatus Ma & Yan, 2001

Parholaspella Krantz, 1960

- Parholaspella spatulata Krantz, 1960

Parholaspis Berlese, 1918

- Parholaspis desertus Berlese, 1918
- Parholaspis meridionalis Ishikawa, 1980
- Parholaspis squameus Tseng, 1993
- Parholaspis wuhanensis Ma & Yan, 2001

Proparholaspulus K. Ishikawa, 1980

- Proparholaspulus angustatus Ishikawa, 1987
- Proparholaspulus ishikawai Liang & Hu, 1993
- Proparholaspulus montanus Ishikawa, 1987
- Proparholaspulus suzukii K. Ishikawa, 1980

Snaveolaspis Johnston, 1969

- Snaveolaspis parvilobatus (Krantz, 1960)
