= Parholaspis =

Scientific classification
- Domain: Eukaryota
- Kingdom: Animalia
- Phylum: Arthropoda
- Subphylum: Chelicerata
- Class: Arachnida
- Order: Mesostigmata
- Family: Parholaspididae
- Genus: Parholaspis; Berlese, 1918

Genus of mites

Parholaspis is a genus of mites in the family Parholaspididae. There are at least four described species in Parholaspis.

== Species ==
These four species belong to the genus Parholaspis:

- Parholaspis caelebs Vitzthum, 1926
- Parholaspis kewensis Evans, 1956
- Parholaspis meridionalis Ishikawa, 1980
- Parholaspis squameus Tseng, 1993
