= Parholaspella =

Scientific classification
- Domain: Eukaryota
- Kingdom: Animalia
- Phylum: Arthropoda
- Subphylum: Chelicerata
- Class: Arachnida
- Order: Mesostigmata
- Family: Parholaspididae
- Genus: Parholaspella; Krantz, 1960

Genus of mites

Parholaspella is a genus of mites in the family Parholaspididae.
