= Gamasholaspis convexus =

Scientific classification
- Domain: Eukaryota
- Kingdom: Animalia
- Phylum: Arthropoda
- Subphylum: Chelicerata
- Class: Arachnida
- Order: Mesostigmata
- Family: Parholaspididae
- Genus: Gamasholaspis
- Species: G. convexus

Binomial name
- Gamasholaspis convexus Tseng, 1993

Species of mite

Gamasholaspis convexus is a species of mite in the family Parholaspididae.
