= Krantzholaspis =

Scientific classification
- Domain: Eukaryota
- Kingdom: Animalia
- Phylum: Arthropoda
- Subphylum: Chelicerata
- Class: Arachnida
- Order: Mesostigmata
- Family: Parholaspididae
- Genus: Krantzholaspis; Petrova, 1967

Genus of mites

Krantzholaspis is a genus of mites in the family Parholaspididae.
