= Gamasholaspis pygmaeus =

Scientific classification
- Domain: Eukaryota
- Kingdom: Animalia
- Phylum: Arthropoda
- Subphylum: Chelicerata
- Class: Arachnida
- Order: Mesostigmata
- Family: Parholaspididae
- Genus: Gamasholaspis
- Species: G. pygmaeus

Binomial name
- Gamasholaspis pygmaeus Ishikawa, 1980

Species of mite

Gamasholaspis pygmaeus is a species of mite in the family Parholaspididae.
