= Holaspulus subtropicus =

Scientific classification
- Domain: Eukaryota
- Kingdom: Animalia
- Phylum: Arthropoda
- Subphylum: Chelicerata
- Class: Arachnida
- Order: Mesostigmata
- Family: Parholaspididae
- Genus: Holaspulus
- Species: H. subtropicus

Binomial name
- Holaspulus subtropicus Tseng, 1993

Species of mite

Holaspulus subtropicus is a species of mite in the family Parholaspididae.
