= Proparholaspulus =

Scientific classification
- Domain: Eukaryota
- Kingdom: Animalia
- Phylum: Arthropoda
- Subphylum: Chelicerata
- Class: Arachnida
- Order: Mesostigmata
- Family: Parholaspididae
- Genus: Proparholaspulus; Ishikawa, 1980

Genus of mites

Proparholaspulus is a genus of mites in the family Parholaspididae. There are at least three described species in Proparholaspulus.

== Species ==
These three species belong to the genus Proparholaspulus:

- Proparholaspulus angustatus Ishikawa, 1987
- Proparholaspulus montanus Ishikawa, 1987
- Proparholaspulus suzukii Ishikawa, 1980
