= Holaspina =

Scientific classification
- Domain: Eukaryota
- Kingdom: Animalia
- Phylum: Arthropoda
- Subphylum: Chelicerata
- Class: Arachnida
- Order: Mesostigmata
- Family: Parholaspididae
- Genus: Holaspina; Berlese, 1917
- Species: H. alstoni

Binomial name
- Holaspina alstoni (Evans, 1956)

Genus of mites

Holaspina is a genus of mites in the family Parholaspididae. There is at least one described species in Holaspina, H. alstoni.
