= Lattinella =

Scientific classification
- Domain: Eukaryota
- Kingdom: Animalia
- Phylum: Arthropoda
- Subphylum: Chelicerata
- Class: Arachnida
- Order: Mesostigmata
- Family: Parholaspididae
- Genus: Lattinella; Krantz, 1960
- Species: L. palliolatus

Binomial name
- Lattinella palliolatus Tseng, 1993

Genus of mites

Lattinella is a genus of mites in the family Parholaspididae. There is at least one described species in Lattinella, L. palliolatus.
