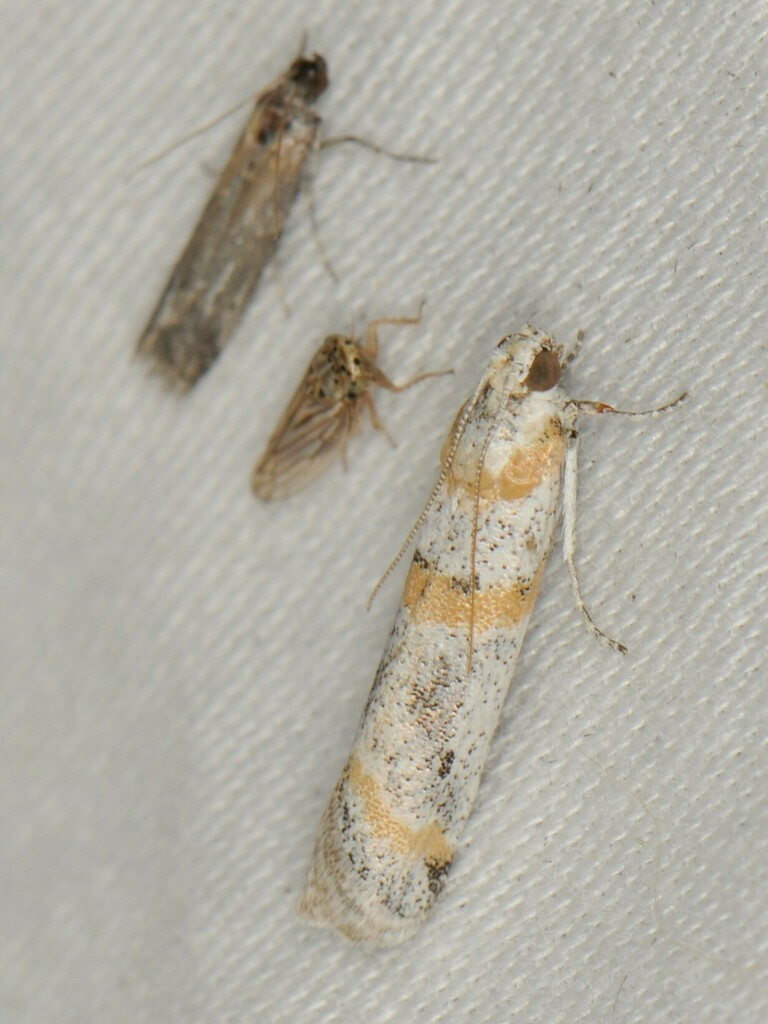

Scientific classification
- Kingdom: Animalia
- Phylum: Arthropoda
- Clade: Pancrustacea
- Class: Insecta
- Order: Lepidoptera
- Family: Pyralidae
- Genus: Acroncosa
- Species: A. castrella

Binomial name
- Acroncosa castrella Barnes & McDunnough, 1917

= Acroncosa castrella =

Species of moth

Acroncosa castrella is a species of snout moth in the genus Acroncosa. It was described by William Barnes and James Halliday McDunnough in 1917. It is found in North America, including the type location of New Mexico.

== Taxonomy ==
It was previously treated as a subspecies of Acroncosa albiflavella.
