= Oryctometopia =

Scientific classification
- Domain: Eukaryota
- Kingdom: Animalia
- Phylum: Arthropoda
- Class: Insecta
- Order: Lepidoptera
- Family: Pyralidae
- Subfamily: Phycitinae
- Genus: Oryctometopia; Ragonot, 1888

Genus of moths

Oryctometopia is a genus of moths of the family Pyralidae.

== Species ==
- Oryctometopia fossulatella Ragonot, 1888
- Oryctometopia venezuelensis Amsel, 1956
