= Homoeographa =

Scientific classification
- Domain: Eukaryota
- Kingdom: Animalia
- Phylum: Arthropoda
- Class: Insecta
- Order: Lepidoptera
- Family: Pyralidae
- Subfamily: Phycitinae
- Genus: Homoeographa; Ragonot, 1888

Synonyms
- Homeographa Whalley, 1970

Genus of moths

Homoeographa is a genus of snout moths described by Émile Louis Ragonot in 1888.

== Species ==
- Homoeographa lanceolella
- Homoeographa mexicana
