= Acroncosa =

Scientific classification
- Kingdom: Animalia
- Phylum: Arthropoda
- Clade: Pancrustacea
- Class: Insecta
- Order: Lepidoptera
- Family: Pyralidae
- Subfamily: Phycitinae
- Genus: Acroncosa; Barnes & McDunnough, 1917

Synonyms
- Acronca Neave, 1939

Genus of moths

Acroncosa is a genus of snout moths in the subfamily Phycitinae. It was described by William Barnes and James Halliday McDunnough in 1917. The type species is Acroncosa albiflavella.

== Species ==
- Acroncosa albiflavella Barnes & McDunnough, 1917
- Acroncosa castrella Barnes & McDunnough, 1917
- Acroncosa minima Neunzig, 2003
- Acroncosa similella Barnes & McDunnough, 1917
