= Asemeia =

Asemeia may refer to:

- Asemeia (moth) - a moth genus in the family Pyralidae
- Asemeia (plant) - a plant genus in the family Polygalaceae
