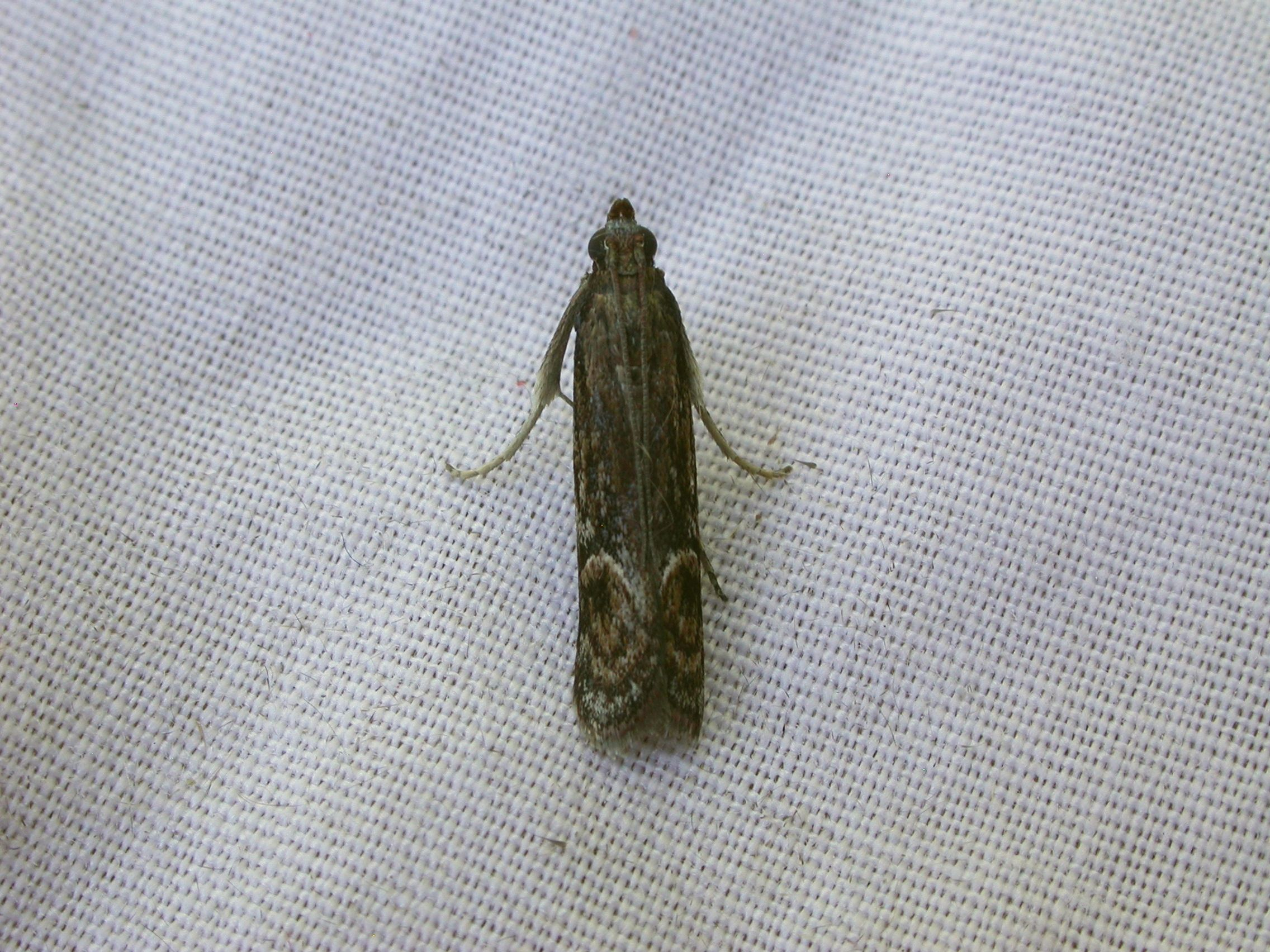

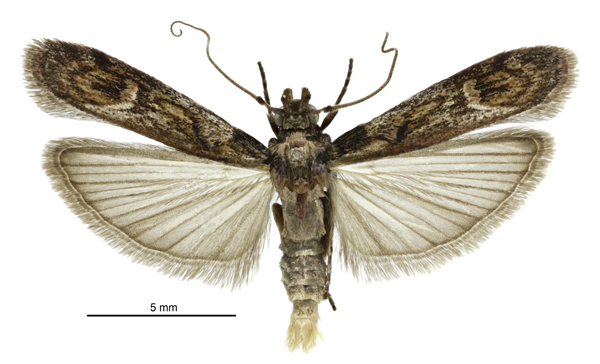

Scientific classification
- Kingdom: Animalia
- Phylum: Arthropoda
- Clade: Pancrustacea
- Class: Insecta
- Order: Lepidoptera
- Family: Pyralidae
- Subfamily: Phycitinae
- Genus: Balanomis; Meyrick, 1887
- Species: B. encyclia

Binomial name
- Balanomis encyclia Meyrick, 1887

= Balanomis =

Genus of moths

Balanomis is a monotypic snout moth genus described by Edward Meyrick in 1887. Its single species, described in the same publication, Balanomis encyclia, is found in Australia, including New South Wales. This species has also been introduced to New Zealand.

It was reared from native dodder (Cassytha paniculata).
