= Prorophora kazachstaniella =

Scientific classification
- Domain: Eukaryota
- Kingdom: Animalia
- Phylum: Arthropoda
- Class: Insecta
- Order: Lepidoptera
- Family: Pyralidae
- Genus: Prorophora
- Species: P. kazachstaniella

Binomial name
- Prorophora kazachstaniella Asselbergs, 2004

Species of moth

Prorophora kazachstaniella is a species of snout moth. It is found in Kazakhstan.
