= Gunungia capitirecava =

Scientific classification
- Domain: Eukaryota
- Kingdom: Animalia
- Phylum: Arthropoda
- Class: Insecta
- Order: Lepidoptera
- Family: Pyralidae
- Genus: Gunungia
- Species: G. capitirecava

Binomial name
- Gunungia capitirecava Ren & Li, 2007

Species of moth

Gunungia capitirecava is a species of snout moth in the genus Gunungia. It was described by Ying-Dang Ren and Hou-Hun Li in 2007 and is known from China.
