= Chorrera extrincica =

Scientific classification
- Domain: Eukaryota
- Kingdom: Animalia
- Phylum: Arthropoda
- Class: Insecta
- Order: Lepidoptera
- Family: Pyralidae
- Genus: Chorrera
- Species: C. extrincica

Binomial name
- Chorrera extrincica (Dyar, 1919)

Synonyms
- Rhodophaea extrincica Dyar, 1919

Species of moth

Chorrera extrincica is a species of snout moth in the genus Chorrera. It was described by Harrison Gray Dyar Jr. in 1919 and is found in the United States on the Florida Keys and Cuba.

The larvae feed on Waltheria indica.
