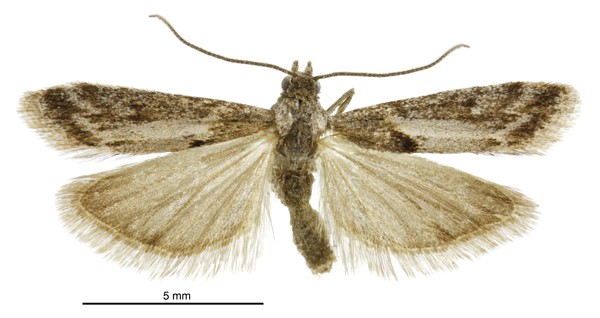
- Male

Conservation status
- Nationally Critical (NZ TCS)

Scientific classification
- Kingdom: Animalia
- Phylum: Arthropoda
- Clade: Pancrustacea
- Class: Insecta
- Order: Lepidoptera
- Family: Pyralidae
- Subfamily: Phycitinae
- Genus: Sporophyla; Meyrick, 1905
- Species: S. oenospora

Binomial name
- Sporophyla oenospora (Meyrick, 1897)

Synonyms
- Crocydopora oenospora Meyrick, 1897

= Sporophyla =

Genus of moths

Sporophyla oenospora is a species of moth in the family Pyralidae. It is the only species in the genus Sporophyla. It is endemic to New Zealand. It is classified as critically endangered by the Department of Conservation.

== Taxonomy ==
This species was first described by Edward Meyrick in 1897 under the name Crocydopora oenospora. The type specimen was collected at Castle Hill and is held in the Natural History Museum, London. George Vernon Hudson subsequently placed this species within the genus Sporophyla.

== Description ==
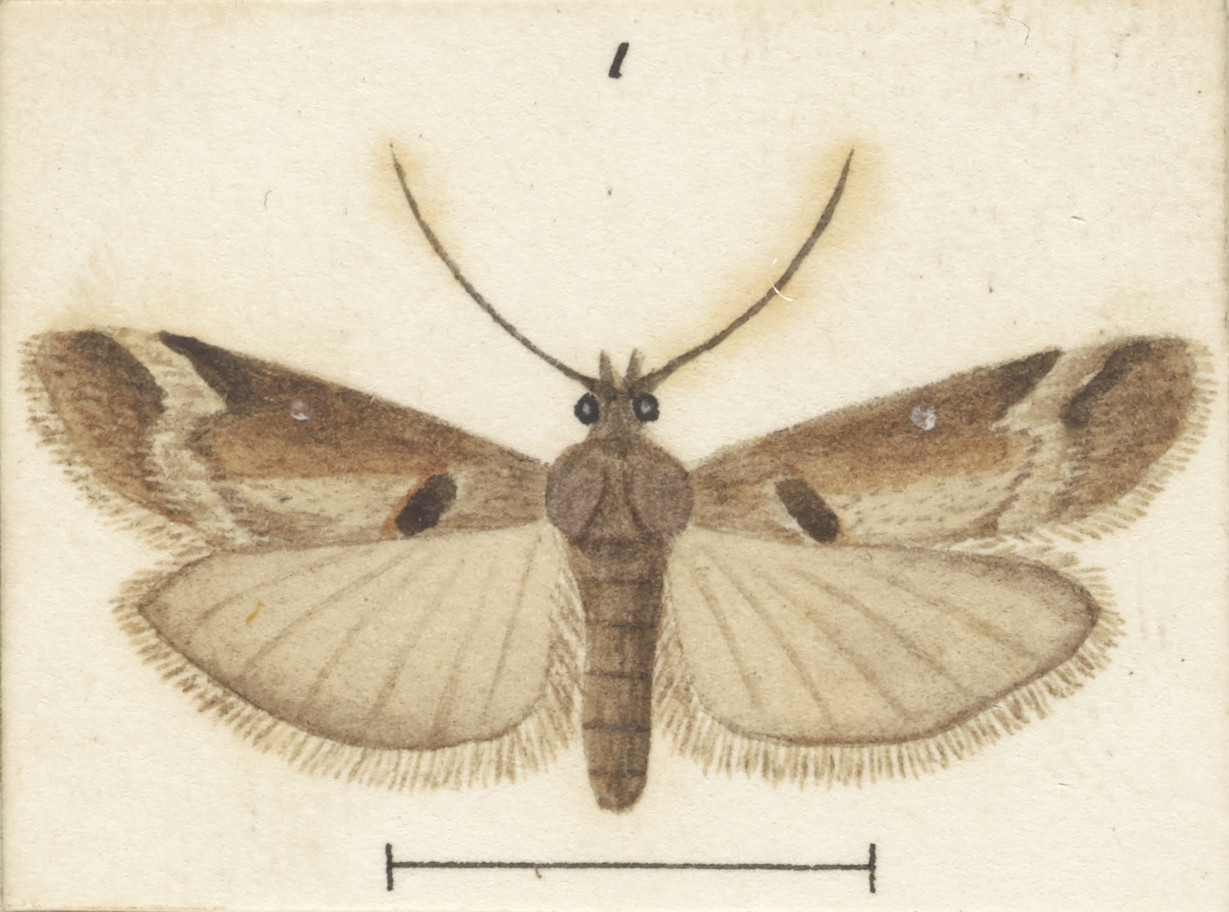
Illustration of male S. oenospora.

Meyrick described the species as follows:

17 mm. Head and thorax fuscous mixed with ferruginous. Labial palpi 1/2 light ferruginous, towards base whitish. Abdomen elongate. Forewings elongate, narrow, little dilated posteriorly, costa almost straight, termen somewhat rounded, very oblique; fuscous, irrorated with black and grey-whitish, and much suffused with ferruginous, especially in disc; first line straight, oblique, obscurely pale, edged posteriorly with a dark shade except towards dorsum, and preceded on dorsum by a spot of blackish suffusion; an obscure whitish discal dot, placed in a streak of ferruginous suffusion; second line cloudy, obscurely pale near termen, some-what indented near costa, edged anteriorly with a dark shade except towards dorsum; extreme costal edge white on posterior half. Hindwings dark fuscous.

== Distribution ==
Sporophyla oenospora is endemic to New Zealand. As well as occurring at Castle Hill, this species has also been collected at Ida Valley, Alexandra and Ben Lormond.

== Conservation status ==
This moth is now classified under the New Zealand Threat Classification system as being Nationally Critical.
