= Australephestiodes =

Scientific classification
- Kingdom: Animalia
- Phylum: Arthropoda
- Clade: Pancrustacea
- Class: Insecta
- Order: Lepidoptera
- Family: Pyralidae
- Subfamily: Phycitinae
- Genus: Australephestiodes; Neunzig, 1988
- Species: A. stictella

Binomial name
- Australephestiodes stictella (Hampson, 1901)

Synonyms
- Unadilla stictella Hampson, 1918; Ephestiodes stictella; Ephestiodes uniformella Hampson, 1901; Ephestiodes granulella Hampson, 1901

Genus of insects

Australephestiodes is a genus of moths belonging to the family Pyralidae. It contains only one species Australephestiodes stictella, which is found in Florida and on the Bahamas, Jamaica, Puerto Rico and the Virgin Islands.

The wingspan is 10–12 mm. The species is variable in color, ranging from very dark to whitish gray, the ground color (dark or light) being rather uniform over the forewing, the basal area no darker or lighter than the median and terminal areas. The antemedial band rather broad, whitish, oblique and nearly straight, outwardly bordered on costal half by a narrow blackish line. The subterminal line is narrow, parallel and near to the termen, slightly irregular, whitish bordered inwardly towards the costa by a thin, faint, blackish line. The discocellular spots more or less obsolescent, when distinct, separate and blackish. The hindwings are whitish to pale smoky fuscous, shaded with smoky fuscous towards the apex and termen.
