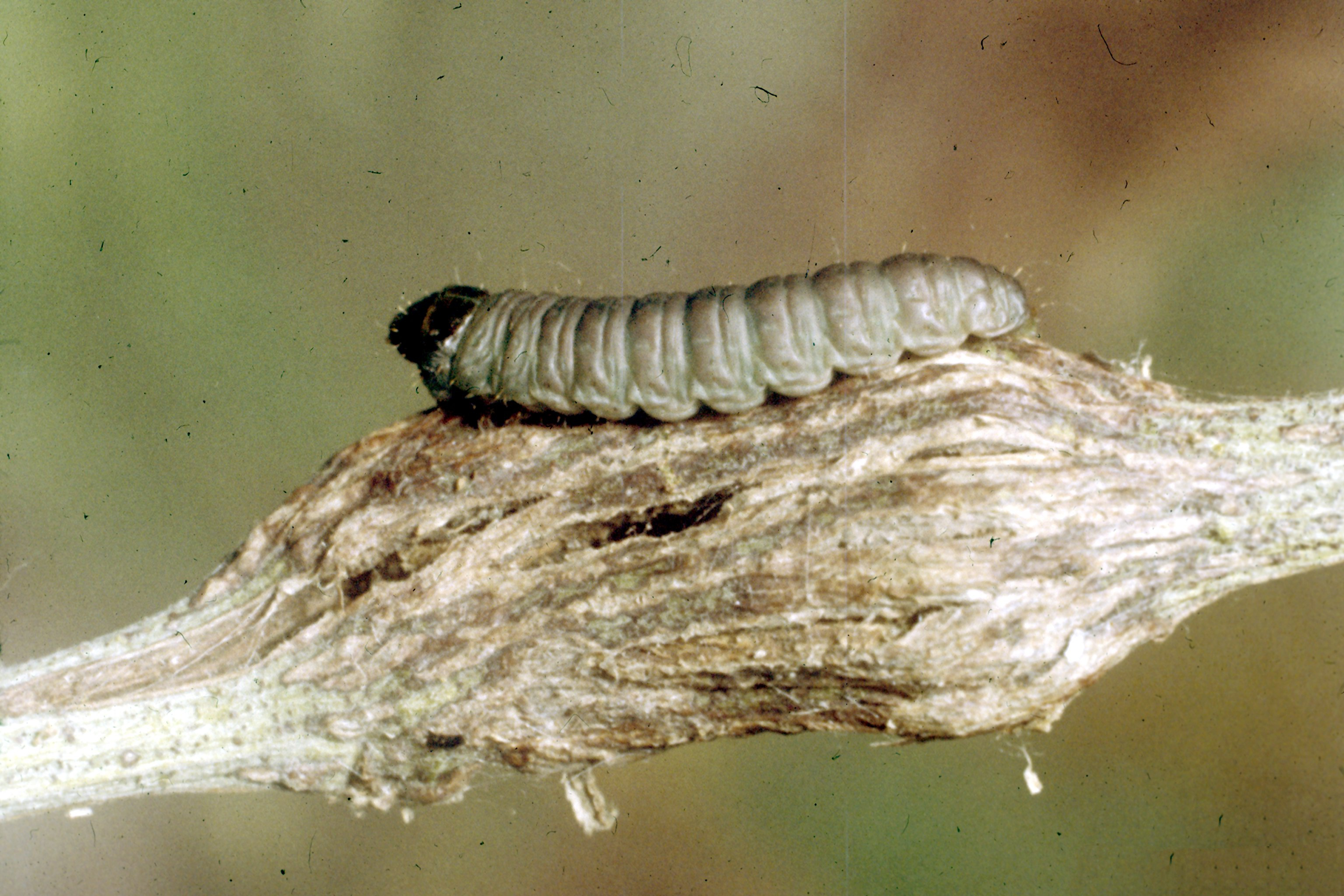

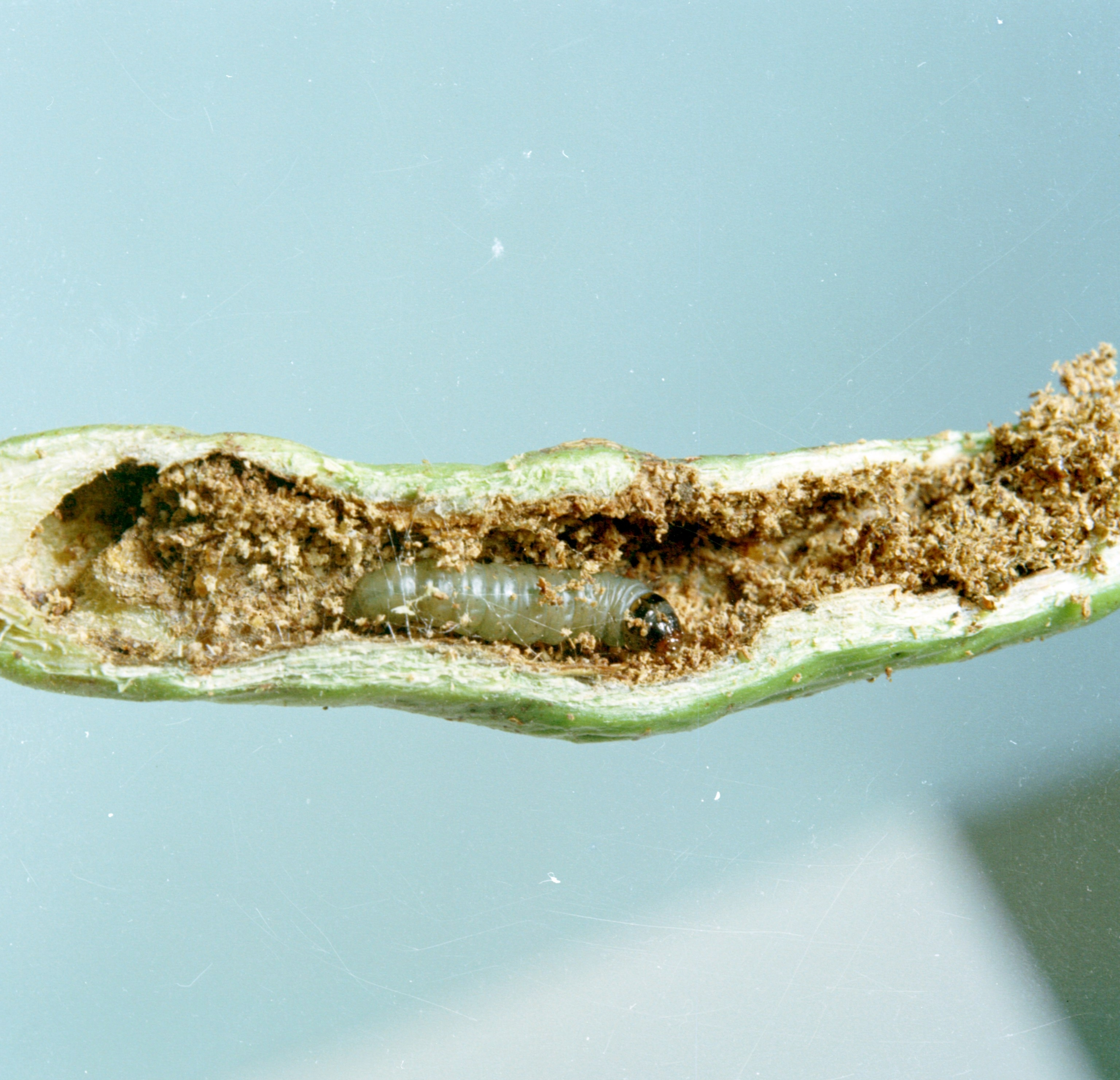

Scientific classification
- Domain: Eukaryota
- Kingdom: Animalia
- Phylum: Arthropoda
- Class: Insecta
- Order: Lepidoptera
- Family: Pyralidae
- Subfamily: Phycitinae
- Genus: Monoptilota; Hulst, 1900
- Species: M. pergratialis

Binomial name
- Monoptilota pergratialis (Hulst, 1886)

Synonyms
- Nephopteryx pergratialis Hulst, 1886; Monoptilota nubilella Hulst, 1900; Nephopteryx grotella Ragonot, 1887

= Monoptilota =

Genus of moths

Monoptilota is a genus of snout moths. It was described by George Duryea Hulst in 1900. It contains only one species, the lima-bean vine borer moth (Monoptilota pergratialis), which is found in the central and south-eastern parts of the United States.

The wingspan is 21–23 mm. There are three generations per year in North Carolina.

The larvae have been recorded on Phaseolus lunatus, snap bean, Vigna unguiculata and Dahlia species. Larvae can be found from May to October.
