= Oryctometopia fossulatella =

Scientific classification
- Domain: Eukaryota
- Kingdom: Animalia
- Phylum: Arthropoda
- Class: Insecta
- Order: Lepidoptera
- Family: Pyralidae
- Genus: Oryctometopia
- Species: O. fossulatella

Binomial name
- Oryctometopia fossulatella Ragonot, 1888

Synonyms
- Phycita moeschleri Ragonot, 1888

Species of moth

Oryctometopia fossulatella is a moth of the family Pyralidae. It was described by Émile Louis Ragonot in 1888, and is known from Costa Rica and Puerto Rico.
