= Pseudanabasis =

Scientific classification
- Kingdom: Animalia
- Phylum: Arthropoda
- Clade: Pancrustacea
- Class: Insecta
- Order: Lepidoptera
- Family: Pyralidae
- Subfamily: Phycitinae
- Genus: Pseudanabasis; Y.L. Du, S.M. Song & C.S. Wu, 2009
- Species: P. incanimaculata

Binomial name
- Pseudanabasis incanimaculata Y.L. Du, S.M. Song & C.S. Wu, 2009

Genus of moths

Pseudanabasis is a genus of snout moth. It was described by Y.L. Du, S.M. Song and C.S. Wu in 2009. The genus contains only one species, Pseudanabasis incanimaculata, which is found in China (Xizang).
