= Coenochroa californiella =

Scientific classification
- Domain: Eukaryota
- Kingdom: Animalia
- Phylum: Arthropoda
- Class: Insecta
- Order: Lepidoptera
- Family: Pyralidae
- Genus: Coenochroa
- Species: C. californiella

Binomial name
- Coenochroa californiella Ragonot, 1887

Synonyms
- Coenochroa inspergella Ragonot, 1887; Coenochroa monomacula Dyar, 1914; Metacrateria miasticta Hampson, 1918

Species of moth

Coenochroa californiella is a species of snout moth in the genus Coenochroa. It was described by Émile Louis Ragonot in 1887. It is found in North America from British Columbia to California, Kansas, Texas, Mexico and Panama in Central America.
