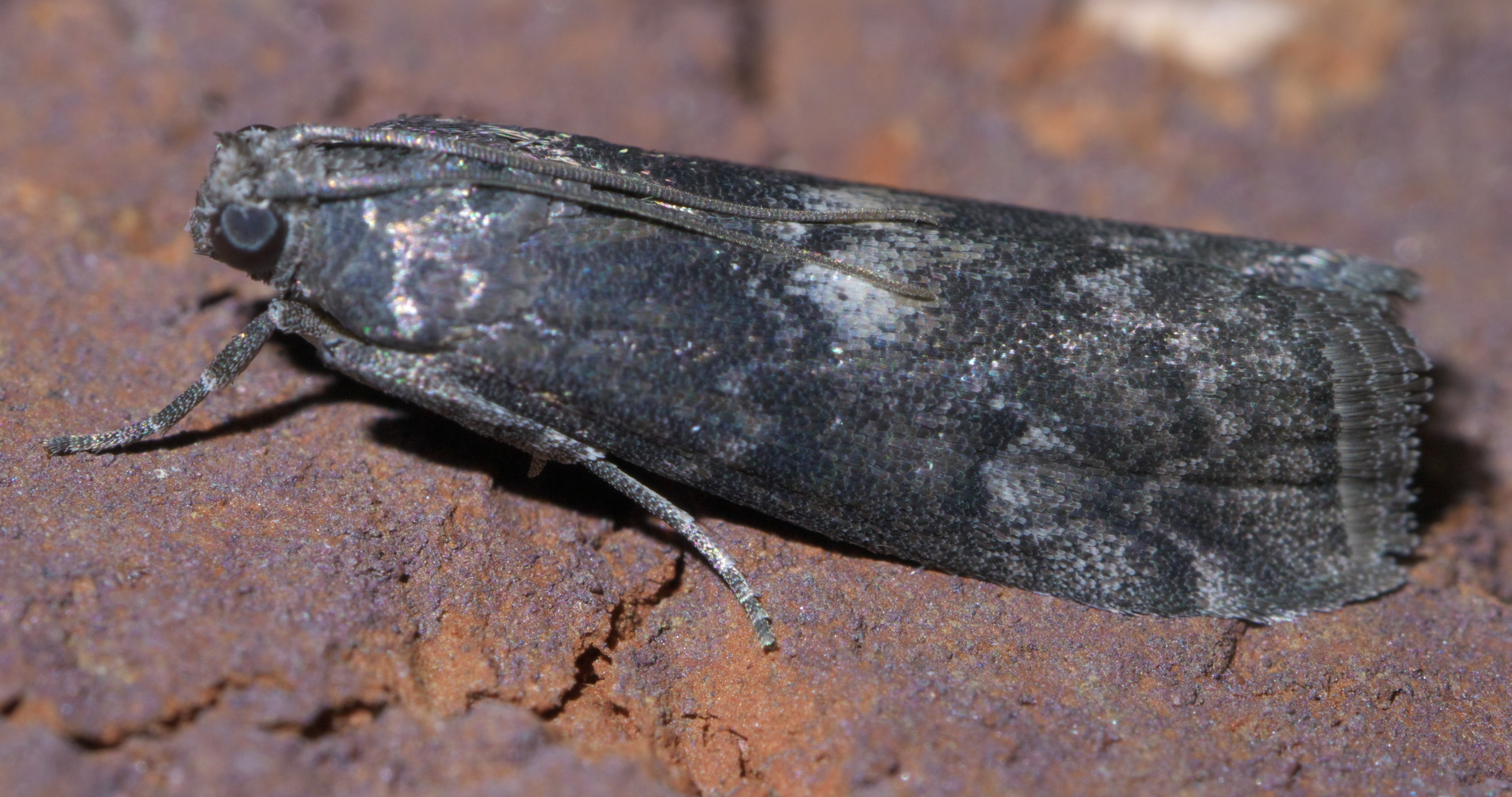

Scientific classification
- Kingdom: Animalia
- Phylum: Arthropoda
- Clade: Pancrustacea
- Class: Insecta
- Order: Lepidoptera
- Family: Pyralidae
- Genus: Salebriaria
- Species: S. engeli

Binomial name
- Salebriaria engeli (Dyar, 1906)

= Salebriaria engeli =

Species of moth

Salebriaria engeli, or Engel's salebriarium, is a species of pyralid moth in the family Pyralidae.

The MONA or Hodges number for Salebriaria engeli is 5773.

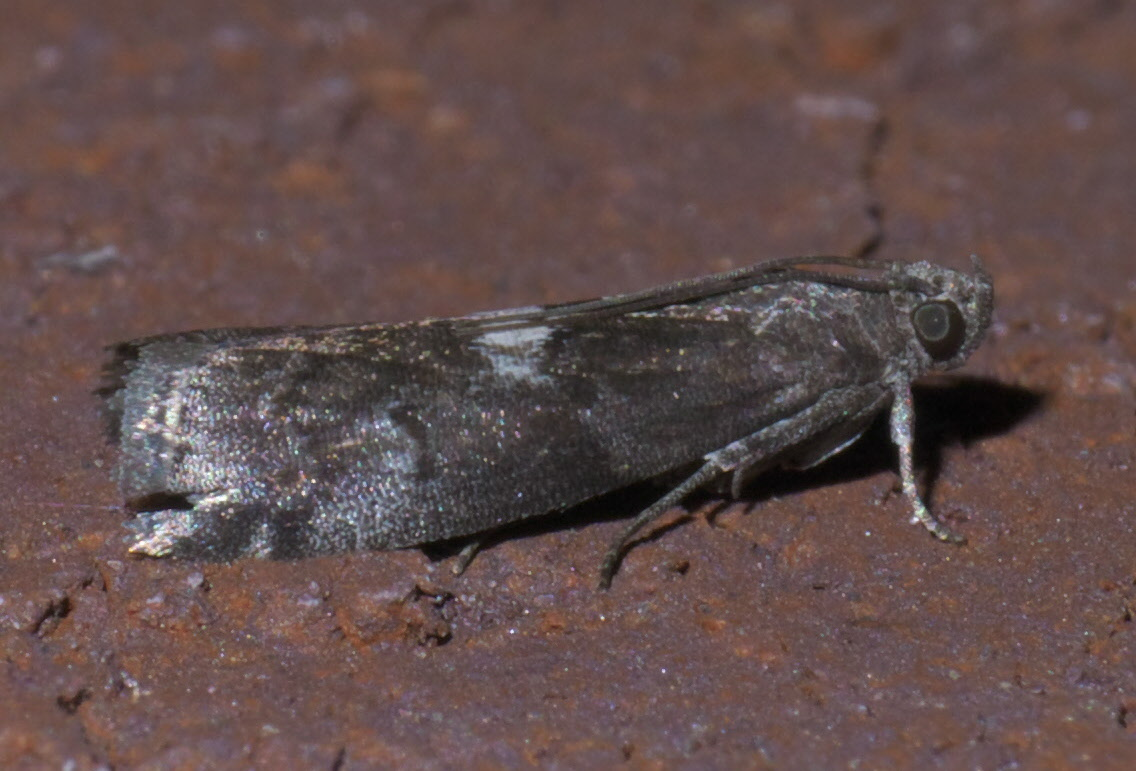
Engel's salebriaria, Salebriaria engeli
