= Coenochroa illibella =

Conservation status
- Unranked (NatureServe)

Scientific classification
- Domain: Eukaryota
- Kingdom: Animalia
- Phylum: Arthropoda
- Class: Insecta
- Order: Lepidoptera
- Family: Pyralidae
- Genus: Coenochroa
- Species: C. illibella

Binomial name
- Coenochroa illibella (Hulst, 1887)

Synonyms
- Anerastia illibella Hulst, 1887; Coenochroa puricostella Ragonot, 1887; Alamosa piperatella Hampson in Ragonot & Hampson, 1901

Species of moth

Coenochroa illibella, the dune panic grass moth, is a species of snout moth. It was described by George Duryea Hulst in 1887. It is found in North America, including Texas, Arizona, Colorado, California, Wyoming, Indiana, Ontario, and Alberta.
