= Chorrera (moth) =

Scientific classification
- Domain: Eukaryota
- Kingdom: Animalia
- Phylum: Arthropoda
- Class: Insecta
- Order: Lepidoptera
- Family: Pyralidae
- Subfamily: Phycitinae
- Genus: Chorrera; Dyar, 1914

Genus of moths

Chorrera is a genus of snout moths. It was described by Harrison Gray Dyar Jr. in 1914.

== Species ==
- Chorrera extrincica (Dyar, 1919)
- Chorrera idiotes Dyar, 1914
- Chorrera postica (Zeller, 1881)
