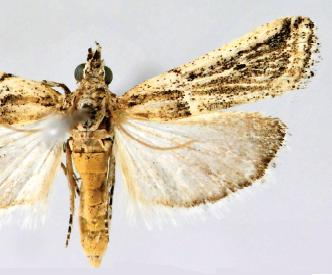
- Adult
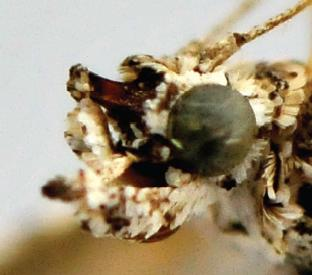
- Close-up of the head

Scientific classification
- Domain: Eukaryota
- Kingdom: Animalia
- Phylum: Arthropoda
- Class: Insecta
- Order: Lepidoptera
- Family: Pyralidae
- Genus: Prorophora
- Species: P. binacantha

Binomial name
- Prorophora binacantha Liu & Li, 2012

= Prorophora binacantha =

Species of moth

Prorophora binacantha is a species of snout moth. It is found in China (Inner Mongolia, Ningxia).

The wingspan is 16–19 mm. The ground color of the forewings is pale greyish brown, but dark brown along the veins between the antemedian and postmedian lines. The antemedian line is greyish white, obliquely straight, edged with a broad dark brown band along the inner side posteriorly, with a thin dark brown band along the outer side anteriorly. The postmedian line is greyish white, curved slightly inward at the middle, edged with a broad dark brown band along inner side and with a thin yellowish brown band along the outer side. The hindwings are greyish brown, but the outer margin is dark brown.

== Etymology ==
The specific name is derived from the Latin prefix bin- (meaning two, double) and acanthus (meaning spinous) and refers to the valva having an apical spine on the costa and a strong free apical spine on the ventral margin.
