= Prorophora afghanella =

Scientific classification
- Domain: Eukaryota
- Kingdom: Animalia
- Phylum: Arthropoda
- Class: Insecta
- Order: Lepidoptera
- Family: Pyralidae
- Genus: Prorophora
- Species: P. afghanella

Binomial name
- Prorophora afghanella Roesler, 1973

Species of moth

Prorophora afghanella is a species of snout moth. It is found in Pakistan.
