= Salinaria =

Scientific classification
- Kingdom: Animalia
- Phylum: Arthropoda
- Clade: Pancrustacea
- Class: Insecta
- Order: Lepidoptera
- Family: Pyralidae
- Subfamily: Phycitinae
- Genus: Salinaria; Rebel, 1901
- Species: S. diffusella

Binomial name
- Salinaria diffusella (Christoph, 1872)

Synonyms
- Genus: Salinaria Ragonot, 1901; Species: Myelois diffusella Christoph, 1872

Genus of moths

Salinaria is a genus of snout moths. It was described by Rebel in 1901, and contains the species Salinaria diffusella. It is found in Russia and Kazakhstan.
