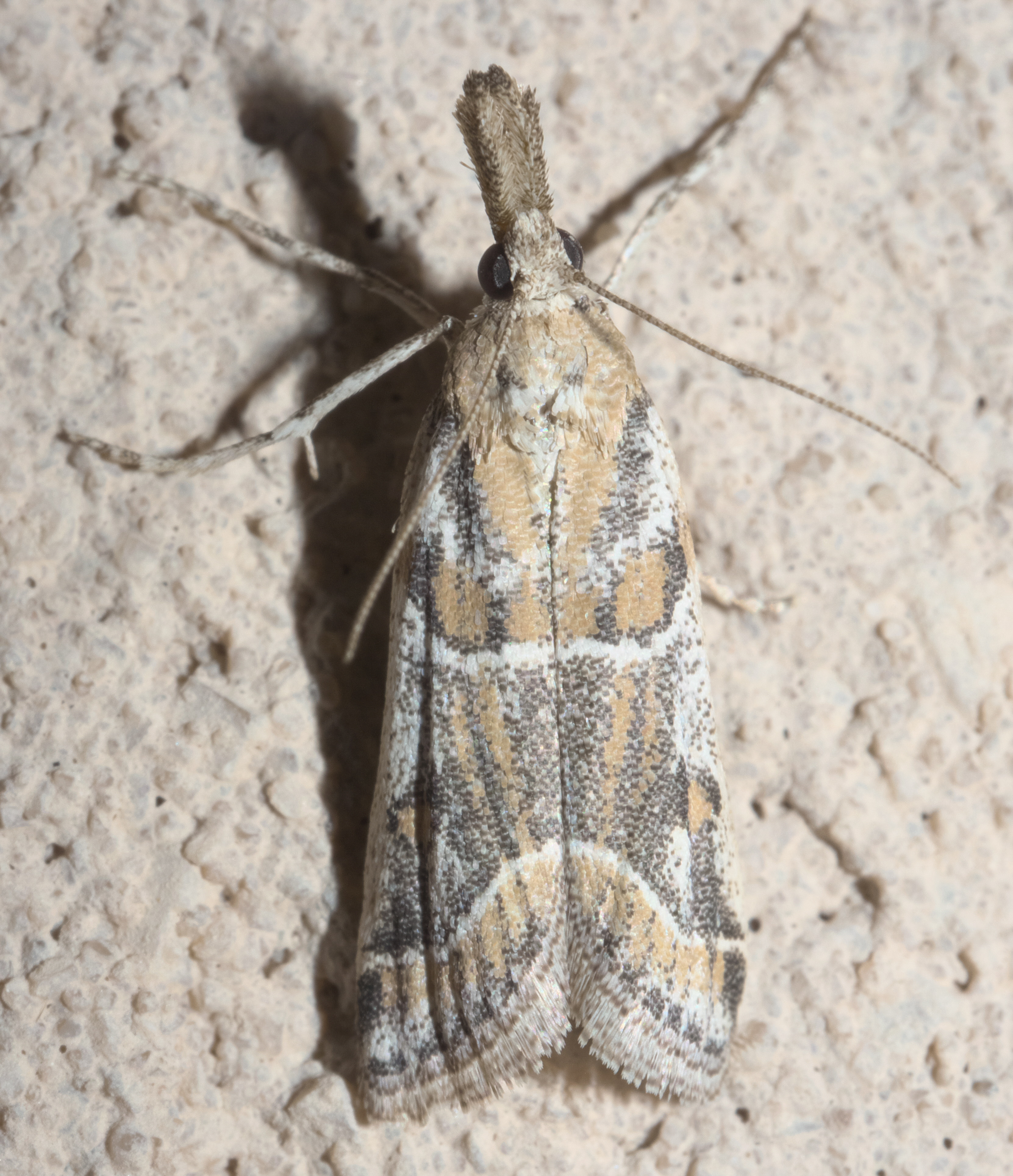

Scientific classification
- Kingdom: Animalia
- Phylum: Arthropoda
- Clade: Pancrustacea
- Class: Insecta
- Order: Lepidoptera
- Family: Pyralidae
- Subfamily: Phycitinae
- Genus: Martia; Ragonot, 1887
- Species: M. arizonella

Binomial name
- Martia arizonella Ragonot, 1887

Synonyms
- Genus: Urula Hulst, 1900; Species: Urula incongruella Hulst, 1900

= Martia arizonella =

Species of moth

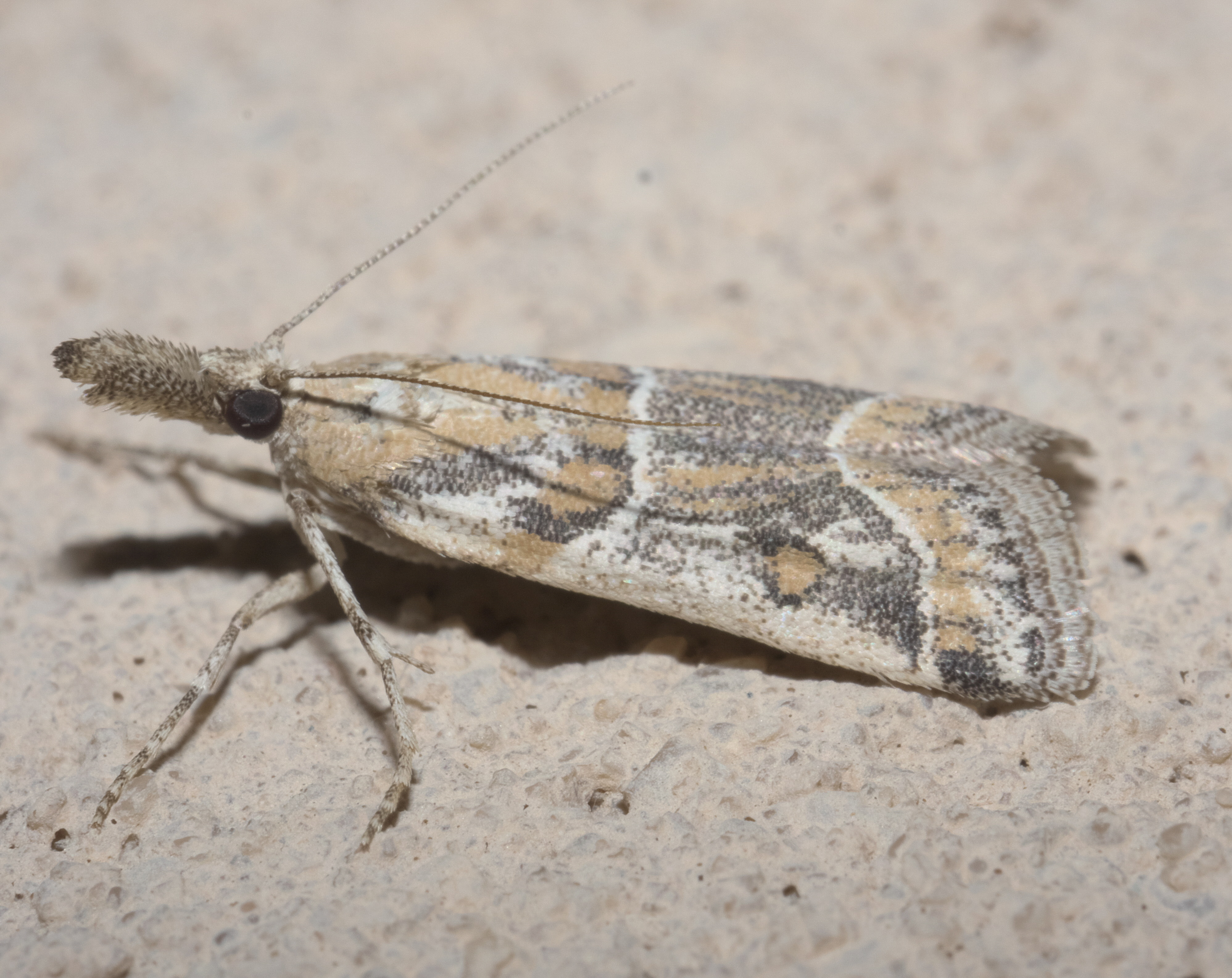
Martia arizonella, Size: 12.8 mm

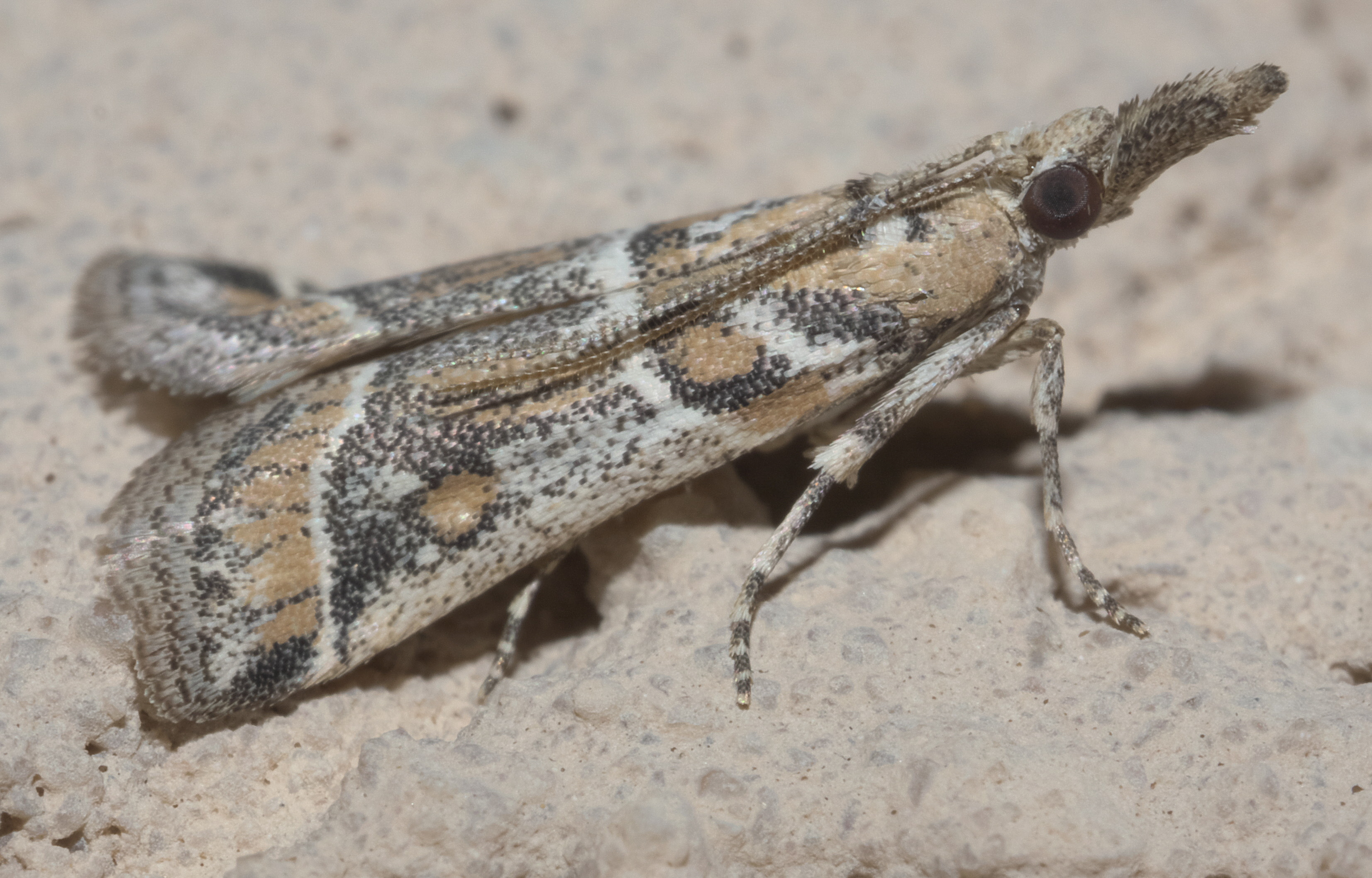
Martia arizonella, Size: 11.4 mm

Martia arizonella is a species of snout moth, and the only species in the genus Martia. Both were described by Émile Louis Ragonot in 1887. It is found in North America, including California, Arizona, Colorado and Utah.
