= Difundella =

Scientific classification
- Kingdom: Animalia
- Phylum: Arthropoda
- Class: Insecta
- Order: Lepidoptera
- Family: Pyralidae
- Subfamily: Phycitinae
- Genus: Difundella; Dyar, 1914
- Species: D. corynophora

Binomial name
- Difundella corynophora Dyar, 1914

Genus of moths

Difundella is a monotypic snout moth genus described by Harrison Gray Dyar Jr. in 1914. It contains the species Difundella corynophora, described by the same author, found in Panama.
