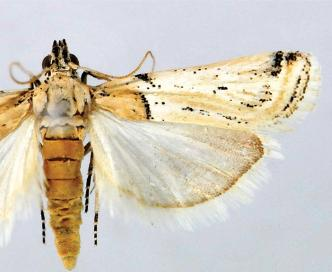

Scientific classification
- Kingdom: Animalia
- Phylum: Arthropoda
- Clade: Pancrustacea
- Class: Insecta
- Order: Lepidoptera
- Family: Pyralidae
- Genus: Prorophora
- Species: P. mongolica

Binomial name
- Prorophora mongolica Roesler, 1970

= Prorophora mongolica =

Species of moth

Prorophora mongolica is a species of snout moth. It is found in China (Inner Mongolia, Gansu) and Mongolia.

The wingspan is 15–18 mm. This species is characterized by a forewing with yellowish brown basal field edged with black on outer margin posteriorly, pale yellowish brown along the veins between the antemedian and postmedian lines.
