= Coenochroa =

Scientific classification
- Domain: Eukaryota
- Kingdom: Animalia
- Phylum: Arthropoda
- Class: Insecta
- Order: Lepidoptera
- Family: Pyralidae
- Subfamily: Phycitinae
- Genus: Coenochroa; Ragonot, 1887

Synonyms
- Alamosa Hampson in Ragonot & Hampson, 1901; Petaluma Hulst, 1888; Raphimetopus Hampson, 1918

Genus of moths

Coenochroa is a genus of snout moths, family Pyralidae. It was described by Émile Louis Ragonot in 1887. Species are known Eurasia, North Africa, and the Americas.

== Species ==
There are about ten recognized species:

- Coenochroa ablutella (Zeller, 1839)
- Coenochroa bimaculella (Ragonot, 1888)
- Coenochroa bipunctella (Barnes & McDunnough, 1913)
- Coenochroa californiella Ragonot, 1887
- Coenochroa chilensis Shaffer, 1992
- Coenochroa dentata Shaffer, 1989
- Coenochroa illibella (Hulst, 1887)
- Coenochroa prolixa Shaffer, 1989
- Coenochroa spinifrontella (Ragonot, 1888)
- Coenochroa stigmatella (Ragonot, 1888)
