= Nephopterygia =

Scientific classification
- Domain: Eukaryota
- Kingdom: Animalia
- Phylum: Arthropoda
- Class: Insecta
- Order: Lepidoptera
- Family: Pyralidae
- Subfamily: Phycitinae
- Genus: Nephopterygia; Amsel, 1965
- Species: N. austeritella

Binomial name
- Nephopterygia austeritella Amsel, 1965

Genus of moths

Nephopterygia is a monotypic snout moth genus described by Hans Georg Amsel in 1965. Its only species, N. austeritella, described by the same author, is found on the Canary Islands, as well as in Sudan and Egypt.
