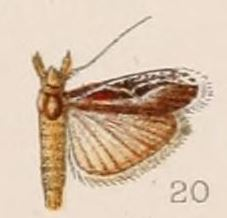

Scientific classification
- Kingdom: Animalia
- Phylum: Arthropoda
- Clade: Pancrustacea
- Class: Insecta
- Order: Lepidoptera
- Family: Pyralidae
- Subfamily: Phycitinae
- Genus: Pseudodavara; Roesler & Küppers, 1979
- Species: P. haemaphoralis

Binomial name
- Pseudodavara haemaphoralis (Hampson, 1908)

Synonyms
- Spatulipalpia haemaphoralis Hampson, 1908

= Pseudodavara =

Genus of moths

Pseudodavara haemaphoralis is a moth of the family Pyralidae first described by George Hampson in 1908. It is the only species in the genus Pseudodavara. It is found in India and Sri Lanka.
