= Prorophora eberti =

Scientific classification
- Domain: Eukaryota
- Kingdom: Animalia
- Phylum: Arthropoda
- Class: Insecta
- Order: Lepidoptera
- Family: Pyralidae
- Genus: Prorophora
- Species: P. eberti

Binomial name
- Prorophora eberti (Amsel, 1959)

Synonyms
- Aproceratia eberti Amsel, 1959

Species of moth

Prorophora eberti is a species of snout moth. It is found in Afghanistan.
