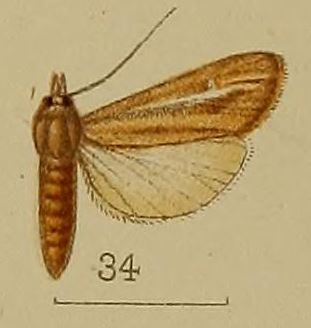

Scientific classification
- Kingdom: Animalia
- Phylum: Arthropoda
- Class: Insecta
- Order: Lepidoptera
- Family: Pyralidae
- Genus: Prorophora
- Species: P. dialeuca

Binomial name
- Prorophora dialeuca Hampson, 1912

= Prorophora dialeuca =

Species of moth

Prorophora dialeuca is a species of snout moth described by George Hampson in 1912. It is found in Sri Lanka and India.
