= Prorophora sacculicornella =

Scientific classification
- Domain: Eukaryota
- Kingdom: Animalia
- Phylum: Arthropoda
- Class: Insecta
- Order: Lepidoptera
- Family: Pyralidae
- Genus: Prorophora
- Species: P. sacculicornella

Binomial name
- Prorophora sacculicornella Roesler, 1970

Species of moth

Prorophora sacculicornella is a species of snout moth. It is found in Mongolia.
