= Chorrera postica =

Scientific classification
- Kingdom: Animalia
- Phylum: Arthropoda
- Clade: Pancrustacea
- Class: Insecta
- Order: Lepidoptera
- Family: Pyralidae
- Genus: Chorrera
- Species: C. postica

Binomial name
- Chorrera postica (Zeller, 1881)

Synonyms
- Myelois postica Zeller, 1881

Species of moth

Chorrera postica is a species of snout moth in the genus Chorrera. It was described by Philipp Christoph Zeller in 1881 and is found in Colombia.
