= Prorophora curvibasella =

Scientific classification
- Domain: Eukaryota
- Kingdom: Animalia
- Phylum: Arthropoda
- Class: Insecta
- Order: Lepidoptera
- Family: Pyralidae
- Genus: Prorophora
- Species: P. curvibasella

Binomial name
- Prorophora curvibasella Ragonot, 1887

Species of moth

Prorophora curvibasella is a species of snout moth. It is found in Uzbekistan.
