= Coenochroa chilensis =

Scientific classification
- Kingdom: Animalia
- Phylum: Arthropoda
- Class: Insecta
- Order: Lepidoptera
- Family: Pyralidae
- Genus: Coenochroa
- Species: C. chilensis

Binomial name
- Coenochroa chilensis Shaffer, 1992

Species of moth

Coenochroa chilensis is a species of snout moth, family Pyralidae. It was described by Jay C. Shaffer in 1992. It is known from Ñuble Province, Chile.

The forewing length is 8.5 mm (0.33 in) in males.
