= Zamagiria =

Scientific classification
- Kingdom: Animalia
- Phylum: Arthropoda
- Clade: Pancrustacea
- Class: Insecta
- Order: Lepidoptera
- Family: Pyralidae
- Subfamily: Phycitinae
- Genus: Zamagiria; Dyar, 1914

Type species
- Zamagiria dixolophella Dyar, 1914

Genus of moths

Zamagiria is a genus of small moths belonging to the snout moth family (Pyralidae). They are part of the huge snout moth subfamily Phycitinae, but their exact relationships are obscure, and they are currently not assigned to a particular tribe of Phycitinae.

This genus is almost exclusively found in the Neotropics. One species (Z. laidion) ranges north up to Florida, and one other (Z. exedra) was described from a specimen collected on Nuku Hiva in the Marquesas Islands. But the latter may simply have been accidentally introduced, being in reality a Neotropical species whose native range has not yet been discovered.

Zamagiria moths can usually be recognized in the field by their wing veins; the forewing has 11 veins (vein 7 is missing), and veins 4 and 5 almost connect at the base in the forewings, while on the hindwings veins 4 and 5 are connected along half of their entire length.

Species of Zamagiria include:

- Zamagiria australella (Hulst, 1900)
- Zamagiria dixolophella Dyar, 1914
- Zamagiria exedra Clarke, 1986
- Zamagiria kendalli Blanchard, 1970
- Zamagiria laidion (Zeller, 1881)
