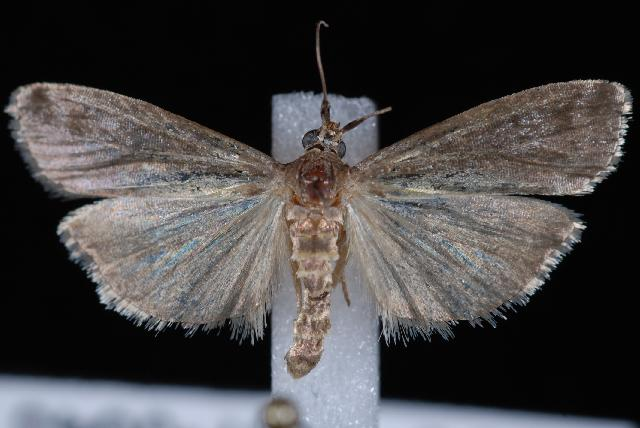
- Adult, mounted specimen

Scientific classification
- Kingdom: Animalia
- Phylum: Arthropoda
- Clade: Pancrustacea
- Class: Insecta
- Order: Lepidoptera
- Family: Pyralidae
- Subfamily: Phycitinae
- Genus: Oreana; Hulst, 1888
- Species: O. unicolorella

Binomial name
- Oreana unicolorella (Hulst, 1887)

Synonyms
- Dioryctria unicolorella Hulst, 1887; Myelois leucophaella Hulst, 1892

= Oreana unicolorella =

Species of moth

Oreana is a monotypic snout moth genus described by George Duryea Hulst in 1887. Its only species, Oreana unicolorella, described by Hulst one year earlier, is known from most of North America.

The larvae feed on maple, birch, hawthorn, apple, oak, willow, basswood and elm.
