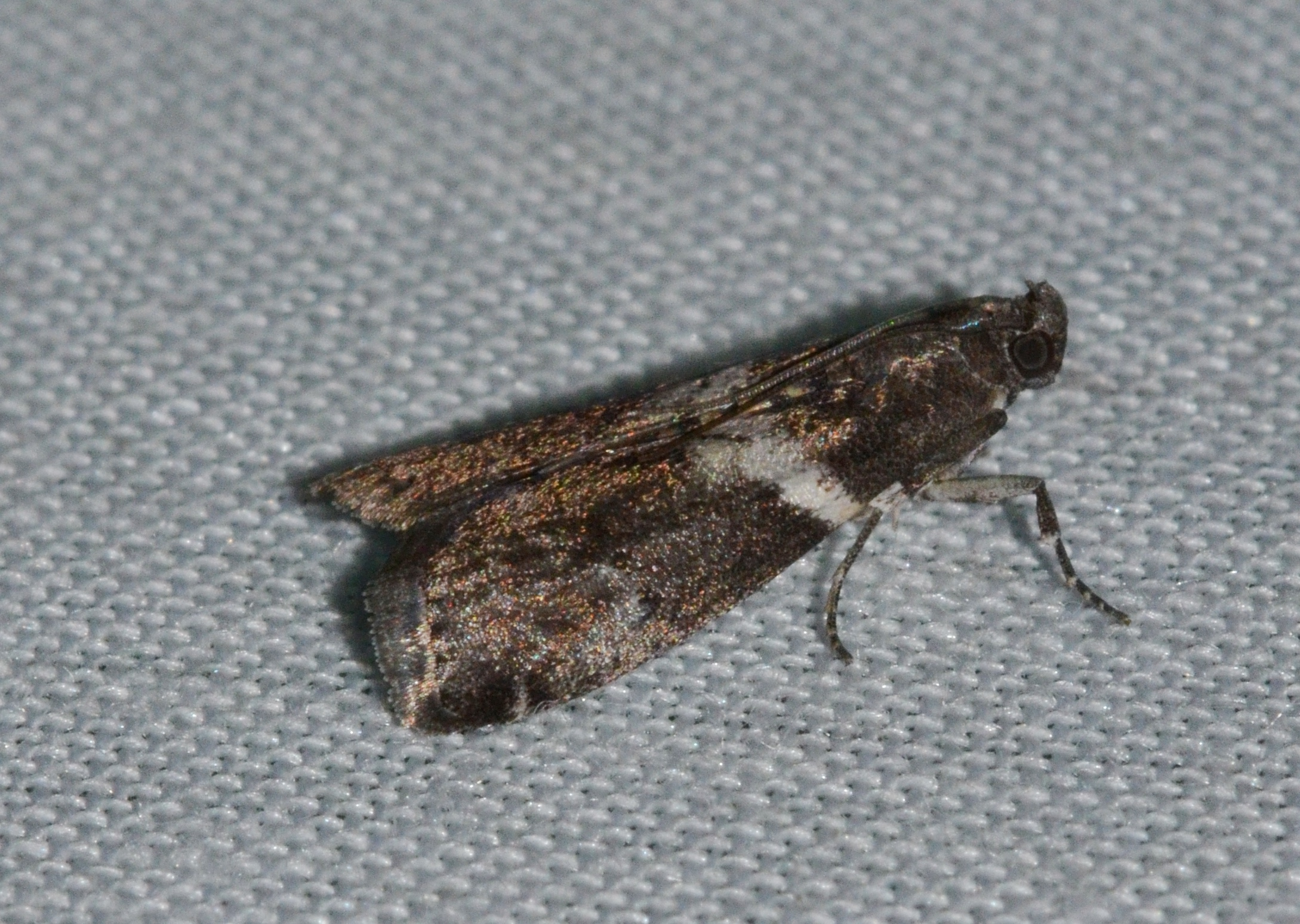

Scientific classification
- Domain: Eukaryota
- Kingdom: Animalia
- Phylum: Arthropoda
- Class: Insecta
- Order: Lepidoptera
- Family: Pyralidae
- Genus: Salebriaria
- Species: S. fasciata

Binomial name
- Salebriaria fasciata Neunzig, 1988

= Salebriaria fasciata =

Species of moth

Salebriaria fasciata is a species of snout moth. It is found in North America, where it has been recorded from Alabama, Florida, Kentucky, Maryland, Michigan, North Carolina, Oklahoma, South Carolina, Tennessee, Texas and West Virginia.

The wingspan is about 22 mm. Adults are on wing from April to August.
