= Berastagia =

Scientific classification
- Kingdom: Animalia
- Phylum: Arthropoda
- Class: Insecta
- Order: Lepidoptera
- Family: Pyralidae
- Subfamily: Phycitinae
- Genus: Berastagia; Roesler & Küppers, 1979
- Species: B. dissolutella

Binomial name
- Berastagia dissolutella (Snellen, 1880)

Synonyms
- Cryptoblabes dissolutella Snellen, 1880; Nephopteryx dissolutella

Genus of moths

Berastagia is a monotypic snout moth genus described by Rolf-Ulrich Roesler and Peter Victor Küppers in 1979. It contains the single species, Berastagia dissolutella, described by Pieter Cornelius Tobias Snellen in 1880. It is found in Australia.
