= Madiama nigroscitalis =

Scientific classification
- Kingdom: Animalia
- Phylum: Arthropoda
- Clade: Pancrustacea
- Class: Insecta
- Order: Lepidoptera
- Family: Pyralidae
- Subfamily: Phycitinae
- Genus: Madiama; Walker, 1864
- Species: M. nigroscitalis

Binomial name
- Madiama nigroscitalis Walker, 1864

Species of moth

Madiama nigroscitalis is a species of snout moth, and the only species in the genus Madiama. Both the genus and species were described by Francis Walker in 1864. It was described from Sierra Leone, but the type is lost.
