= Chorrera idiotes =

Scientific classification
- Domain: Eukaryota
- Kingdom: Animalia
- Phylum: Arthropoda
- Class: Insecta
- Order: Lepidoptera
- Family: Pyralidae
- Genus: Chorrera
- Species: C. idiotes

Binomial name
- Chorrera idiotes Dyar, 1914

Species of moth

Chorrera idiotes is a species of snout moth. It was described by Harrison Gray Dyar Jr. in 1914. It is found in Panama.

The wingspan is about 14 millimetres (0.55 in) for males and 17 mm (0.67 in) for females. The forewings are dark grey with a slightly luteous underground, irrorated with black. The hindwings are pure white and translucent.
