= Prorophora senganella =

Scientific classification
- Domain: Eukaryota
- Kingdom: Animalia
- Phylum: Arthropoda
- Class: Insecta
- Order: Lepidoptera
- Family: Pyralidae
- Genus: Prorophora
- Species: P. senganella

Binomial name
- Prorophora senganella (Amsel, 1951)

Synonyms
- Aproceratia senganella Amsel, 1951; Aproceratia richteri Amsel, 1959

Species of moth

Prorophora senganella is a species of snout moth. It is found in Iran.
