= Balinskyia =

Scientific classification
- Kingdom: Animalia
- Phylum: Arthropoda
- Class: Insecta
- Order: Lepidoptera
- Family: Pyralidae
- Subfamily: Phycitinae
- Genus: Balinskyia; Leraut G., 2019

Genus of moths

Balinskyia is a genus of Pyralidae moths in the subfamily Phycitinae. The species of this genus are only known from Africa.

== Species ==
- Balinskyia apidis Leraut G., 2019
- Balinskyia stomataula (Meyrick, 1933)
