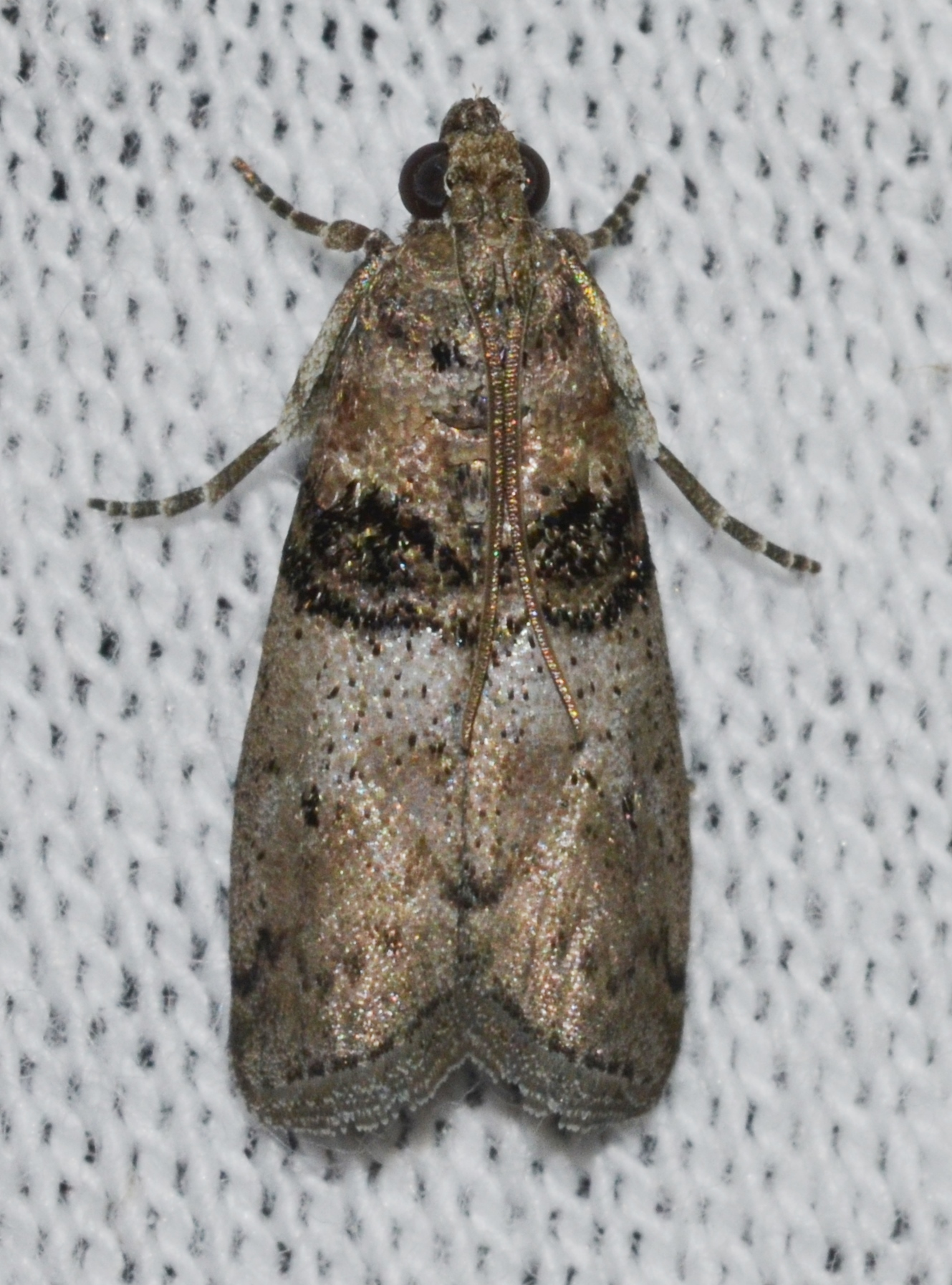

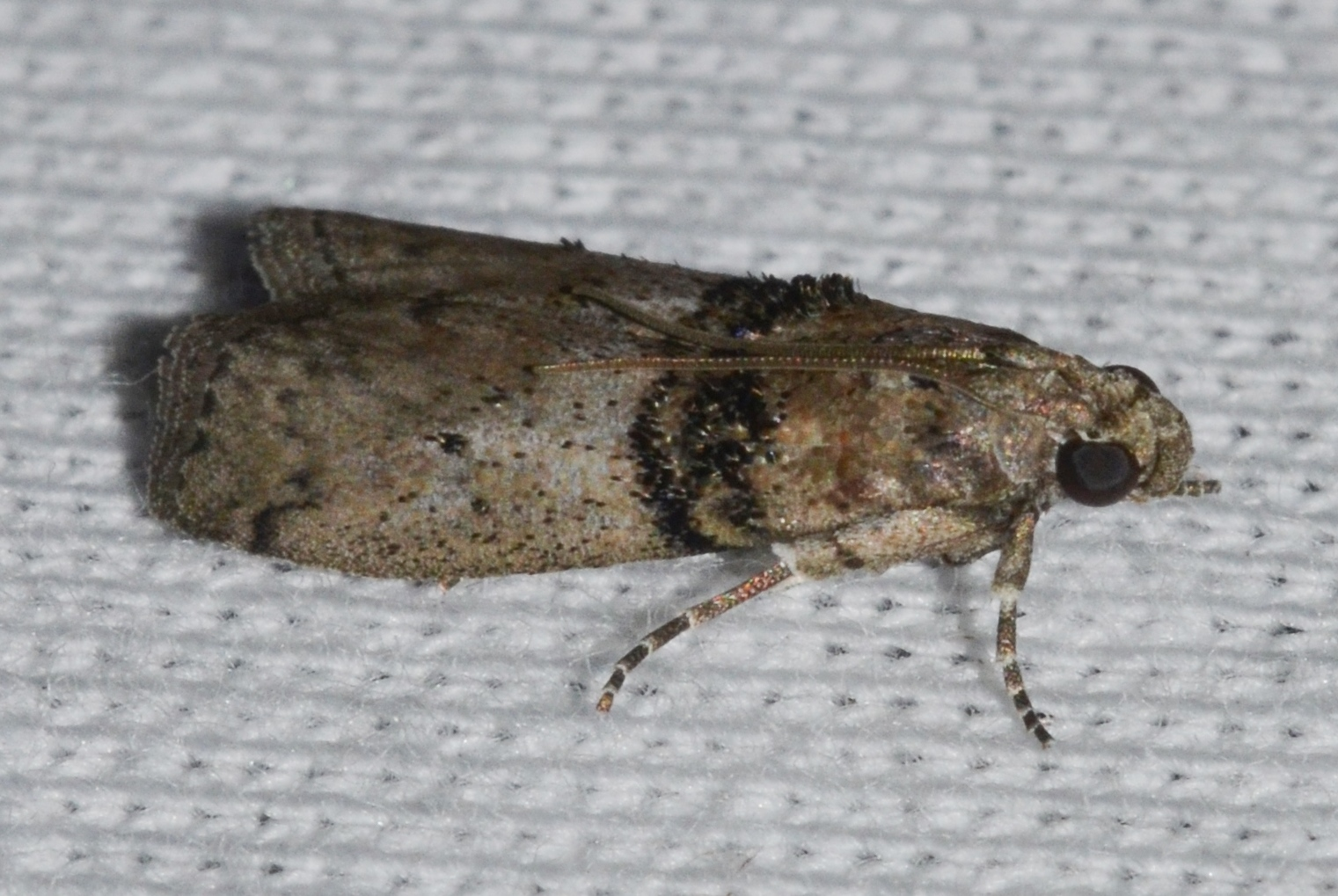

Scientific classification
- Domain: Eukaryota
- Kingdom: Animalia
- Phylum: Arthropoda
- Class: Insecta
- Order: Lepidoptera
- Family: Pyralidae
- Subfamily: Phycitinae
- Genus: Tlascala; Hulst, 1890
- Species: T. reductella

Binomial name
- Tlascala reductella (Walker, 1863)

Synonyms
- Nephopterix reductella Walker, 1863; Pempelia gleditschiella Fernald, 1881

= Tlascala =

Genus of moths

Tlascala is a monotypic snout moth genus described by George Duryea Hulst in 1890. Its only species is Tlascala reductella, the Tlascala moth, described by Francis Walker in 1863. It is found in North America, where it has been recorded from Florida to Illinois and Kentucky, as well as in Ontario. It has also been recorded from Honduras.

The wingspan is about 20 mm (0.79 in). Adults have been recorded on wing from February to September, with most records from April to July.
