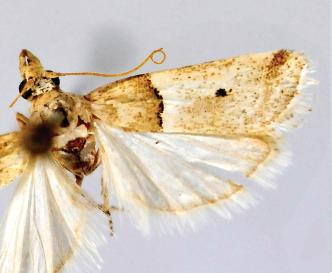

Scientific classification
- Domain: Eukaryota
- Kingdom: Animalia
- Phylum: Arthropoda
- Class: Insecta
- Order: Lepidoptera
- Family: Pyralidae
- Genus: Prorophora
- Species: P. albidogilvella

Binomial name
- Prorophora albidogilvella Roesler, 1970

= Prorophora albidogilvella =

Species of moth

Prorophora albidogilvella is a species of snout moth. It is found in China (Inner Mongolia Autonomous Region, Gansu) and Mongolia.

The wingspan is 15–18 mm.
