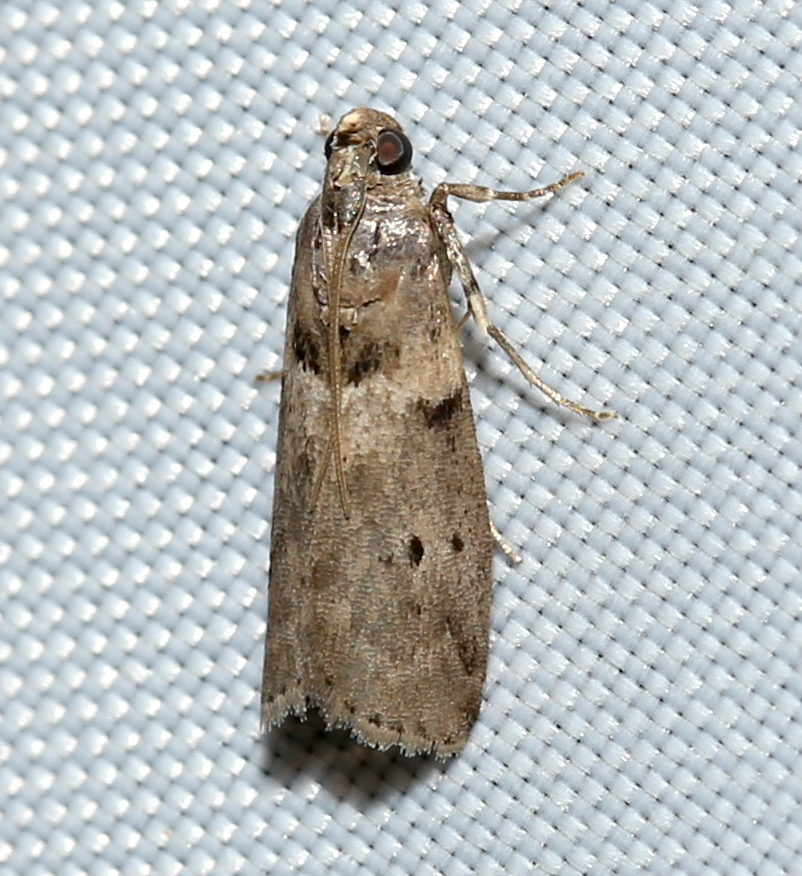

Scientific classification
- Kingdom: Animalia
- Phylum: Arthropoda
- Class: Insecta
- Order: Lepidoptera
- Family: Pyralidae
- Genus: Salebriaria
- Species: S. annulosella

Binomial name
- Salebriaria annulosella (Ragonot, 1887)

Synonyms
- Nephopteryx annulosella Ragonot, 1887

= Salebriaria annulosella =

Species of moth

Salebriaria annulosella is a species of snout moth. It is found in North America, where it has been recorded from Florida, Georgia, Illinois, Indiana, Maine, Mississippi, North Carolina, Oklahoma, South Carolina and Texas.
