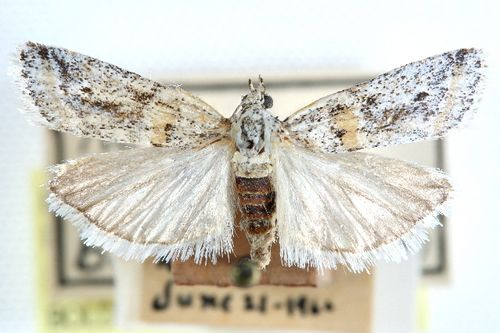

Scientific classification
- Kingdom: Animalia
- Phylum: Arthropoda
- Clade: Pancrustacea
- Class: Insecta
- Order: Lepidoptera
- Family: Pyralidae
- Genus: Acroncosa
- Species: A. similella

Binomial name
- Acroncosa similella Barnes & McDunnough, 1917

= Acroncosa similella =

Species of moth

Acroncosa similella is a species of snout moth in the genus Acroncosa. It was described by William Barnes and James Halliday McDunnough in 1917. It is found in the US state of California.
