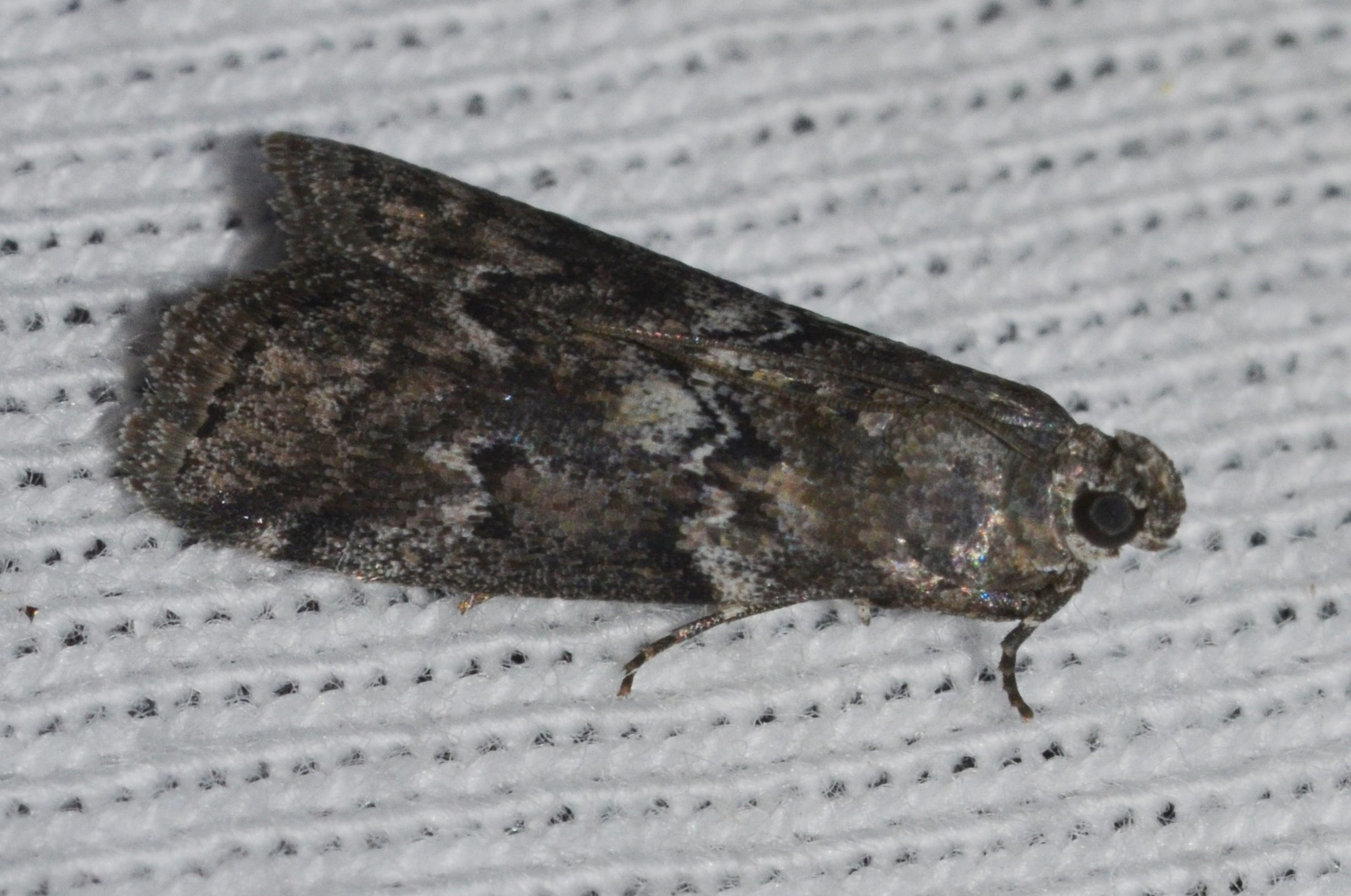

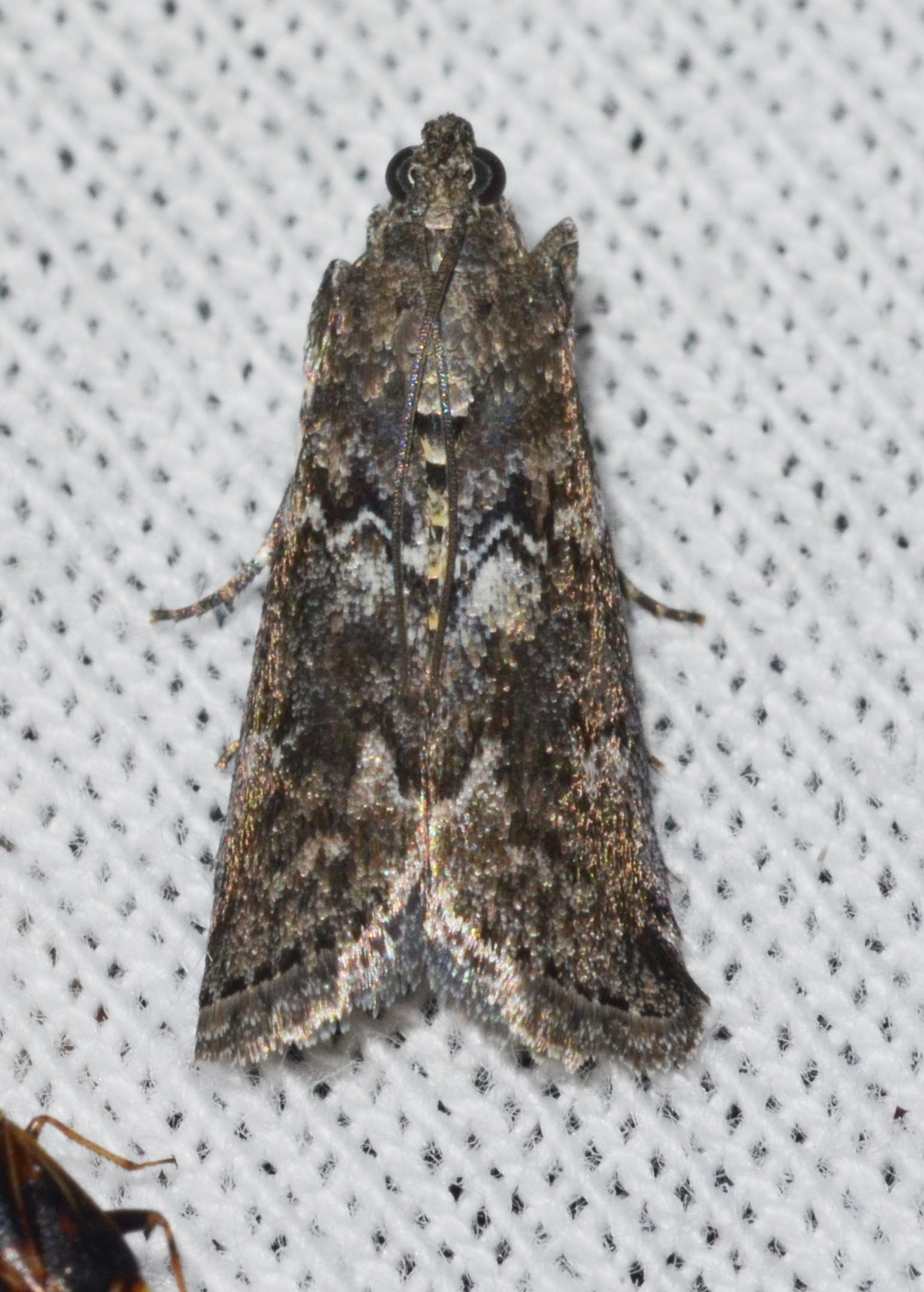

Scientific classification
- Domain: Eukaryota
- Kingdom: Animalia
- Phylum: Arthropoda
- Class: Insecta
- Order: Lepidoptera
- Family: Pyralidae
- Genus: Salebriaria
- Species: S. turpidella

Binomial name
- Salebriaria turpidella (Ragonot, 1888)

Synonyms
- Salebria turpidella Ragonot, 1888

= Salebriaria turpidella =

Species of moth

Salebriaria turpidella is a species of snout moth. It is found in North America, where it has been recorded from Alabama, Florida, Georgia, Illinois, Indiana, Maine, Mississippi, Oklahoma, South Carolina, Tennessee and West Virginia.
