= Coenochroa prolixa =

Scientific classification
- Domain: Eukaryota
- Kingdom: Animalia
- Phylum: Arthropoda
- Class: Insecta
- Order: Lepidoptera
- Family: Pyralidae
- Genus: Coenochroa
- Species: C. prolixa

Binomial name
- Coenochroa prolixa Shaffer, 1989

Species of moth

Coenochroa prolixa is a species of snout moth in the genus Coenochroa. It was described by Jay C. Shaffer in 1989. It is found in Brazil.
