= Caviana (moth) =

Scientific classification
- Domain: Eukaryota
- Kingdom: Animalia
- Phylum: Arthropoda
- Class: Insecta
- Order: Lepidoptera
- Family: Pyralidae
- Subfamily: Phycitinae
- Genus: Caviana; Neunzig & Dow, 1993
- Species: C. fuscella

Binomial name
- Caviana fuscella Neunzig & Dow, 1993

Genus of moths

Caviana is a monotypic snout moth genus described by Herbert H. Neunzig and L. C. Dow in 1993. Its only species, Caviana fuscella, described in the same publication, is found in Belize.
