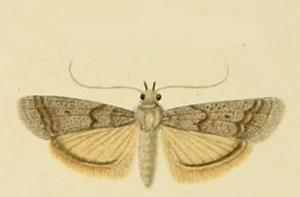

Scientific classification
- Kingdom: Animalia
- Phylum: Arthropoda
- Clade: Pancrustacea
- Class: Insecta
- Order: Lepidoptera
- Family: Pyralidae
- Subfamily: Phycitinae
- Genus: Pararotruda; Roesler, 1965
- Species: P. nesiotica

Binomial name
- Pararotruda nesiotica (Rebel, 1911)

Synonyms
- Homoeosoma nesiotica Rebel, 1911

= Pararotruda =

Genus of moths

Pararotruda is a genus of snout moths. It was described by Roesler in 1965, and contains the species Pararotruda nesiotica. It is found on the Canary Islands and Madeira.

The wingspan is 16–18 mm.
