= Prorophora grisealella =

Scientific classification
- Domain: Eukaryota
- Kingdom: Animalia
- Phylum: Arthropoda
- Class: Insecta
- Order: Lepidoptera
- Family: Pyralidae
- Genus: Prorophora
- Species: P. grisealella

Binomial name
- Prorophora grisealella Marion, 1957

Species of moth

Prorophora grisealella is a species of snout moth. It is found in Senegal.
