= Homoeographa mexicana =

Scientific classification
- Kingdom: Animalia
- Phylum: Arthropoda
- Clade: Pancrustacea
- Class: Insecta
- Order: Lepidoptera
- Family: Pyralidae
- Genus: Homoeographa
- Species: H. mexicana

Binomial name
- Homoeographa mexicana Neunzig, 1994

Species of moth

Homoeographa mexicana is a species of snout moth described by Herbert H. Neunzig in 1994. It is found along the west-central coast of Mexico.
