= Irakia =

Scientific classification
- Domain: Eukaryota
- Kingdom: Animalia
- Phylum: Arthropoda
- Class: Insecta
- Order: Lepidoptera
- Family: Pyralidae
- Subfamily: Phycitinae
- Genus: Irakia; Amsel, 1955
- Species: I. simplicialis

Binomial name
- Irakia simplicialis (Rothschild, 1921)

Synonyms
- Dattinia simplicialis Rothschild, 1921; Irakia pallens Amsel, 1955

Genus of moths

Irakia is a monotypic snout moth genus described by Hans Georg Amsel in 1955. Its only species, Irakia simplicialis, described by Walter Rothschild in 1921, is found in Iraq.
