= Oryctometopia venezuelensis =

Scientific classification
- Domain: Eukaryota
- Kingdom: Animalia
- Phylum: Arthropoda
- Class: Insecta
- Order: Lepidoptera
- Family: Pyralidae
- Genus: Oryctometopia
- Species: O. venezuelensis

Binomial name
- Oryctometopia venezuelensis Amsel, 1956

Species of moth

Oryctometopia venezuelensis is a moth of the family Pyralidae. It was described by Hans Georg Amsel in 1956 and is found in Venezuela.
