= Homoeographa lanceolella =

Scientific classification
- Domain: Eukaryota
- Kingdom: Animalia
- Phylum: Arthropoda
- Class: Insecta
- Order: Lepidoptera
- Family: Pyralidae
- Genus: Homoeographa
- Species: H. lanceolella

Binomial name
- Homoeographa lanceolella Ragonot, 1888

Species of moth

Homoeographa lanceolella is a species of snout moth. It was described by Émile Louis Ragonot in 1888 and is found in Peru.
