= Gunungia =

Scientific classification
- Domain: Eukaryota
- Kingdom: Animalia
- Phylum: Arthropoda
- Class: Insecta
- Order: Lepidoptera
- Family: Pyralidae
- Subfamily: Phycitinae
- Genus: Gunungia; Roesler & Küppers, 1979

Genus of moths

Gunungia is a genus of snout moths. It was described by Rolf-Ulrich Roesler and Peter Victor Küppers in 1979.

== Species ==
- Gunungia capitirecava Ren & Li, 2007
- Gunungia rimba Roesler & Küppers, 1979
