= Euageta =

Scientific classification
- Domain: Eukaryota
- Kingdom: Animalia
- Phylum: Arthropoda
- Class: Insecta
- Order: Lepidoptera
- Family: Pyralidae
- Subfamily: Phycitinae
- Genus: Euageta; Turner, 1947
- Species: E. dianipha

Binomial name
- Euageta dianipha (Lower, 1902)

Synonyms
- Crambus dianipha Lower, 1902; Culladia albimedialis Hampson, 1919; Euageta arestodes Turner, 1947

Genus of moths

Euageta is a monotypic snout moth genus described by Alfred Jefferis Turner in 1947. Its one species, Euageta dianipha, described by Oswald Bertram Lower in 1902, is known from Australia.
