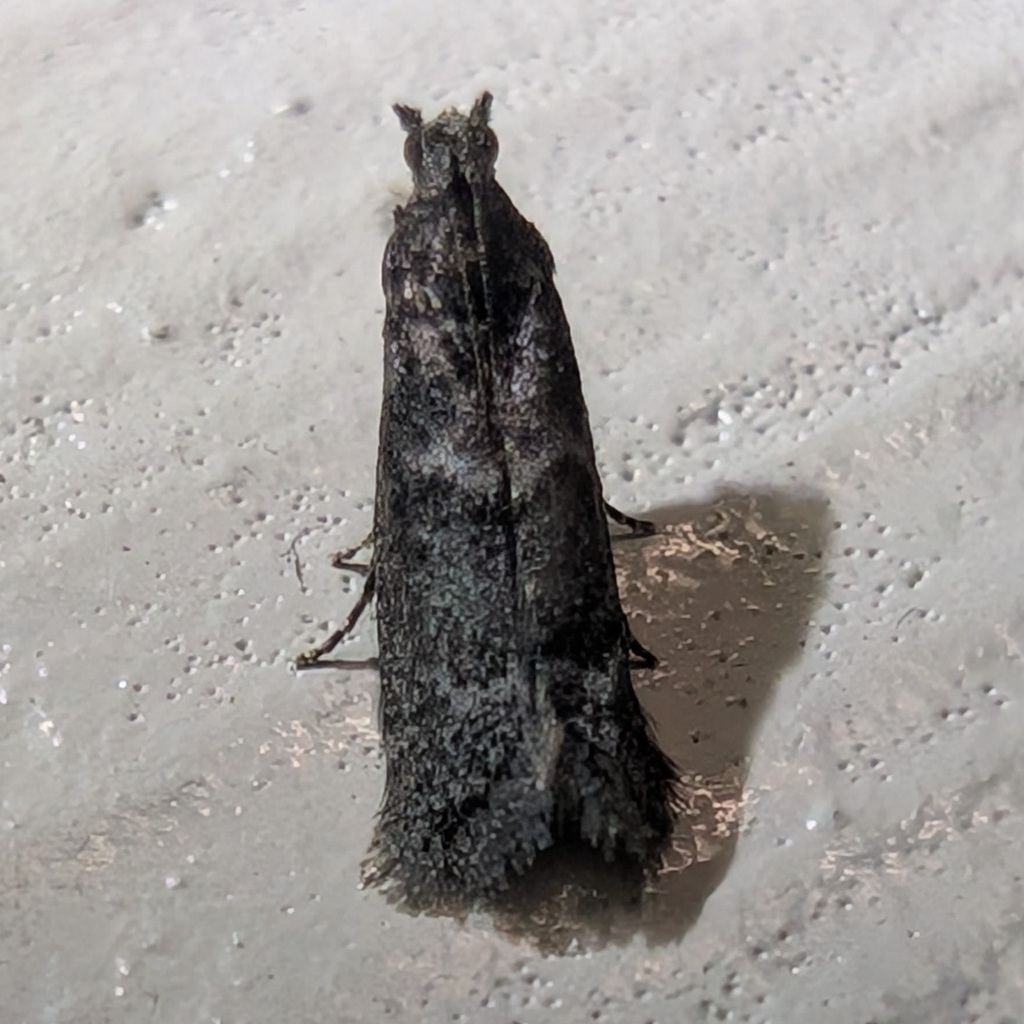

Scientific classification
- Kingdom: Animalia
- Phylum: Arthropoda
- Clade: Pancrustacea
- Class: Insecta
- Order: Lepidoptera
- Family: Pyralidae
- Subfamily: Phycitinae
- Genus: Cabnia; Dyar, 1904
- Species: C. myronella

Binomial name
- Cabnia myronella Dyar, 1904

= Cabnia =

Genus of moths

Cabnia is a monotypic snout moth genus described by Harrison Gray Dyar Jr. in 1904. Its only member, C. myronella, is found in the United States from Massachusetts to Florida and Mississippi.
