= Cryptadia =

Scientific classification
- Kingdom: Animalia
- Phylum: Arthropoda
- Class: Insecta
- Order: Lepidoptera
- Family: Pyralidae
- Subfamily: Phycitinae
- Genus: Cryptadia; Turner, 1913
- Species: C. xuthobela

Binomial name
- Cryptadia xuthobela Turner, 1913

Synonyms
- Euzopherodes homophaea Turner, 1947; Tylochares paucinotata Turner, 1947

Genus of moths

Cryptadia is a monotypic snout moth genus described by Alfred Jefferis Turner in 1913. Its single species, described in the same publication, Cryptadia xuthobela, is known from Australia.
