= Heras (moth) =

Scientific classification
- Domain: Eukaryota
- Kingdom: Animalia
- Phylum: Arthropoda
- Class: Insecta
- Order: Lepidoptera
- Family: Pyralidae
- Subfamily: Phycitinae
- Genus: Heras; Heinrich, 1956
- Species: H. disjunctus

Binomial name
- Heras disjunctus Heinrich, 1956

Genus of moths

Heras is a monotypic snout moth genus described by Carl Heinrich in 1956. Its single species, Heras disjunctus, is found in Colombia.
