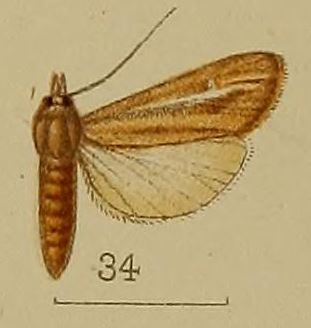
- Prorophora dialeuca

Scientific classification
- Domain: Eukaryota
- Kingdom: Animalia
- Phylum: Arthropoda
- Class: Insecta
- Order: Lepidoptera
- Family: Pyralidae
- Subfamily: Phycitinae
- Genus: Prorophora; Ragonot, 1887

Synonyms
- Aproceratia Amsel, 1950; Reisserempista Roesler, 1970

= Prorophora =

Genus of moths

Prorophora is a genus of snout moths described by Émile Louis Ragonot in 1887.

== Species ==
- Subgenus Prorophora
  - Prorophora albidogilvella Roesler, 1970
  - Prorophora curvibasella Ragonot, 1887
  - Prorophora dialeuca Hampson, 1912
  - Prorophora grisealella Marion, 1957
  - Prorophora kazachstaniella Asselbergs, 2004
  - Prorophora sacculicornella Roesler, 1970
- Subgenus Reisserempista Roesler, 1970
  - Prorophora binacantha Liu & Li, 2012
  - Prorophora mongolica Roesler, 1970
- Subgenus Aproceratia Amsel, 1950
  - Prorophora afghanella Roesler, 1973
  - Prorophora albunculella (Staudinger, 1879)
  - Prorophora eberti (Amsel, 1959)
  - Prorophora halothamni Falkovitsh, 1999
  - Prorophora senganella (Amsel, 1951)
