= Gunungia rimba =

Scientific classification
- Domain: Eukaryota
- Kingdom: Animalia
- Phylum: Arthropoda
- Class: Insecta
- Order: Lepidoptera
- Family: Pyralidae
- Genus: Gunungia
- Species: G. rimba

Binomial name
- Gunungia rimba Roesler & Küppers, 1979

Species of moth

Gunungia rimba is a species of snout moth in the genus Gunungia. It was described by Roesler and Küppers in 1979. It is found on Sumatra.
