= Prorophora halothamni =

Scientific classification
- Domain: Eukaryota
- Kingdom: Animalia
- Phylum: Arthropoda
- Class: Insecta
- Order: Lepidoptera
- Family: Pyralidae
- Genus: Prorophora
- Species: P. halothamni

Binomial name
- Prorophora halothamni Falkovitsh, 1999

Species of moth

Prorophora halothamni is a species of snout moth described by Mark I. Falkovitsh in 1999. It is found in Uzbekistan.
