= Acroncosa minima =

Scientific classification
- Kingdom: Animalia
- Phylum: Arthropoda
- Clade: Pancrustacea
- Class: Insecta
- Order: Lepidoptera
- Family: Pyralidae
- Genus: Acroncosa
- Species: A. minima

Binomial name
- Acroncosa minima Neunzig, 2003

Species of moth

Acroncosa minima is a species of snout moth in the genus Acroncosa. It was described by Herbert H. Neunzig in 2003 and is endemic to the US state of California.
