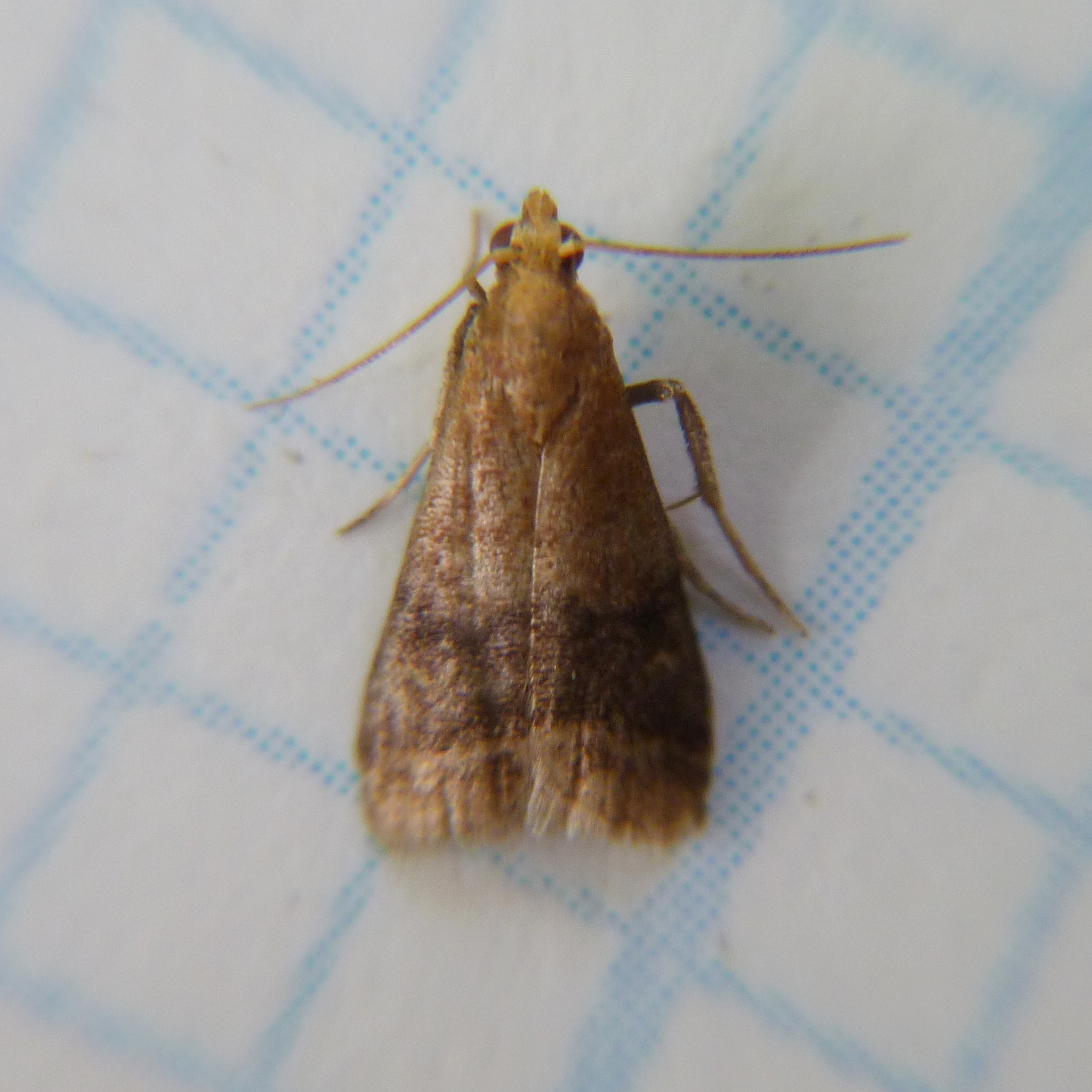

Scientific classification
- Kingdom: Animalia
- Phylum: Arthropoda
- Clade: Pancrustacea
- Class: Insecta
- Order: Lepidoptera
- Family: Pyralidae
- Subfamily: Phycitinae
- Genus: Eulogia; Heinrich, 1956
- Species: E. ochrifrontella

Binomial name
- Eulogia ochrifrontella (Zeller, 1875)

Synonyms
- Ephestia ochrifrontella Zeller, 1875; Euzophera ochrifrontella

= Eulogia ochrifrontella =

Species of moth

Eulogia is a monotypic snout moth genus described by Carl Heinrich in 1956. Its only species is Eulogia ochrifrontella, the broad-banded eulogia moth, described by Philipp Christoph Zeller in 1875. It is found in most of North America, including British Columbia, Florida, Illinois, Maine, Manitoba, Massachusetts, Minnesota, New Jersey, Oklahoma, Ontario, Pennsylvania, Tennessee, Virginia and Washington.

The wingspan is 11–15 mm. Adults are on wing in June and July.

The larvae feed on Carya illinoinensis, Quercus and Malus species and possibly Amelanchier alnifolia.
