= Coenochroa bipunctella =

Scientific classification
- Domain: Eukaryota
- Kingdom: Animalia
- Phylum: Arthropoda
- Class: Insecta
- Order: Lepidoptera
- Family: Pyralidae
- Genus: Coenochroa
- Species: C. bipunctella

Binomial name
- Coenochroa bipunctella (Barnes & McDunnough, 1913)

Synonyms
- Alamosa bipunctella Barnes & McDunnough, 1913

Species of moth

Coenochroa bipunctella, the sand dune panic grass moth, is a species of snout moth in the genus Coenochroa. It was described by William Barnes and James Halliday McDunnough in 1913, and is known from the United States, including Florida, Arizona and Maryland.
