= Rhynchephestia =

Scientific classification
- Kingdom: Animalia
- Phylum: Arthropoda
- Class: Insecta
- Order: Lepidoptera
- Family: Pyralidae
- Subfamily: Phycitinae
- Genus: Rhynchephestia; Hampson, 1930
- Species: R. rhabdotis

Binomial name
- Rhynchephestia rhabdotis Hampson, 1930

Genus of moths

Rhynchephestia is a monotypic moth genus of the family Pyralidae described by George Hampson in 1930. Its single species, Rhynchephestia rhabdotis, described by the same author in the same year, is endemic to the Hawaiian island of Maui.
