= Cavihemiptilocera =

Scientific classification
- Kingdom: Animalia
- Phylum: Arthropoda
- Class: Insecta
- Order: Lepidoptera
- Family: Pyralidae
- Subfamily: Phycitinae
- Genus: Cavihemiptilocera; Neunzig, 2006
- Species: C. exoleta

Binomial name
- Cavihemiptilocera exoleta (Zeller, 1881)

Synonyms
- Myelois exoleta Zeller 1881

Genus of moths

Cavihemiptilocera is a monotypic snout moth genus described by Herbert H. Neunzig in 2006. Its single species, Cavihemiptilocera exoleta, described by Philipp Christoph Zeller in 1881, was found in Colombia.
