= Asemeia aprepia =

Scientific classification
- Kingdom: Animalia
- Phylum: Arthropoda
- Clade: Pancrustacea
- Class: Insecta
- Order: Lepidoptera
- Family: Pyralidae
- Subfamily: Phycitinae
- Genus: Asemeia; Hampson, 1930
- Species: A. aprepia

Binomial name
- Asemeia aprepia Hampson, 1930

Synonyms
- Asemia Whalley, 1970

Genus of moths

Asemeia is a genus of snout moths. It was described by George Hampson in 1930 and contains the species Asemeia aprepia. It is found in Sri Lanka.
