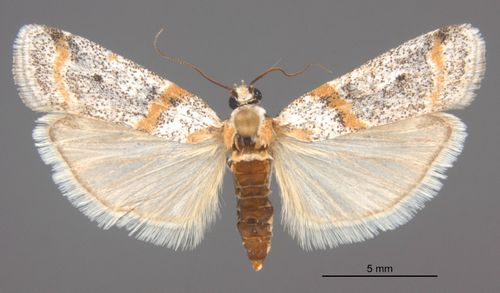

Scientific classification
- Kingdom: Animalia
- Phylum: Arthropoda
- Clade: Pancrustacea
- Class: Insecta
- Order: Lepidoptera
- Family: Pyralidae
- Genus: Acroncosa
- Species: A. albiflavella

Binomial name
- Acroncosa albiflavella Barnes & McDunnough, 1917

= Acroncosa albiflavella =

Species of moth

Acroncosa albiflavella is a species of moth of the family Pyralidae, of the order Lepidoptera. Acroncosa albiflavella was described by William Barnes and James Halliday McDunnough in 1917. It is found in western North America, including New Mexico and California.

The wingspan is 18–21 mm. Adults have white forewings. The transverse white lines are lost in the ground color and the antemedial line is indicated only by a broad oblique inner orange band extending from the inner margin to the costa. The subterminal line is indicated by a similar, narrower, sinuate, outer orange band, the latter terminating at the costa in a small blackish spot. There is a well-contrasted black discal dot at the lower, outer angle of the cell and a smaller black dot on the inner margin of the subbasal orange band. The hindwings are whitish with a very faint ocherous or smoky tint.
