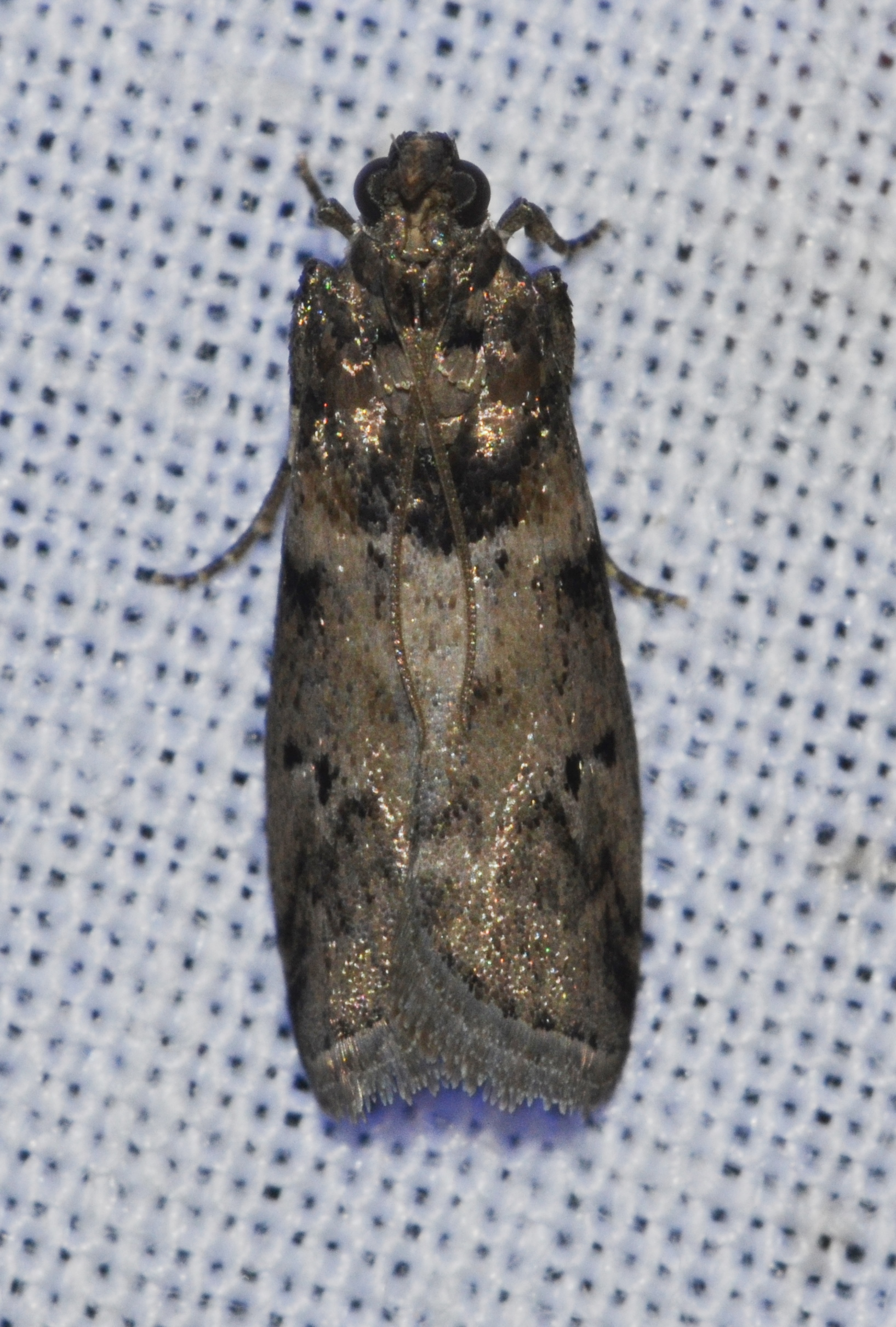
- Salebriaria annulosella

Scientific classification
- Domain: Eukaryota
- Kingdom: Animalia
- Phylum: Arthropoda
- Class: Insecta
- Order: Lepidoptera
- Family: Pyralidae
- Tribe: Phycitini
- Genus: Salebriaria; Heinrich, 1956

= Salebriaria =

Genus of moths

Salebriaria is a genus of snout moths. It was described by Carl Heinrich in 1956.

== Species ==
- Salebriaria ademptandella (Dyar, 1908)
- Salebriaria annulosella (Ragonot, 1887)
- Salebriaria bella Neunzig, 1988
- Salebriaria borealis Neunzig, 1988
- Salebriaria carolynae Neunzig, 1988
- Salebriaria chisosensis Neunzig, 1988
- Salebriaria engeli (Dyar, 1906)
- Salebriaria equivoca Neunzig, 1988
- Salebriaria fasciata Neunzig, 1988
- Salebriaria fergusonella (A. Blanchard & Knudson, 1983)
- Salebriaria floridana Neunzig, 2003
- Salebriaria grandidentalis Neunzig, 1988
- Salebriaria integra Neunzig, 1988
- Salebriaria kanawha Neunzig, 2003
- Salebriaria maximella Neunzig, 1988
- Salebriaria nubiferella (Ragonot, 1887)
- Salebriaria pallidella Neunzig, 2003
- Salebriaria pumilella (Ragonot, 1887)
- Salebriaria robustella Dyar, 1908
- Salebriaria roseopunctella Neunzig, 2003
- Salebriaria rufimaculatella Neunzig, 1988
- Salebriaria simpliciella Neunzig, 1988
- Salebriaria squamopalpiella Neunzig, 1988
- Salebriaria tenebrosella (Hulst, 1887)
- Salebriaria turpidella (Ragonot, 1888)
