= Flour moth =

The term flour moth refers to certain small moths of the family Pyralidae (snout moths, waxmoths), whose caterpillars are a pest of flour:

- Ephestia kuehniella (Mediterranean flour moth, Indian flour moth)
- Plodia interpunctella (Indianmeal moth)

These two are closely related. They can easily be distinguished by their forewing coloration: the Mediterranean flour moth has light grey forewings with tiny dark specks, appearing uniformly grey from a distance. The Indianmeal moth has bicolored forewings, with the proximal part light grey and the distal part dark or reddish grey.

Pyralis farinalis, a somewhat more distantly related and more robust snout moth, is known as meal moth. Its caterpillars have similar habits.
