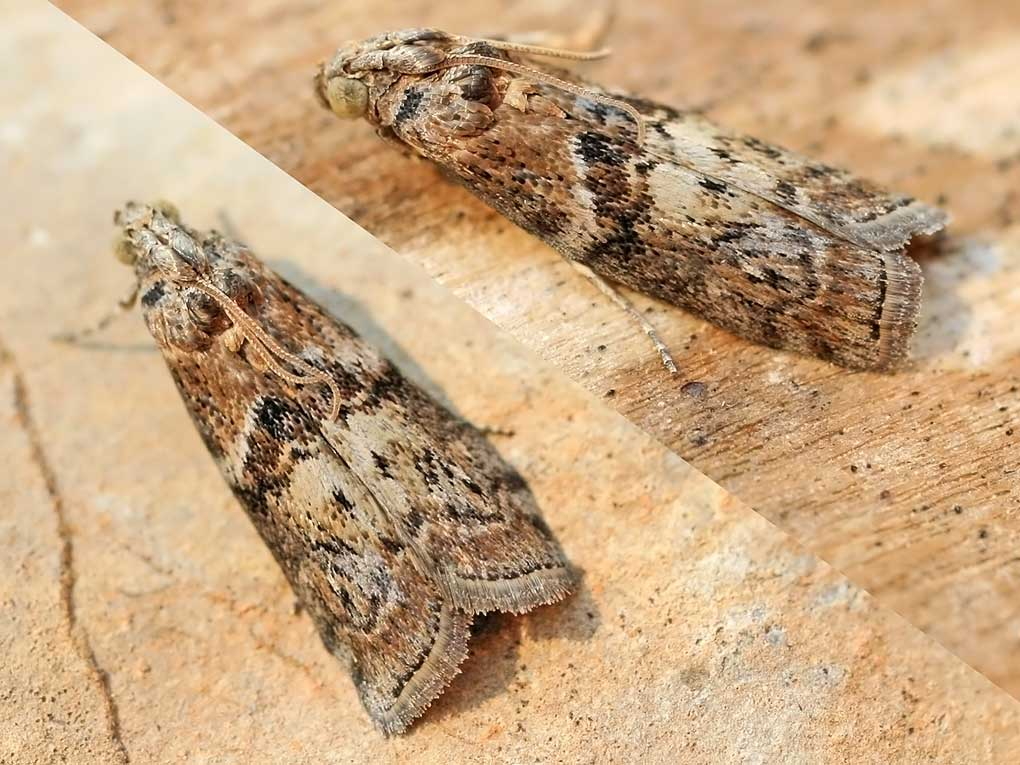
- Imago of unidentified Acrobasis species (tribe Phycitini) from Tourves (Var, France)

Scientific classification
- Kingdom: Animalia
- Phylum: Arthropoda
- Clade: Pancrustacea
- Class: Insecta
- Order: Lepidoptera
- Family: Pyralidae
- Subfamily: Phycitinae; Zeller, 1839

Type species
- Tinea spissicella Fabricius, 1777

Diversity
- 4 tribes (and see text); 600 genera 4000 species

Synonyms
- Anerastiinae Ragonot, 1885; Hypsotropinae Hampson, 1918; Peoriinae Hulst, 1890

= Phycitinae =

Subfamily of moths

The Phycitinae are a subfamily of snout moths (family Pyralidae). Even though the Pyralidae subfamilies are all quite diverse, Phycitinae stand out even by standards of their family: with over 600 genera considered valid and more than 4000 species placed here at present, they unite up more than three-quarters of living snout moth diversity. Together with the closely related Epipaschiinae, they are apparently the most advanced lineage of snout moths.

Phycitinae occur all over Earth's land masses, except in completely inhospitable areas; the majority of species has a tropical distribution however. Phycitinae have even been found on very remote oceanic islands, and a few species have been intentionally or unintentionally distributed by humans beyond their native range.

The subfamily was established as a systematic group by Philipp Christoph Zeller in 1839, who called them "Phycideen". The type genus of Phycitinae is Phycidea Zeller, 1839, with Tinea sinuella Fabricius, 1794 as type species. Phycidea is nowadays considered a synonym of the genus Homoeosoma.

Dioryctria abietella (Denis & Schiffermüller) has reproductive organs and spermatophore that are morphologically similar to those of other Lepidoptera. Many females had eggs in their bulla seminalis, but they didn't entirely obstruct sperm transportation. The spermatophore's opening end has a serrulate surface with a tiny horn. These microstructures are most likely used to keep the ductus seminalis opening aligned.

== Description ==
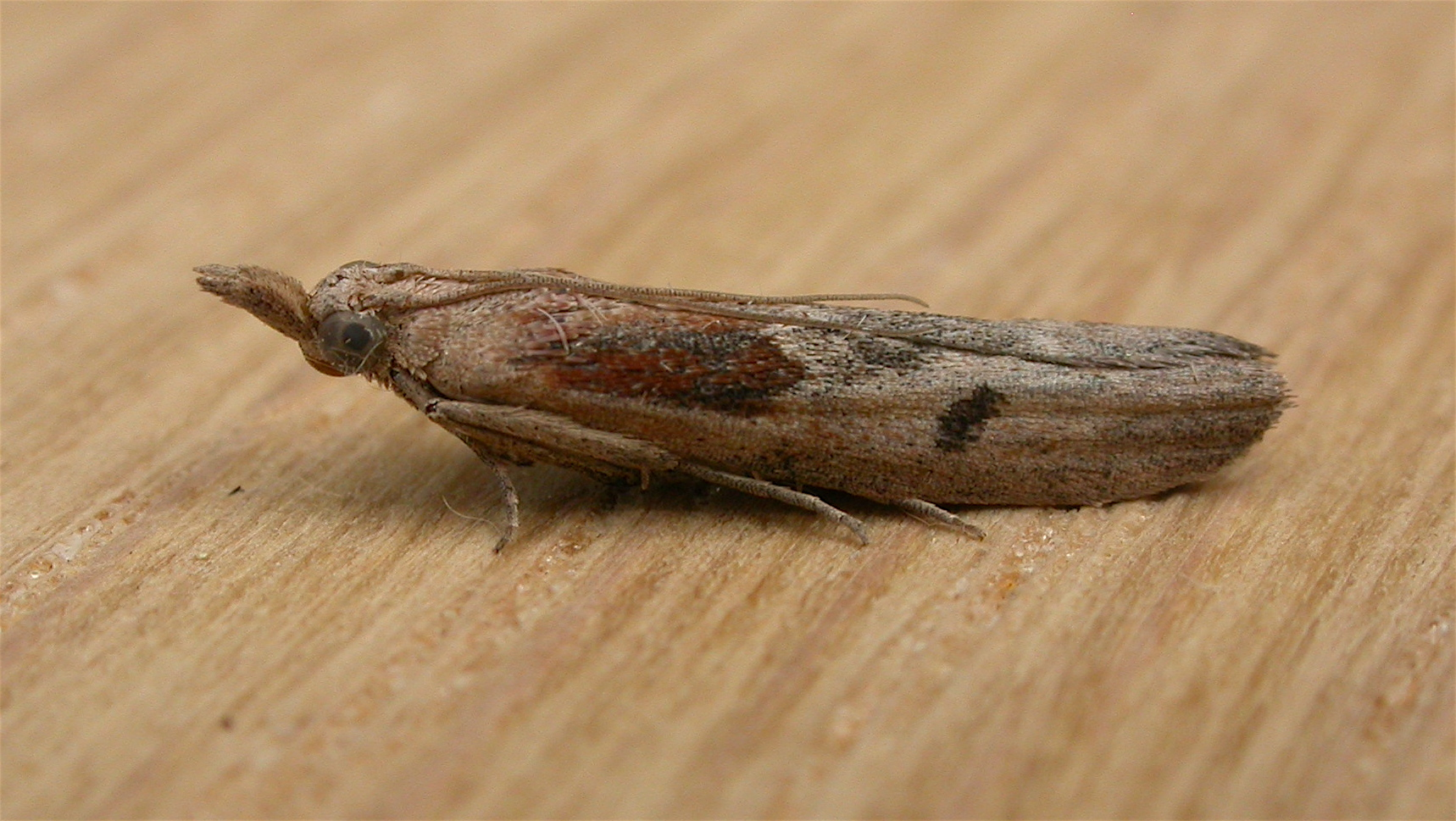
Imago of unidentified Phycitinae species from Aranda, Australian Capital Territory

In general, Phycitinae are smallish and slender-bodied moths, resembling fungus moths (family Tineidae) in appearance, though they have the well-developed proboscis typical of snout moths and in many cases also the tell-tale "snout" consisting of elongated and straight labial palps. They are usually inconspicuous; while the forewings of some are quite prominently patterned, even these have usually rather nondescript greyish-brown colours and in the natural environment the pattern is cryptic. Yet a few species of Phycitinae, such as Oncocera semirubella, are unusually brightly coloured by moth standards, while those of genus Myelois resemble members of unrelated "micromoth" family Yponomeutidae and like these are called "ermine moths" due to their bright white forewings with tiny black spots.

Despite their diversity, the group is considered by and large monophyletic as traditionally circumscribed. Due to the sheer number of taxa contained here, this has not been thoroughly tested, and some little-known genera traditionally included in the Phycitinae may of course simply be convergent and do not really belong here. Altogether however, the mesothorax of the caterpillars – with the sclerotised (hardened) ring around the base of seta SD1 – as well as the identical frenula of male and female adults' wings – a single bristle composed of several acanthae – are held to be characteristic autapomorphies by which the Phycitinae can be recognized. Furthermore, in the female genitalia of this subfamily the ductus seminalis originates in the corpus bursae. A useful character in the field is that the forewings of many adult Phycitinae lack one or more veins, usually the seventh one.

These moths may resemble caddisflies, but caddisfly antennae point forwards while Phycitinae antennae curve backwards.

== Ecology ==
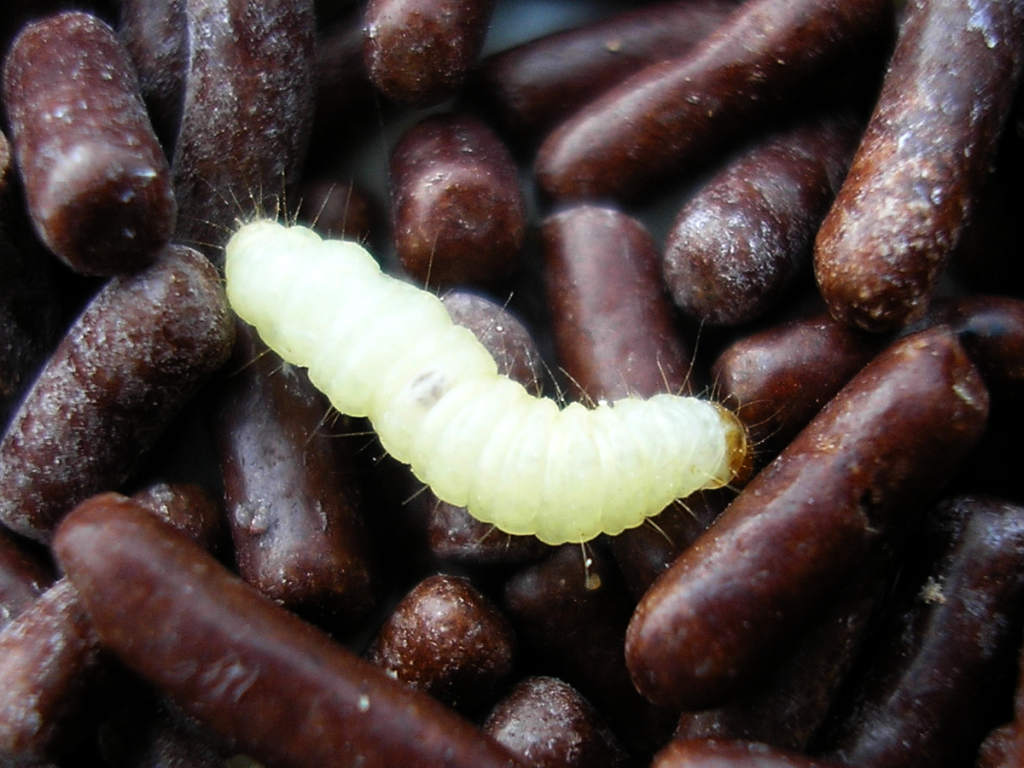
Indian mealmoth (Plodia interpunctella) caterpillar infesting chocolate sprinkles

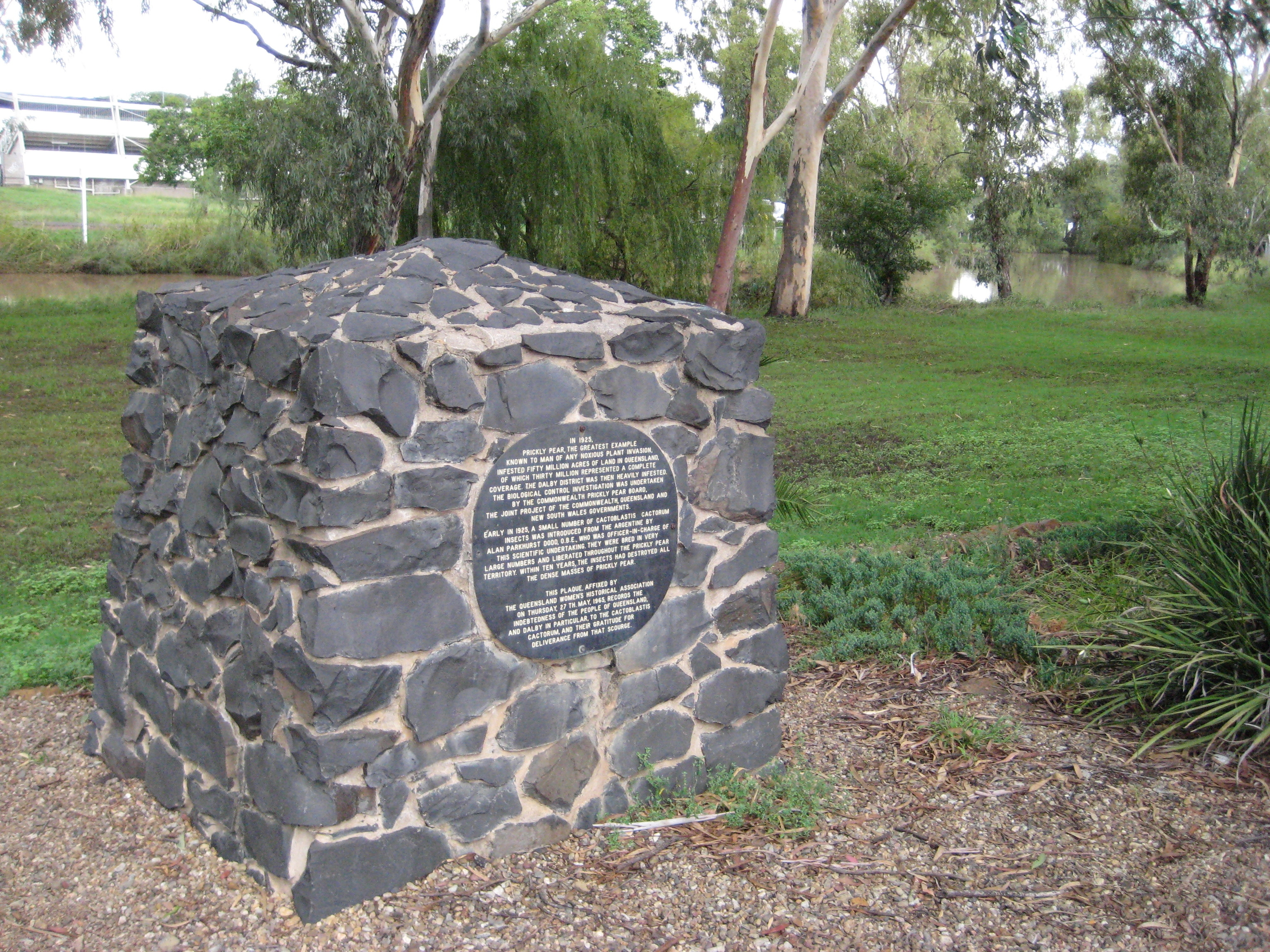
Monument to the South American cactus moth (Cactoblastis cactorum), Dalby, Queensland, Australia

Phycitinae caterpillars are mostly leaf rolling, but some are inquilines in plant galls or seed feeders, and a wide range of habitats are utilized. This subfamily even features some aquatic and predatory caterpillars. The latter, e.g. Laetilia, can be beneficial in agriculture, as they eat small Hemiptera such as Sternorrhyncha. Others have been used in biological pest control against invasive plants, for example the stem-boring caterpillars of Arcola malloi which destroy alligator weed (Alternanthera philoxeroides), an originally South American plant that has spread around the Pacific Rim to the detriment of local ecosystems.

Yet again others – namely the "carob moths" and "flour moths" of genera Cadra, Ephestia and Plodia, as well as some species of Ectomyelois and Etiella – are themselves pests of economic significance; the aforementioned genera's caterpillars infest dry vegetable foods (such as grain and nuts), while others (e.g. Dioryctria) are pests of living plants. Ecological relationships and interaction with humans is not always clear cut in this large group; the famous South American cactus moth (Cactoblastis cactorum) from the Paraná Basin is quite beneficial by keeping down invasive prickly pears (Opuntia) wherever neither it nor these cacti are native, such as in Australia. It is a polyphagous species however, and having been introduced to comparable climates in Northern Hemisphere America, it is wreaking havoc in Mexican and the southern United States' Opuntia farms. Similarly, in A. philoxeroides control, care must be taken not to harm native species of the widespread genus Alternanthera, many of which are highly valued aquarium plants. A. malloi is also not fully monophagous and will for example eat sessile joyweed (A. sessilis), which though a nuisance weed where introduced is not known to be strongly invasive.

== Systematics ==
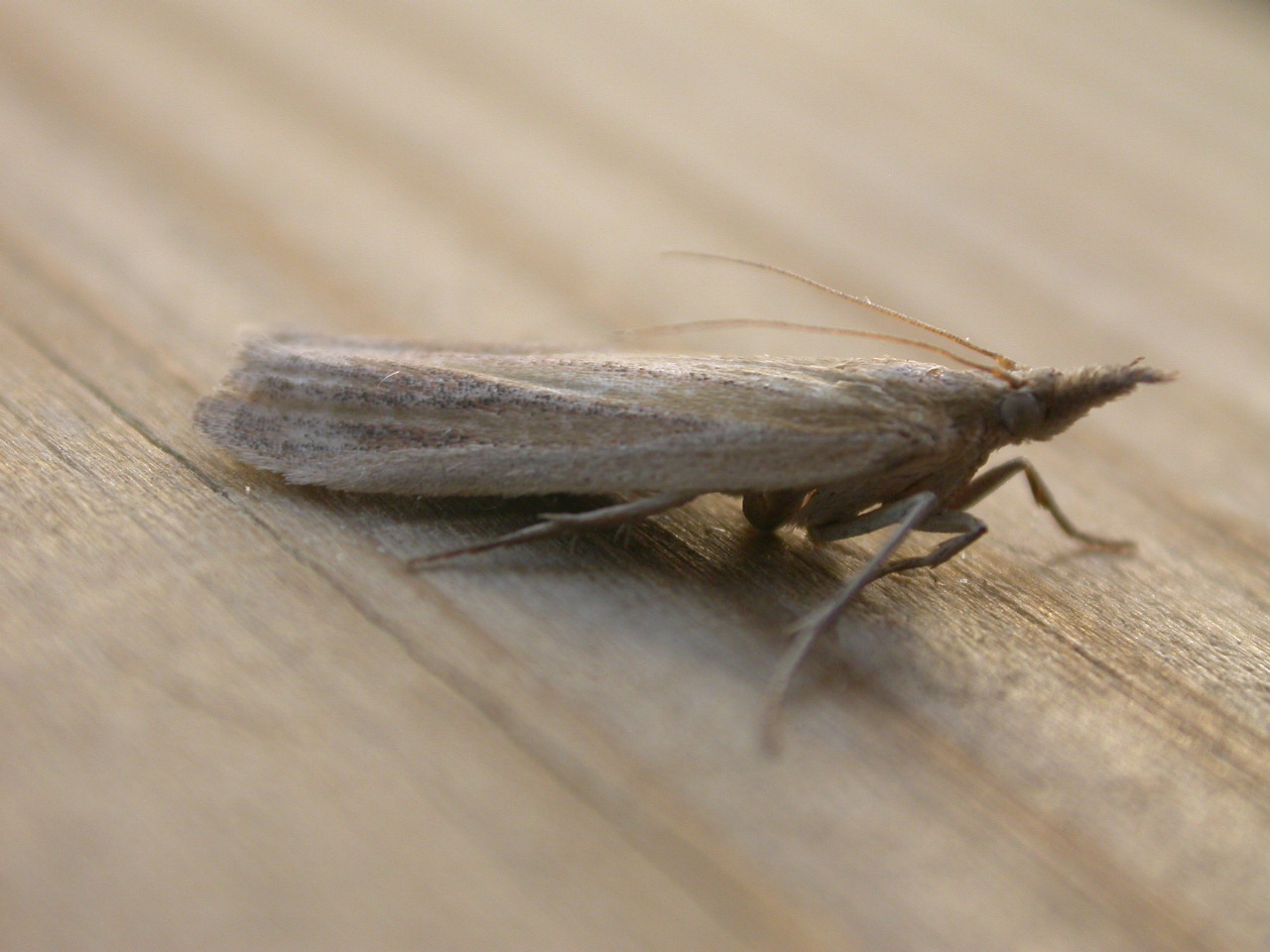
Imago of Ematheudes punctella (Anerastiini)

Due to the large diversity, the phylogeny and systematics of the Phycitinae is by no means fully resolved, though there is progress towards this goal. As noted above, some genera placed in this subfamily might actually belong elsewhere; particularly some of those that cannot be assigned firmly to one of the main Phycitinae subdivisions (incertae sedis) are interesting in this regard. Delimitation versus the Epipaschiinae – generally considered the closest living relatives of the present subfamily – may thus warrant more attention, but altogether, considering the sheer size of this group, Phycitinae have not been particularly challenging as regards their taxonomy and systematics.

New genera of Phycitinae are still being established and others are revalidated in our time. Some genera widely recognized are monotypic, but might include further undiscovered species. Some, on the other hand, might not be valid. Despite the review of genera progressing, the large number of Phycitinae taxa means that a lot of genera have not been reviewed since the 1956 landmark studies by United States Department of Agriculture entomologist Carl Heinrich and Hans Georg Amsel of the State Museum of Natural History Karlsruhe, if not since longer.

=== Tribes ===
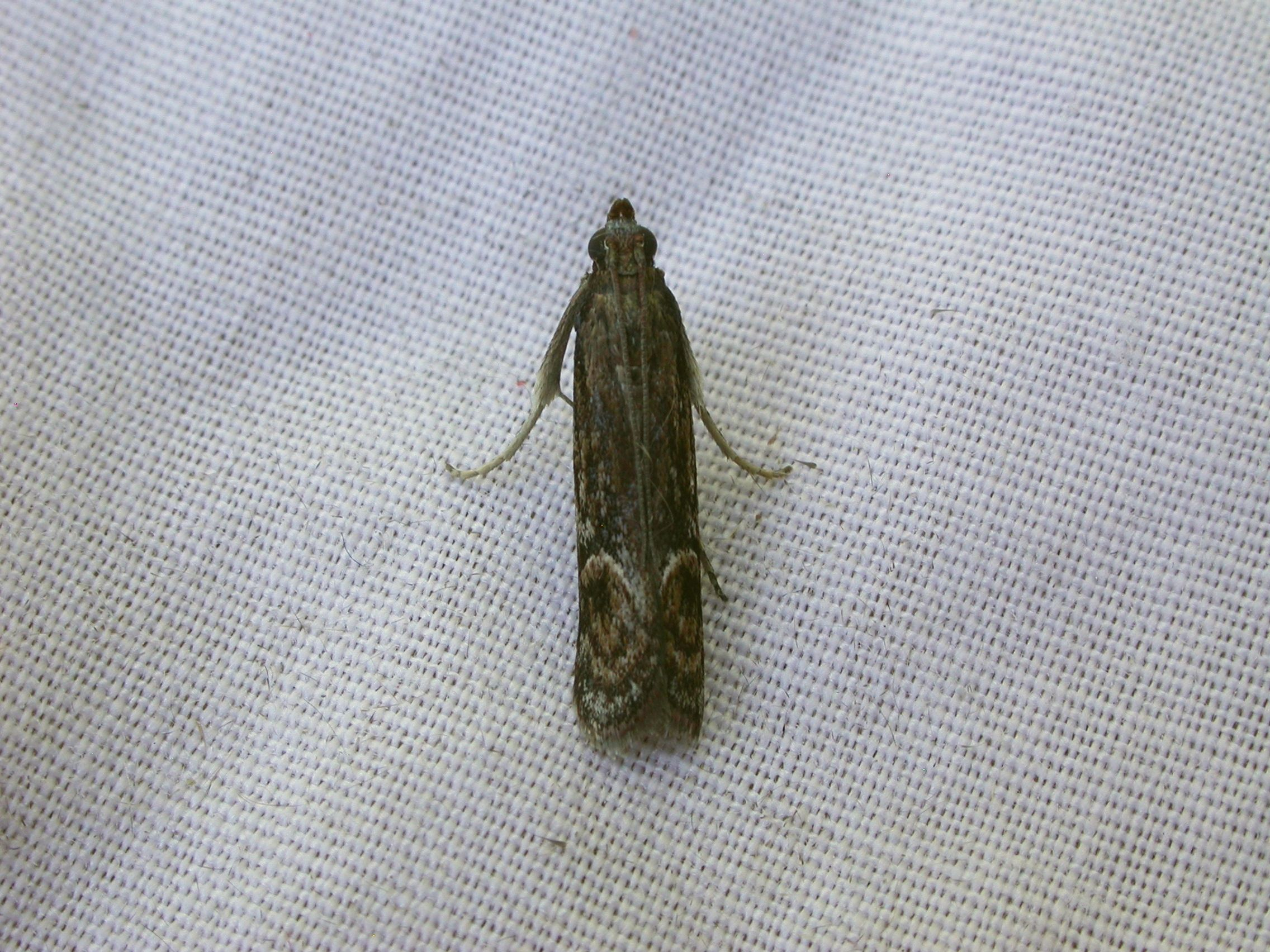
Imago of Balanomis encyclia (Cryptoblabini)

A large part of the subfamily is divided among four tribes of various size. Some notable genera and species are also listed:

Anerastiini Ragonot, 1885

- About 64 genera, see main article

Cabniini Roesler, 1968

- Cabnia
- Ernophthora
- Euageta

Cryptoblabini Roesler, 1968

- Balanomis Meyrick, 1887
- Balinskyia Leraut G., 2019
- Berastagia Roesler & Küppers, 1979
- Cryptadia Turner, 1913
- Cryptoblabes Zeller, 1848
- Cryptozophera Roesler & Küppers, 1979
- Procunea Hampson, 1930 (=Kobesia Roesler, 1983)
- Pseudodavara Roesler & Küppers, 1979
- Spatulipalpia Ragonot, 1893
- Xylia Leraut G., 2019

Phycitini

- About 150 genera, see main article

=== Genera incertae sedis ===
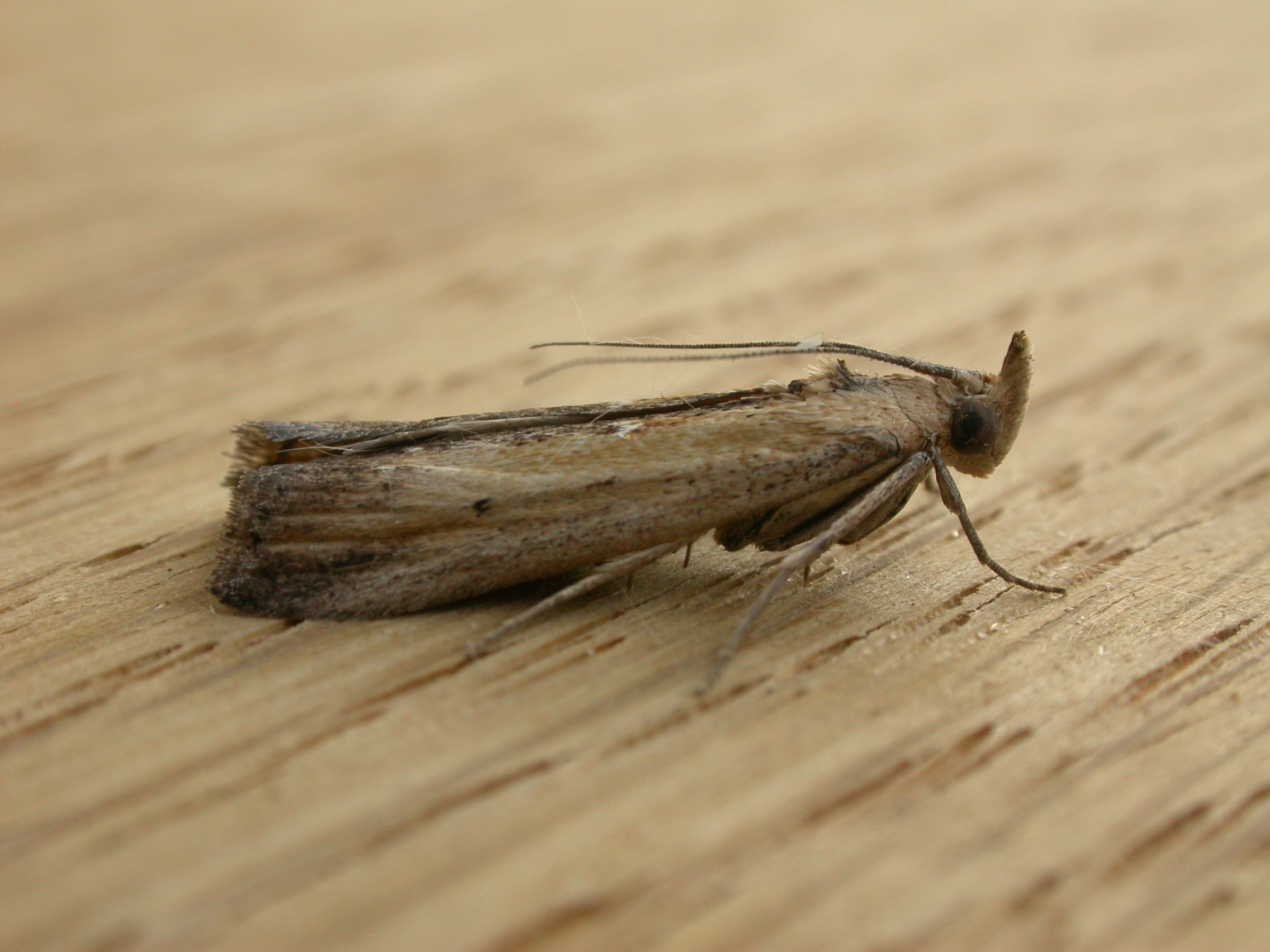
Imago of Morosaphycita oculiferella, a Phycitinae with unclear affinities

Some Phycitinae genera and species whose affiliation as to tribe is unclear are:

- Abachausia
- Afromylea
- Amyelois
- Anabasis
- Asemeia Hampson, 1930
- Aspithroides
- Australephestiodes Neunzig, 1988
- Baphala Heinrich, 1956
- Cabotella
- Cantheleamima
- Caristanius
- Caviana
- Cavihemiptilocera
- Ceuthelea
- Chorrera
- Citripestis
- Coenochroa
- Coleothrix
- Davara
- Didia
- Difundella
- Elasmopalpus C. É. Blanchard, 1852
- Ephestiodes Ragonot, 1887
- Etielloides Shibuya, 1928
- Eulogia – broad-banded eulogia moth
- Furcata Du, Sung & Wu, 2005
- Genophantis
- Gunungia Roesler & Küppers, 1979
- Heras Heinrich, 1956
- Irakia Amsel, 1955
- Madiama Walker, 1864
- Martia Ragonot, 1887
- Monoptilota – lima-bean vine borer
- Morosaphycita Horak, 1997
  - Morosaphycita oculiferella
  - Morosaphycita morosalis
- Nephopterygia Amsel, 1965
- Nevacolima Neunzig, 1994
- Oreana Hulst, 1888
- Oxybia Rebel, 1901
- Pararotruda Roesler, 1965
- Parematheudes Shaffer, 1997
- Prorophora Ragonot, 1887
- Pseudanabasis Du, Sung & Wu, 2009
- Rhodophaea Guenée, 1845
- Rhynchephestia
- Rumatha Heinrich, 1939
- Salebriaria Heinrich, 1956
- Salinaria Rebel in Staudinger & Rebel, 1901
- Sematoneura Ragonot, 1888
- Sporophyla Meyrick, 1905
- Thiallela Walker, 1863
- Tlascala Hulst, 1890
- Tsaraphycis Viette, 1970
- Tumoriala Neunzig & Solis, 2005
- Ufa Walker, 1863
- Unadilla Hulst, 1890
  - Unadilla bidensana
  - Unadilla humeralis
- Zamagiria

Delcina was originally included in the Phycitinae, as it somewhat resembles Monoptilota; it seems impossible to assign with certainty to any one of the major lineages of snout moths however.
