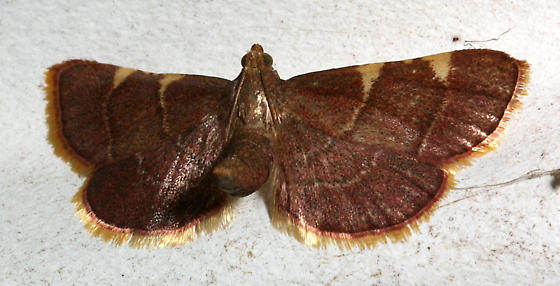
- Dolichomia olinalis

Scientific classification
- Domain: Eukaryota
- Kingdom: Animalia
- Phylum: Arthropoda
- Class: Insecta
- Order: Lepidoptera
- Family: Pyralidae
- Tribe: Pyralini
- Genus: Dolichomia; Ragonot, 1891

= Dolichomia =

Genus of moths

Dolichomia is a genus of snout moths in the subfamily Phycitinae. It was described by Émile Louis Ragonot in 1891. It is mostly treated as a synonym of Hypsopygia or Herculia, which in turn is also mostly treated as a synonym of Hypsopygia. Others sources retain it as a valid genus however.

== Species ==
- Dolichomia amoenalis (Möschler, 1882)
- Dolichomia binodulalis (Zeller, 1872) - pink-fringed dolichomia moth
- Dolichomia craspedalis (Hampson, 1906)
- Dolichomia datames (Druce, 1900)
- Dolichomia decetialis (Druce, 1900)
- Dolichomia graafialis (Snellen, 1975)
- Dolichomia impurpuratalis (Dognin, 1910)
- Dolichomia nigrapuncta (Kaye, 1901)
- Dolichomia olinalis (Guenée, 1854)
- Dolichomia phanerostola (Hampson, 1917)
- Dolichomia planalis (Grote, 1880)
- Dolichomia plumbeoprunalis (Hampson, 1917)
- Dolichomia resectalis (Lederer, 1863)
- Dolichomia thymetusalis (Walker, 1859) - spruce needleworm moth
- Dolichomia vernacularis (Berg, 1874)
