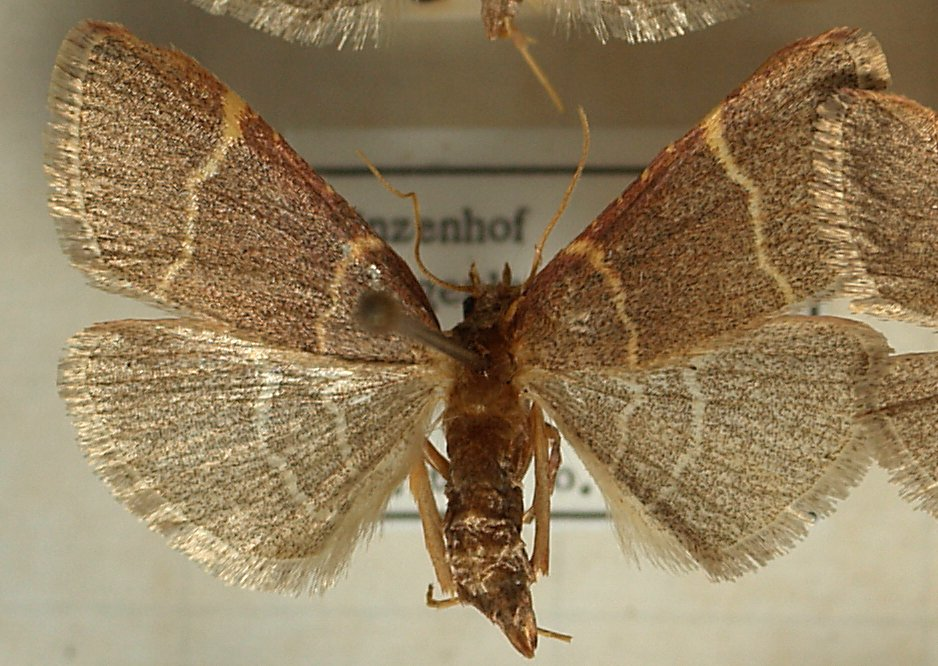
- Adult specimen of Ocrasa glaucinalis, sometimes separated in Orthopygia

Scientific classification
- Kingdom: Animalia
- Phylum: Arthropoda
- Clade: Pancrustacea
- Class: Insecta
- Order: Lepidoptera
- Family: Pyralidae
- Tribe: Pyralini
- Genus: Ocrasa; Walker, [1866]

Synonyms
- Orthopygia Ragonot, 1891 (but see text); Parasopia Möschler, 1890

= Ocrasa =

Genus of moths

Ocrasa is a genus of moths belonging to the family Pyralidae. The genus is mostly treated as a synonym of Hypsopygia. If considered valid, the genus includes many species which were formerly included in Herculia. In addition, the proposed genus Orthopygia, which some authors consider a separate (and sometimes monotypic) lineage is here merged with Ocrasa. The latter two genera are also mostly merged with Hypsopygia however.

== Selected species ==
- Ocrasa acerasta
- Ocrasa albidalis Walker, [1866]
- Ocrasa chytriodes (Turner, 1911)
- Ocrasa decoloralis (Lederer, 1863)
- Ocrasa fulvocilialis – sometimes still in Herculia
- Ocrasa glaucinalis – sometimes in Orthopygia
- Ocrasa nannodes – sometimes in Orthopygia
- Ocrasa nostralis (Guenée, 1854)
- Ocrasa placens – sometimes in Orthopygia
- Ocrasa repetita (Butler, 1887)
- Ocrasa tripartialis (Herrich-Schäffer, 1871)
