= Hypsopygia jezoensis =

Scientific classification
- Kingdom: Animalia
- Phylum: Arthropoda
- Clade: Pancrustacea
- Class: Insecta
- Order: Lepidoptera
- Family: Pyralidae
- Genus: Hypsopygia
- Species: H. jezoensis

Binomial name
- Hypsopygia jezoensis (Shibuya, 1928)

Synonyms
- Herculia jezoensis Shibuya, 1928; Herculia nigralis Shibuya, 1928

Species of moth

Hypsopygia jezoensis is a species of snout moth in the genus Hypsopygia. It was described by Shibuya in 1928. It is found in Taiwan and Japan.

The wingspan is 27 mm.
