= Hypsopygia taiwanalis =

Scientific classification
- Kingdom: Animalia
- Phylum: Arthropoda
- Clade: Pancrustacea
- Class: Insecta
- Order: Lepidoptera
- Family: Pyralidae
- Genus: Hypsopygia
- Species: H. taiwanalis

Binomial name
- Hypsopygia taiwanalis (Shibuya, 1928)

Synonyms
- Herculia taiwanalis Shibuya, 1928

Species of moth

Hypsopygia taiwanalis is a species of snout moth in the genus Hypsopygia. It was described by Shibuya in 1928. It is found in Taiwan.
