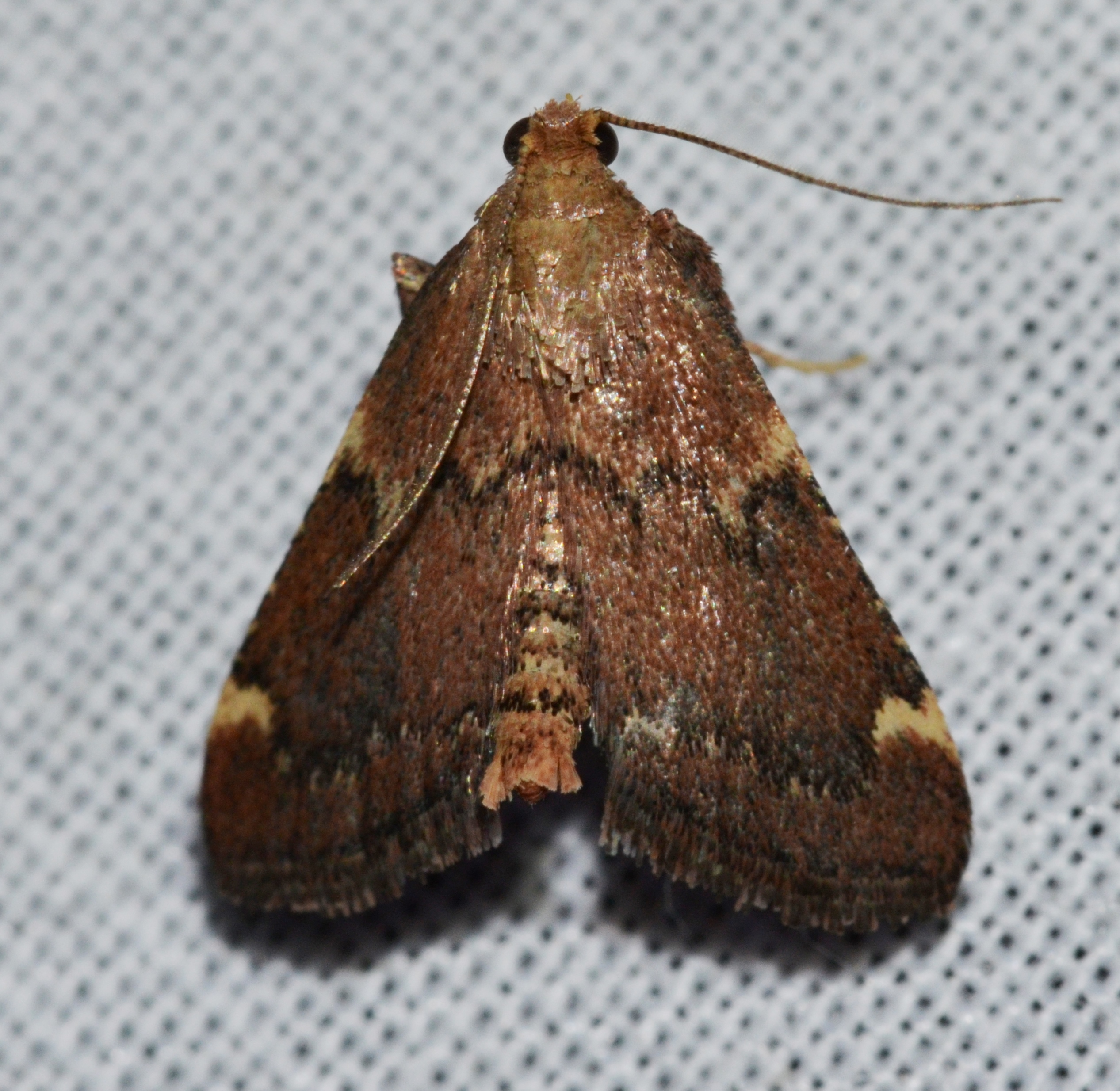

Scientific classification
- Kingdom: Animalia
- Phylum: Arthropoda
- Clade: Pancrustacea
- Class: Insecta
- Order: Lepidoptera
- Family: Pyralidae
- Genus: Hypsopygia
- Species: H. intermedialis

Binomial name
- Hypsopygia intermedialis (Walker, 1862)

Synonyms
- Pyralis intermedialis Walker, 1862; Dolichomia intermedialis; Pseudasopia intermedialis; Herculia intermedialis; Pseudasopia squamealis Grote, 1873; Pyralis sodalis Walker, 1869

= Hypsopygia intermedialis =

Species of moth

Hypsopygia intermedialis, the red-shawled moth, is a species of snout moth in the genus Hypsopygia. It is found in the United States, southern Canada and Haiti.

The wingspan is about 16 mm. Adults are on wing in June and July.
