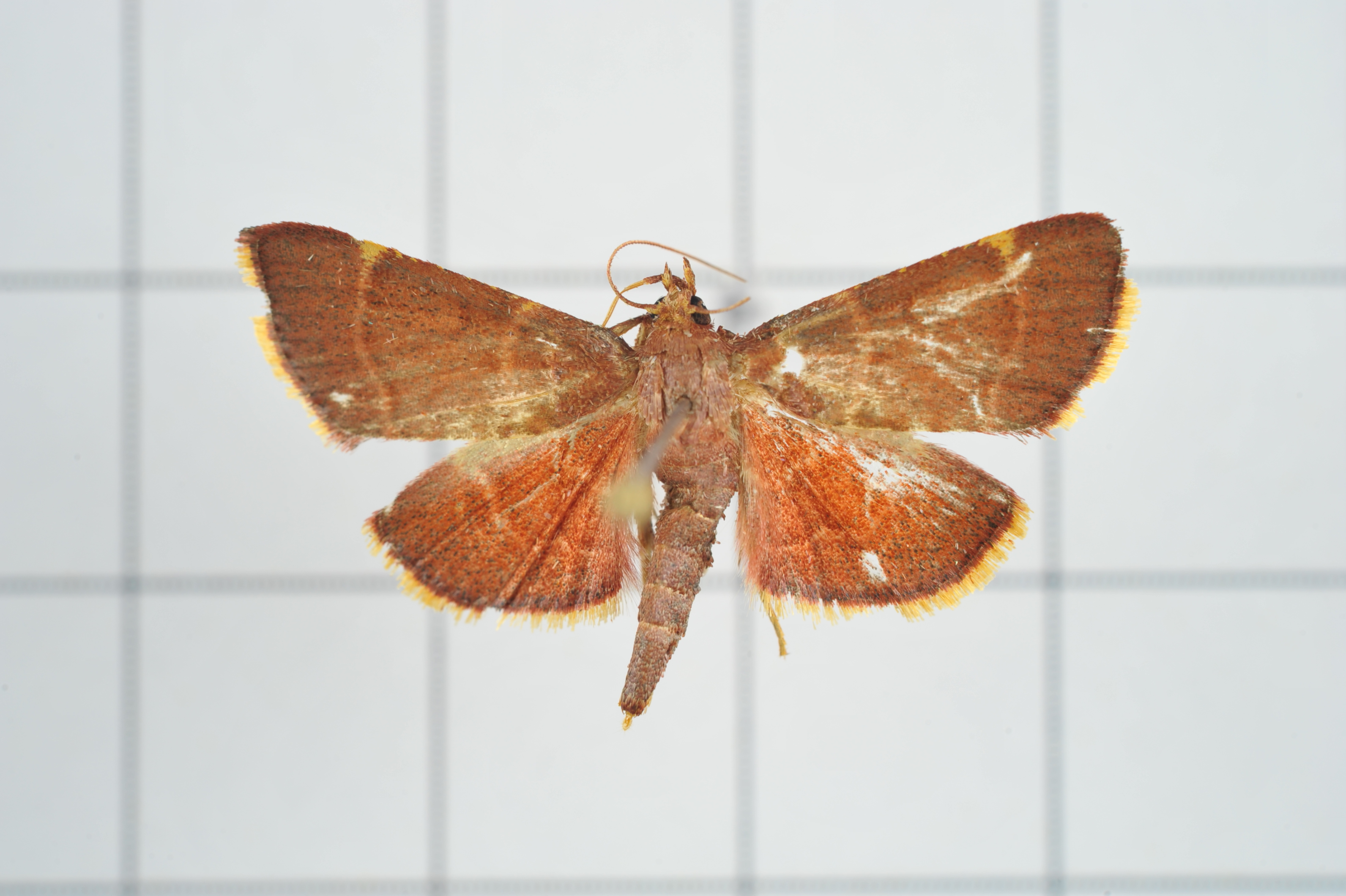

Scientific classification
- Kingdom: Animalia
- Phylum: Arthropoda
- Clade: Pancrustacea
- Class: Insecta
- Order: Lepidoptera
- Family: Pyralidae
- Genus: Hypsopygia
- Species: H. pelasgalis

Binomial name
- Hypsopygia pelasgalis (Walker, 1859)

Synonyms
- Pyralis pelasgalis Walker, 1859; Herculia pelasgalis; Herculia angusti Strand, 1919; Hypsopygia japonica Warren, 1891

= Hypsopygia pelasgalis =

Species of moth

Hypsopygia pelasgalis is a species of snout moth in the genus Hypsopygia. It was described by Francis Walker in 1859, and is known from Korea, Japan, China and Taiwan.

The wingspan is 25–33 mm. The colour of the wings varies from reddish brown to dark blackish brown. Adults are on wing from July to August.

The larvae feed on Quercus acutissima.
