= Hypsopygia drabicilialis =

Scientific classification
- Kingdom: Animalia
- Phylum: Arthropoda
- Clade: Pancrustacea
- Class: Insecta
- Order: Lepidoptera
- Family: Pyralidae
- Genus: Hypsopygia
- Species: H. drabicilialis

Binomial name
- Hypsopygia drabicilialis (Yamanaka, 1968)

Synonyms
- Herculia drabicilialis Yamanaka, 1968

Species of moth

Hypsopygia drabicilialis is a species of snout moth in the genus Hypsopygia. It was described by Hiroshi Yamanaka in 1968. It is found in Japan.
