= Hypsopygia flavamaculata =

Scientific classification
- Kingdom: Animalia
- Phylum: Arthropoda
- Clade: Pancrustacea
- Class: Insecta
- Order: Lepidoptera
- Family: Pyralidae
- Genus: Hypsopygia
- Species: H. flavamaculata

Binomial name
- Hypsopygia flavamaculata Shaffer, Nielsen & Horak, 1996

Synonyms
- Hypsopyga laticilialis Rothschild, 1916 (preocc.)

Species of moth

Hypsopygia flavamaculata is a species of snout moth in the genus Hypsopygia. It was described by M. Shaffer, Ebbe Nielsen and Marianne Horak and is found in Australia.
