= Hypsopygia rudis =

Scientific classification
- Kingdom: Animalia
- Phylum: Arthropoda
- Clade: Pancrustacea
- Class: Insecta
- Order: Lepidoptera
- Family: Pyralidae
- Genus: Hypsopygia
- Species: H. rudis

Binomial name
- Hypsopygia rudis (Moore, 1888)

Synonyms
- Stemmatophora rudis Moore, 1888; Orthopygia rudis; Pyralis anpingialis Strand, 1919; Orthopygia anpingialis; Herculia anpingialis

Species of moth

Hypsopygia rudis is a species of snout moth in the genus Hypsopygia. It was described by Frederic Moore in 1888. It was described from eastern India (Darjeeling) but is also allegedly found in Taiwan It is elsewhere listed as Stemmatophora rudis Moore, 1888: 205, reflecting the original formation. (See Globiz catalog)
