= Hypsopygia alluaudalis =

Scientific classification
- Kingdom: Animalia
- Phylum: Arthropoda
- Clade: Pancrustacea
- Class: Insecta
- Order: Lepidoptera
- Family: Pyralidae
- Genus: Hypsopygia
- Species: H. alluaudalis

Binomial name
- Hypsopygia alluaudalis Leraut, 2006

Species of moth

Hypsopygia alluaudalis is a species of snout moth in the genus Hypsopygia. It was described by Patrice J.A. Leraut in 2006 and is known from Kenya.
