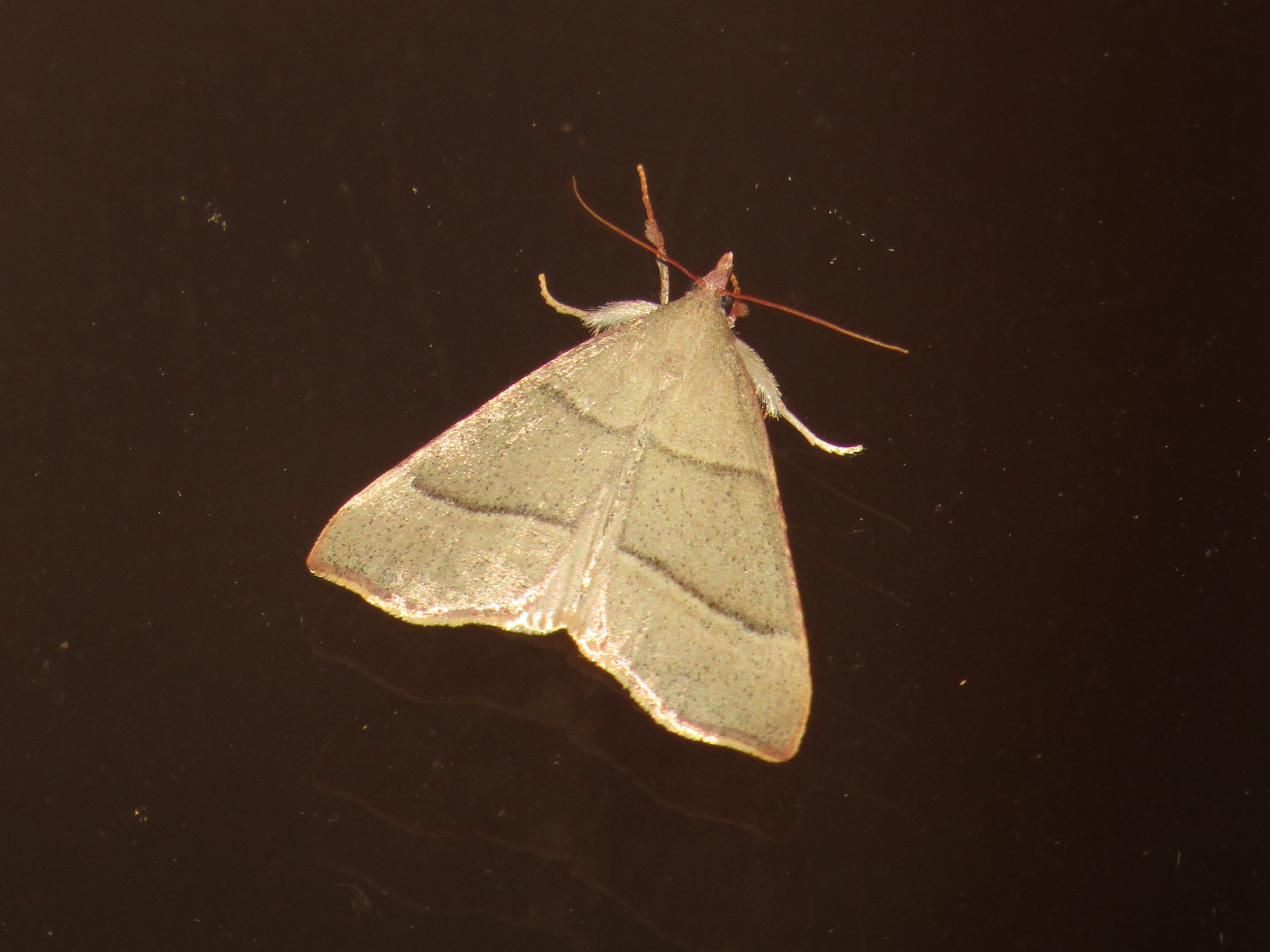
- Herculia orthogramma

Scientific classification
- Kingdom: Animalia
- Phylum: Arthropoda
- Clade: Pancrustacea
- Class: Insecta
- Order: Lepidoptera
- Family: Pyralidae
- Genus: Hypsopygia
- Species: H. orthogramma

Binomial name
- Hypsopygia orthogramma (Inoue, 1960)

Synonyms
- Herculia orthogramma Inoue, 1960

= Hypsopygia orthogramma =

Species of moth

Hypsopygia orthogramma is a species of snout moth in the genus Hypsopygia. It was described by Hiroshi Inoue in 1960. It is found in Korea and Japan.

With a wingspan of 40 mm it is the largest species in the genus Hypsopygia.
