= Etielloides sejunctella =

Scientific classification
- Kingdom: Animalia
- Phylum: Arthropoda
- Clade: Pancrustacea
- Class: Insecta
- Order: Lepidoptera
- Family: Pyralidae
- Genus: Etielloides
- Species: E. sejunctella

Binomial name
- Etielloides sejunctella (Christoph, 1881)

Synonyms
- Pempelia sejunctella Christoph, 1881

Species of moth

Etielloides sejunctella is a species of snout moth in the genus Etielloides. It was described by Hugo Theodor Christoph in 1881 and is known from China, Japan, and the Russian Far East.
