= Etielloides bipartitellus =

Scientific classification
- Kingdom: Animalia
- Phylum: Arthropoda
- Class: Insecta
- Order: Lepidoptera
- Family: Pyralidae
- Genus: Etielloides
- Species: E. bipartitellus

Binomial name
- Etielloides bipartitellus (Leech, 1889)

Synonyms
- Elamopalpus bipartitellus Leech, 1889

Species of moth

Etielloides bipartitellus is a species of snout moth in the genus Etielloides. It was described by John Henry Leech in 1889, and is known from China, Japan and Korea.
