= Hypsopygia moramangalis =

Scientific classification
- Kingdom: Animalia
- Phylum: Arthropoda
- Clade: Pancrustacea
- Class: Insecta
- Order: Lepidoptera
- Family: Pyralidae
- Genus: Hypsopygia
- Species: H. moramangalis

Binomial name
- Hypsopygia moramangalis (Marion & Viette, 1956)

Synonyms
- Herculia moramangalis Marion & Viette, 1956

Species of moth

Hypsopygia moramangalis is a species of snout moth in the genus Hypsopygia. It was described by Hubert Marion and Pierre Viette in 1956 and is known from Madagascar.
