= Etielloides =

Scientific classification
- Domain: Eukaryota
- Kingdom: Animalia
- Phylum: Arthropoda
- Class: Insecta
- Order: Lepidoptera
- Family: Pyralidae
- Subfamily: Phycitinae
- Genus: Etielloides; Shibuya, 1928

Genus of moths

Etielloides is a genus of snout moths. It was described by Shibuya in 1928.

== Species ==
- Etielloides bipartitellus (Leech, 1889)
- Etielloides curvella Shibuya, 1928
- Etielloides kogii Yamanaka, 1998
- Etielloides longipalpus Ren & Li, 2006
- Etielloides sejunctella (Christoph, 1881)
