= Hypsopygia almanalis =

Scientific classification
- Kingdom: Animalia
- Phylum: Arthropoda
- Clade: Pancrustacea
- Class: Insecta
- Order: Lepidoptera
- Family: Pyralidae
- Genus: Hypsopygia
- Species: H. almanalis

Binomial name
- Hypsopygia almanalis (Rebel, 1917)

Synonyms
- Herculia almanalis Rebel, 1917

Species of moth

Hypsopygia almanalis is a species of snout moth in the genus Hypsopygia. It was described by Rebel in 1917, and is known from Cyprus and Turkey.

The wingspan is 19–20 mm.
