= Hypsopygia suffusalis =

Scientific classification
- Kingdom: Animalia
- Phylum: Arthropoda
- Clade: Pancrustacea
- Class: Insecta
- Order: Lepidoptera
- Family: Pyralidae
- Genus: Hypsopygia
- Species: H. suffusalis

Binomial name
- Hypsopygia suffusalis (Walker, 1866)

Synonyms
- Pyralis suffusalis Walker, 1866

Species of moth

Hypsopygia suffusalis is a species of snout moth in the genus Hypsopygia. It was described by Francis Walker in 1866 and is known from India.
