= Hypsopygia purpureorufa =

Scientific classification
- Kingdom: Animalia
- Phylum: Arthropoda
- Clade: Pancrustacea
- Class: Insecta
- Order: Lepidoptera
- Family: Pyralidae
- Genus: Hypsopygia
- Species: H. purpureorufa

Binomial name
- Hypsopygia purpureorufa (Hampson, 1917)

Synonyms
- Herculia purpureorufa Hampson, 1917

Species of moth

Hypsopygia purpureorufa is a species of snout moth in the genus Hypsopygia. It was described by George Hampson in 1917. It is found in India.
