= Hypsopygia medialis =

Scientific classification
- Kingdom: Animalia
- Phylum: Arthropoda
- Clade: Pancrustacea
- Class: Insecta
- Order: Lepidoptera
- Family: Pyralidae
- Genus: Hypsopygia
- Species: H. medialis

Binomial name
- Hypsopygia medialis (Hampson, 1903)

Synonyms
- Herculia medialis Hampson, 1903

Species of moth

Hypsopygia medialis is a species of snout moth in the genus Hypsopygia. It was described by George Hampson in 1903. It is found in India.
