= Hypsopygia vulgaris =

Scientific classification
- Kingdom: Animalia
- Phylum: Arthropoda
- Clade: Pancrustacea
- Class: Insecta
- Order: Lepidoptera
- Family: Pyralidae
- Genus: Hypsopygia
- Species: H. vulgaris

Binomial name
- Hypsopygia vulgaris (Ghesquière, 1942)

Synonyms
- Herculia vulgaris Ghesquière, 1942

Species of moth

Hypsopygia vulgaris is a species of snout moth in the genus Hypsopygia. It was described by Jean Ghesquière in 1942. It is found in the Democratic Republic of the Congo.
