= Hypsopygia proboscidalis =

Scientific classification
- Kingdom: Animalia
- Phylum: Arthropoda
- Clade: Pancrustacea
- Class: Insecta
- Order: Lepidoptera
- Family: Pyralidae
- Genus: Hypsopygia
- Species: H. proboscidalis

Binomial name
- Hypsopygia proboscidalis (Strand, 1919)

Synonyms
- Pyralis proboscidalis Strand, 1919

Species of moth

Hypsopygia proboscidalis is a species of snout moth in the genus Hypsopygia. It was described by Strand in 1919. It is found in Taiwan.
