= Etielloides curvella =

Scientific classification
- Domain: Eukaryota
- Kingdom: Animalia
- Phylum: Arthropoda
- Class: Insecta
- Order: Lepidoptera
- Family: Pyralidae
- Genus: Etielloides
- Species: E. curvella

Binomial name
- Etielloides curvella Shibuya, 1928

Synonyms
- Etiella hollandella Mutuura, 1957

Species of moth

Etielloides curvella is a species of snout moth in the genus Etielloides. It was described by Shibuya in 1928, and is known from Japan.

The wingspan is 22–24 mm.
