= Hypsopygia mus =

Scientific classification
- Kingdom: Animalia
- Phylum: Arthropoda
- Clade: Pancrustacea
- Class: Insecta
- Order: Lepidoptera
- Family: Pyralidae
- Genus: Hypsopygia
- Species: H. mus

Binomial name
- Hypsopygia mus (Caradja, 1932)

Synonyms
- Herculia mus Caradja, 1932

Species of moth

Hypsopygia mus is a species of snout moth in the genus Hypsopygia. It was described by Aristide Caradja in 1932. It is found in China.
