= Hypsopygia sericea =

Scientific classification
- Kingdom: Animalia
- Phylum: Arthropoda
- Clade: Pancrustacea
- Class: Insecta
- Order: Lepidoptera
- Family: Pyralidae
- Genus: Hypsopygia
- Species: H. sericea

Binomial name
- Hypsopygia sericea Warren, 1891

Synonyms
- Herculia sericea

Species of moth

Hypsopygia sericea is a species of snout moth in the genus Hypsopygia. It was described by Warren in 1891. It is found in India.
