= Hypsopygia albilunalis =

Scientific classification
- Kingdom: Animalia
- Phylum: Arthropoda
- Clade: Pancrustacea
- Class: Insecta
- Order: Lepidoptera
- Family: Pyralidae
- Genus: Hypsopygia
- Species: H. albilunalis

Binomial name
- Hypsopygia albilunalis (Caradja, 1927)

Synonyms
- Herculia albilunalis Caradja, 1927

Species of moth

Hypsopygia albilunalis is a species of snout moth in the genus Hypsopygia. It was described by Aristide Caradja in 1927. It is found in China.
