= Hypsopygia nonusalis =

Scientific classification
- Kingdom: Animalia
- Phylum: Arthropoda
- Clade: Pancrustacea
- Class: Insecta
- Order: Lepidoptera
- Family: Pyralidae
- Genus: Hypsopygia
- Species: H. nonusalis

Binomial name
- Hypsopygia nonusalis (Walker, 1859)

Synonyms
- Pyralis nonusalis Walker, 1859; Ocrasa nonusalis; Herculia hansi Rose & Dhillon, 1980; Herculia imbecilis Shibuya, 1928.; Pyralis imbecilis Moore, 1885; Pyralis incongrua Butler, 1886; Pyralis tenuis Butler, 1880

Species of moth

Hypsopygia nonusalis is a species of snout moth in the genus Hypsopygia. It was described by Francis Walker in 1859 and is known from Malaysia, India, Sri Lanka and Taiwan.
