= Hypsopygia violaceomarginalis =

Scientific classification
- Kingdom: Animalia
- Phylum: Arthropoda
- Clade: Pancrustacea
- Class: Insecta
- Order: Lepidoptera
- Family: Pyralidae
- Genus: Hypsopygia
- Species: H. violaceomarginalis

Binomial name
- Hypsopygia violaceomarginalis (Caradja, 1935)

Synonyms
- Herculia violaceomarginalis Caradja, 1935

Species of moth

Hypsopygia violaceomarginalis is a species of snout moth in the genus Hypsopygia. It was described by Aristide Caradja in 1935. It is found in China.
