= Hypsopygia ochreicilia =

Scientific classification
- Kingdom: Animalia
- Phylum: Arthropoda
- Clade: Pancrustacea
- Class: Insecta
- Order: Lepidoptera
- Family: Pyralidae
- Genus: Hypsopygia
- Species: H. ochreicilia

Binomial name
- Hypsopygia ochreicilia (Hampson, 1891)

Synonyms
- Herculia ochreicilia Hampson, 1891; Herculia sokutsensis Strand, 1919; Orthopygia sokutsensis; Hypsopygia sokutsensis

Species of moth

Hypsopygia ochreicilia is a species of snout moth in the genus Hypsopygia. It was described by George Hampson in 1891 and is known from India and Taiwan.
