= Hypsopygia ignefimbrialis =

Scientific classification
- Kingdom: Animalia
- Phylum: Arthropoda
- Clade: Pancrustacea
- Class: Insecta
- Order: Lepidoptera
- Family: Pyralidae
- Genus: Hypsopygia
- Species: H. ignefimbrialis

Binomial name
- Hypsopygia ignefimbrialis (Hampson, 1906)

Synonyms
- Herculia ignefimbrialis Hampson, 1906

Species of moth

Hypsopygia ignefimbrialis is a species of snout moth in the genus Hypsopygia. It was described by George Hampson in 1906. It is found in Taiwan.
