= Hypsopygia flammealis =

Scientific classification
- Kingdom: Animalia
- Phylum: Arthropoda
- Clade: Pancrustacea
- Class: Insecta
- Order: Lepidoptera
- Family: Pyralidae
- Genus: Hypsopygia
- Species: H. flammealis

Binomial name
- Hypsopygia flammealis (Hampson, 1906)

Synonyms
- Herculia flammealis Hampson, 1906

Species of moth

Hypsopygia flammealis is a species of snout moth in the genus Hypsopygia. It was described by George Hampson in 1906. It is found in India.
