= Hypsopygia hoenei =

Scientific classification
- Kingdom: Animalia
- Phylum: Arthropoda
- Clade: Pancrustacea
- Class: Insecta
- Order: Lepidoptera
- Family: Pyralidae
- Genus: Hypsopygia
- Species: H. hoenei

Binomial name
- Hypsopygia hoenei (Caradja, 1932)

Synonyms
- Herculia hoenei Caradja, 1932

Species of moth

Hypsopygia hoenei is a species of snout moth in the genus Hypsopygia. It was described by Aristide Caradja in 1932. It is found in China.
