= Hypsopygia maesalis =

Scientific classification
- Kingdom: Animalia
- Phylum: Arthropoda
- Clade: Pancrustacea
- Class: Insecta
- Order: Lepidoptera
- Family: Pyralidae
- Genus: Hypsopygia
- Species: H. maesalis

Binomial name
- Hypsopygia maesalis Leraut, 2006

Species of moth

Hypsopygia maesalis is a species of snout moth belonging to the genus Hypsopygia. This moth was described by Patrice J.A. Leraut in 2006 and is documented in Vietnam.
