= Hypsopygia caesalis =

Scientific classification
- Kingdom: Animalia
- Phylum: Arthropoda
- Clade: Pancrustacea
- Class: Insecta
- Order: Lepidoptera
- Family: Pyralidae
- Genus: Hypsopygia
- Species: H. caesalis

Binomial name
- Hypsopygia caesalis (Zeller, 1852)

Synonyms
- Asopia caesalis Zeller, 1852; Herculia caesalis

Species of moth

Hypsopygia caesalis is a species of snout moth in the genus Hypsopygia. It was described by Zeller in 1852. It is found in South Africa.
