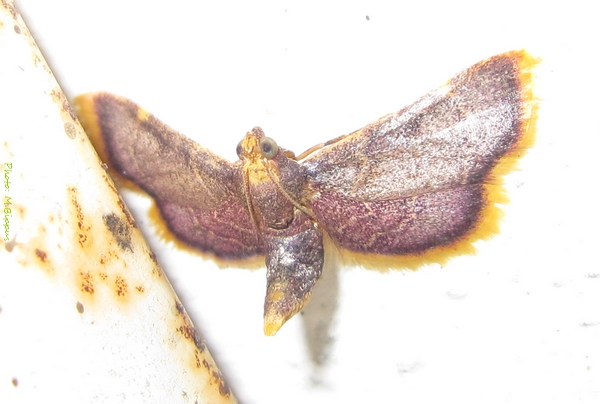

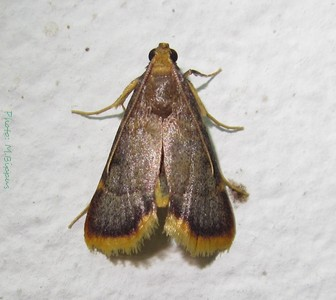

Scientific classification
- Kingdom: Animalia
- Phylum: Arthropoda
- Clade: Pancrustacea
- Class: Insecta
- Order: Lepidoptera
- Family: Pyralidae
- Genus: Hypsopygia
- Species: H. mauritialis

Binomial name
- Hypsopygia mauritialis (Boisduval, 1833)

Synonyms
- Asopia mauritialis Boisduval, 1833; Pyralis lucillalis Walker, 1859; Pyralis regalis Walker, 1865; Pyralis ducalis Walker, 1865; Hypsopygia laticilialis Ragonot, 1891; Hypsopygia maritialis; Paraglossa mauritialis; Endotricha crobulus Lucas, 1891; Hypsopygia atralis Caradja, 1932; Hypsopygia pfeifferi Amsel, 1954

= Hypsopygia mauritialis =

Species of moth

Hypsopygia mauritialis is a moth of the family Pyralidae described by Jean Baptiste Boisduval in 1833. It is a widespread species, known from Africa, India, China, Malaysia, Taiwan, Japan, Australia and Hawaii.

The wingspan is 16–21 mm.

The larvae feed in the old nests of Vespinae wasps, including Polistes species.
