= Hypsopygia kawabei =

Scientific classification
- Kingdom: Animalia
- Phylum: Arthropoda
- Clade: Pancrustacea
- Class: Insecta
- Order: Lepidoptera
- Family: Pyralidae
- Genus: Hypsopygia
- Species: H. kawabei

Binomial name
- Hypsopygia kawabei Yamanaka, 1965

Species of moth

Hypsopygia kawabei is a species of snout moth in the genus Hypsopygia. It was described by Hiroshi Yamanaka in 1965. It is found in Korea and Japan.

The wingspan is 16–20 mm. Adults are on wing from July to August.
