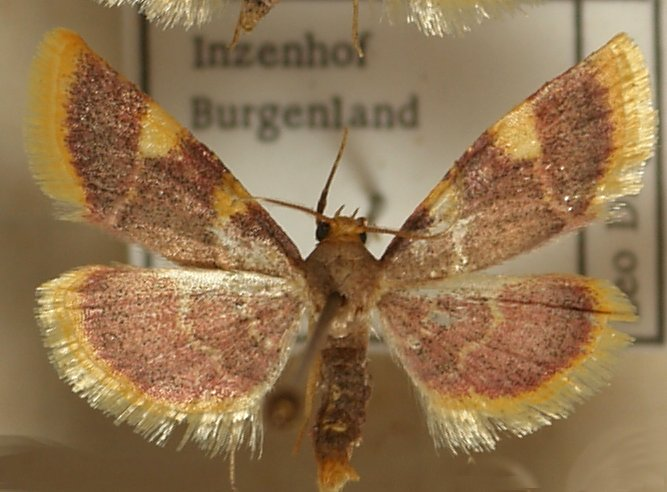
- Adult gold triangle (H. costalis)

Scientific classification
- Kingdom: Animalia
- Phylum: Arthropoda
- Clade: Pancrustacea
- Class: Insecta
- Order: Lepidoptera
- Family: Pyralidae
- Subfamily: Pyralinae
- Tribe: Pyralini
- Genus: Hypsopygia; Hübner, 1825

Synonyms
- Hypsopyga (lapsus); Pseudasopia Grote, 1873; Herculia Walker, 1859; Bejuda Walker, [1866]; Bleone Ragonot, 1890; Buzala Walker, 1863; Cisse Walker, 1863; Herculea (lapsus); Dolichomia Ragonot, 1891; Ocrasa Walker, [1866]; Orthopygia Ragonot, 1891; Parasopia Möschler, 1890

= Hypsopygia =

Genus of moths

Hypsopygia is a genus of moths belonging to the family Pyralidae. Though fairly small, they are large among their relatives. It was described by Jacob Hübner in 1825.

== Taxonomy ==
The genera Herculia, Dolichomia, Pseudasopia, Orthopygia and Ocrasa are mostly merged into Hypsopygia, although some authors still treat them as distinct genera.

== Species ==
Species include:

- Hypsopygia acerasta (Turner, 1904)
- Hypsopygia albidalis (Walker, 1866)
- Hypsopygia albilunalis (Caradja, 1927)
- Hypsopygia albolinealis (Hampson, 1891)
- Hypsopygia alluaudalis Leraut, 2006
- Hypsopygia almanalis (Rebel, 1917)
- Hypsopygia ambrensis Leraut, 2006
- Hypsopygia amoenalis (Möschler, 1882)
- Hypsopygia angulifascialis (Caradja, 1932)
- Hypsopygia audeoudi (de Joannis, 1927)
- Hypsopygia bamakoensis Leraut, 2006
- Hypsopygia biarealis (Caradja, 1925)
- Hypsopygia bilinealis (South, 1901)
- Hypsopygia binodulalis (Zeller, 1872)
- Hypsopygia bistonalis (Walker, 1859)
- Hypsopygia boudinoti Leraut, 2006
- Hypsopygia caesalis (Zeller, 1852)
- Hypsopygia camerounalis Leraut, 2006
- Hypsopygia castanealis (Shibuya, 1928)
- Hypsopygia castaneorufa (Hampson, 1917)
- Hypsopygia chytriodes (Turner, 1911)
- Hypsopygia cineralis (de Joannis, 1927)
- Hypsopygia cohortalis (Grote, 1878)
- Hypsopygia costaeguttalis Caradja, 1933
- Hypsopygia costalis (Fabricius, 1775) – gold triangle
- Hypsopygia craspedalis (Hampson, 1906)
- Hypsopygia datames (Druce, 1900)
- Hypsopygia decetialis (Druce, 1900)
- Hypsopygia decoloralis (Lederer, 1863)
- Hypsopygia dharmsalae (Butler, 1889)
- Hypsopygia drabicilialis (Yamanaka, 1968)
- Hypsopygia ecbrunnealis (Hampson, 1917)
- Hypsopygia ecrhodalis (Hampson, 1917)
- Hypsopygia flammealis (Hampson, 1906)
- Hypsopygia flavamaculata Shaffer, Nielsen & Horak, 1996 – formerly H. laticilialis Rothschild, 1916 (non Ragonot, 1916: preoccupied)
- Hypsopygia flavirufalis (Hampson, 1917)
- Hypsopygia fulvocilialis (Duponchel, 1834)
- Hypsopygia fuscalis (Hampson, 1891)
- Hypsopygia glaucinalis (Linnaeus, 1758)
- Hypsopygia graafialis (Snellen, 1975)
- Hypsopygia griseobrunnea (Hampson, 1917)
- Hypsopygia griveaudalis Leraut, 2006
- Hypsopygia haemograpta (Meyrick, 1934)
- Hypsopygia hoenei (Caradja, 1932)
- Hypsopygia ignefimbrialis (Hampson, 1906)
- Hypsopygia igniflualis (Walker, 1859)
- Hypsopygia impurpuratalis (Dognin, 1910)
- Hypsopygia incarnatalis (Zeller, 1847)
- Hypsopygia intermedialis (Walker, 1862)
- Hypsopygia iwamotoi Kirpichnikova & Yamanaka, 1995
- Hypsopygia jezoensis (Shibuya, 1928)
- Hypsopygia joannisalis Leraut, 2006
- Hypsopygia kawabei Yamanaka, 1965
- Hypsopygia lacteocilia (Hampson, 1917)
- Hypsopygia mabokealis Leraut, 2006
- Hypsopygia maesalis Leraut, 2006
- Hypsopygia marthalis (Walker, 1859)
- Hypsopygia mauritialis (Boisduval, 1833)
- Hypsopygia medialis (Hampson, 1903)
- Hypsopygia melanthalis (Walker, 1859)
- Hypsopygia meridocrossa (Meyrick, 1934)
- Hypsopygia metayei Leraut, 2006
- Hypsopygia moramangalis (Marion & Viette, 1956)
- Hypsopygia murzinalis Leraut, 2006
- Hypsopygia mus (Caradja, 1932)
- Hypsopygia nannodes (Butler, 1879)
- Hypsopygia nigrapuncta (Kaye, 1901)
- Hypsopygia nigrivitta (Walker, 1863)
- Hypsopygia nitidicilialis (Hering, 1901)
- Hypsopygia nonusalis (Walker, 1859)
- Hypsopygia nossibealis Leraut, 2006
- Hypsopygia nostralis (Guenée, 1854)
- Hypsopygia ochreicilia (Hampson, 1891)
- Hypsopygia olapalis Viette, 1978
- Hypsopygia olinalis (Guenée, 1854)
- Hypsopygia orthogramma (Inoue, 1960)
- Hypsopygia pelasgalis (Walker, 1859)
- Hypsopygia pernigralis (Ragonot, 1891)
- Hypsopygia perpulverea (Hampson, 1917)
- Hypsopygia phanerostola (Hampson, 1917)
- Hypsopygia phoezalis (Dyar, 1908)
- Hypsopygia placens (Butler, 1879)
- Hypsopygia planalis (Grote, 1880)
- Hypsopygia plumbeoprunalis (Hampson, 1917)
- Hypsopygia postflava (Hampson, 1893)
- Hypsopygia proboscidalis (Strand, 1919)
- Hypsopygia purpureorufa (Hampson, 1917 )
- Hypsopygia pyrerythra (Hampson, 1917)
- Hypsopygia racilialis (Walker, 1859)
- Hypsopygia regina (Butler, 1879)
- Hypsopygia repetita (Butler, 1887)
- Hypsopygia resectalis (Lederer, 1863)
- Hypsopygia roseotincta (Hampson, 1917)
- Hypsopygia rubidalis (Denis & Schiffermüller, 1775)
- Hypsopygia rudis (Moore, 1888)
- Hypsopygia sericea (Warren, 1891)
- Hypsopygia suffusalis (Walker, 1866)
- Hypsopygia superba Caradja, 1934
- Hypsopygia tabidalis (Warren 1891)
- Hypsopygia taiwanalis (Shibuya, 1928)
- Hypsopygia thyellodes (Meyrick, 1934)
- Hypsopygia thymetusalis (Walker, 1859)
- Hypsopygia tripartitalis (Herrich-Schäffer, 1871)
- Hypsopygia tristalis (Hampson, 1906)
- Hypsopygia vernaculalis (Berg, 1874)
- Hypsopygia violaceomarginalis (Caradja, 1935)
- Hypsopygia vulgaris (Ghesquière, 1942)
