= Etielloides kogii =

Scientific classification
- Kingdom: Animalia
- Phylum: Arthropoda
- Class: Insecta
- Order: Lepidoptera
- Family: Pyralidae
- Genus: Etielloides
- Species: E. kogii

Binomial name
- Etielloides kogii Yamanaka, 1998

Species of moth

Etielloides kogii is a species of snout moth in the genus Etielloides. It was described by Hiroshi Yamanaka in 1998 and is known from China and Japan.
