= Hypsopygia audeoudi =

Scientific classification
- Kingdom: Animalia
- Phylum: Arthropoda
- Clade: Pancrustacea
- Class: Insecta
- Order: Lepidoptera
- Family: Pyralidae
- Genus: Hypsopygia
- Species: H. audeoudi

Binomial name
- Hypsopygia audeoudi (de Joannis, 1927)

Synonyms
- Tegulifera audeoudi de Joannis, 1927

Species of moth

Hypsopygia audeoudi is a species of snout moth in the genus Hypsopygia. It was described by Joseph de Joannis in 1927 and is known from Mozambique.
