= Hypsopygia olapalis =

Scientific classification
- Kingdom: Animalia
- Phylum: Arthropoda
- Clade: Pancrustacea
- Class: Insecta
- Order: Lepidoptera
- Family: Pyralidae
- Genus: Hypsopygia
- Species: H. olapalis

Binomial name
- Hypsopygia olapalis Viette, 1978

Species of moth

Hypsopygia olapalis is a species of snout moth in the genus Hypsopygia. It was described by Viette in 1978, and is known from Madagascar.
