= Hypsopygia rubidalis =

Scientific classification
- Kingdom: Animalia
- Phylum: Arthropoda
- Clade: Pancrustacea
- Class: Insecta
- Order: Lepidoptera
- Family: Pyralidae
- Genus: Hypsopygia
- Species: H. rubidalis

Binomial name
- Hypsopygia rubidalis (Denis & Schiffermüller, 1775)

Synonyms
- Pyralis rubidalis Denis & Schiffermüller, 1775; Herculia rubidalis; Pyralis lucidalis Hübner, 1813

Species of moth

Hypsopygia rubidalis is a species of snout moth in the genus Hypsopygia. It was described by Michael Denis and Ignaz Schiffermüller in 1775. It is found from Spain and France to Russia.

The wingspan is about 25 mm.
