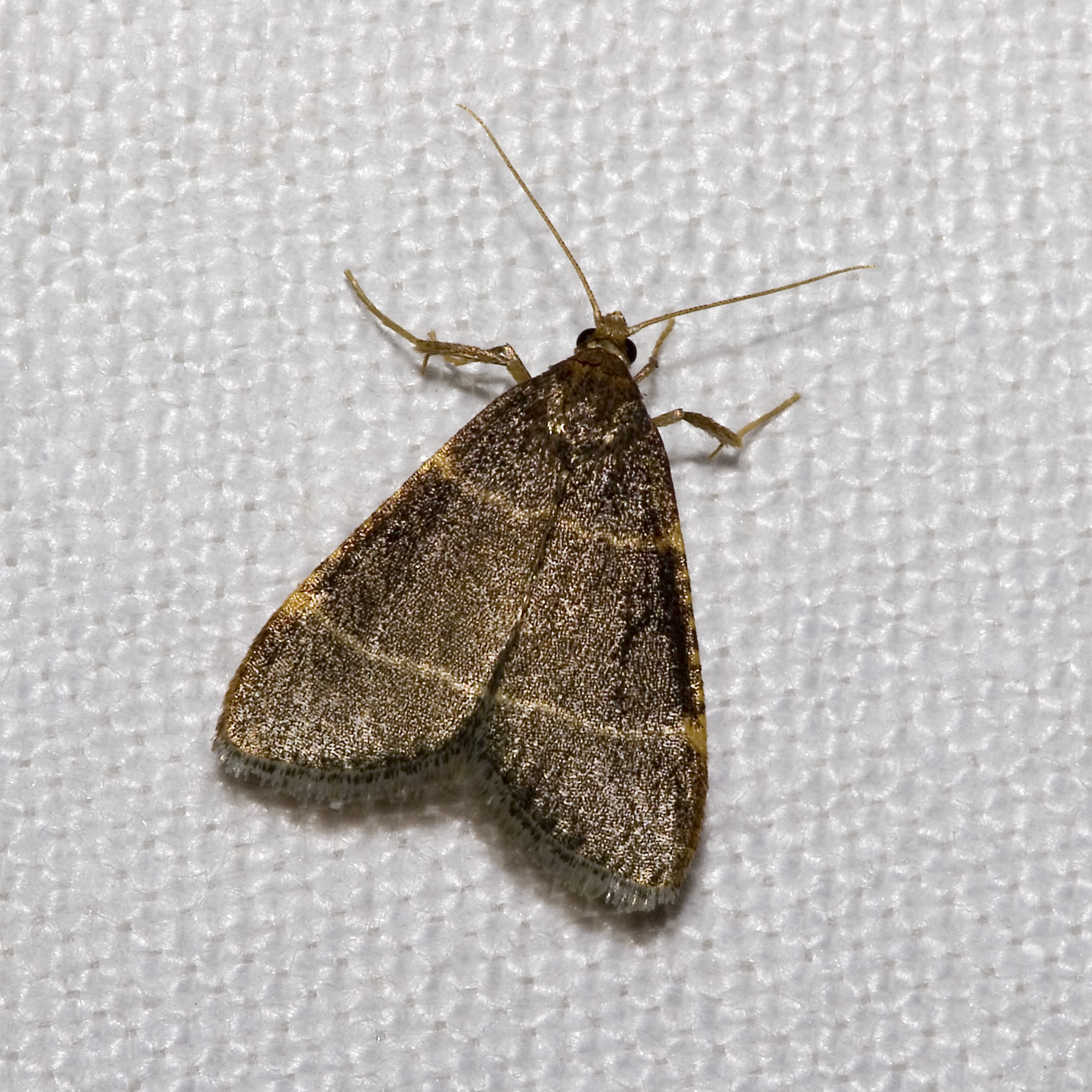
- Adult in Dresden (Saxony, Germany)
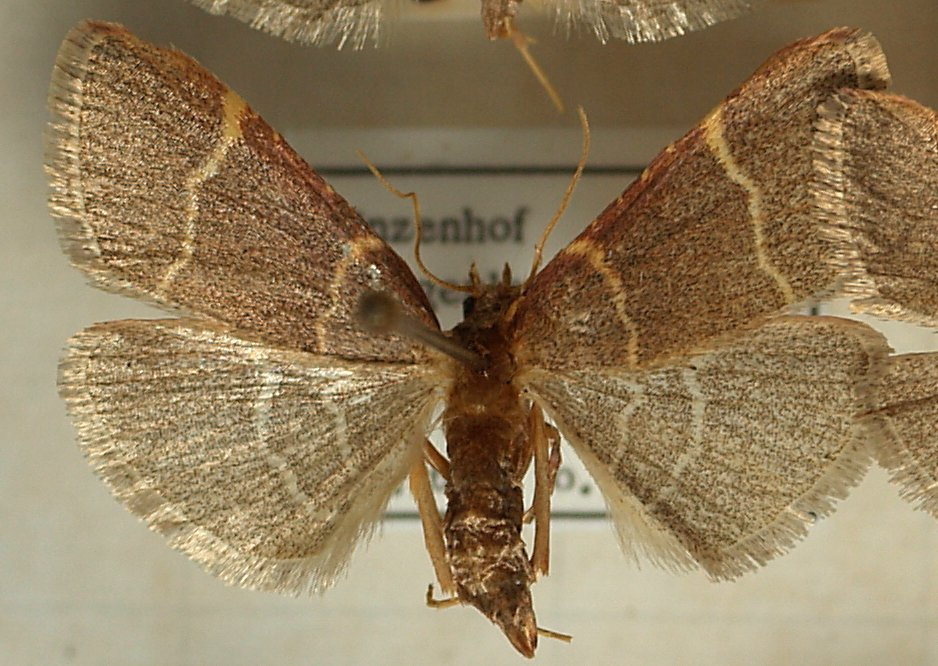
- Mounted adult

Scientific classification
- Kingdom: Animalia
- Phylum: Arthropoda
- Clade: Pancrustacea
- Class: Insecta
- Order: Lepidoptera
- Family: Pyralidae
- Genus: Hypsopygia
- Species: H. glaucinalis

Binomial name
- Hypsopygia glaucinalis (Linnaeus, 1758)

Synonyms
- Phalaena (Pyralis) glaucinalis Linnaeus, 1758; Ocrasa glaucinalis; Herculia glaucinalis; Orthopygia glaucinalis; Herculia nigralis Evers, 1958; Pyralis nitidalis Fabricius, 1794; Pyralis yokohamae Butler, 1879

= Hypsopygia glaucinalis =

Species of moth

Hypsopygia glaucinalis is a moth of the family Pyralidae. It is sometimes placed in the genus Orthopygia either alone or with a few other species. Being the type species of Orthopygia, as soon as O. glaucinalis is placed in Ocrasa (as is done here) "Orthopygia" is abolished. To further complicate matters, Ocrasa is now mostly treated as a synonym or subgenus of Hypsopygia.

It is native to the European continent.

The wingspan is 23–31 mm. The forewings are brownish-grey, on costa purplish; median part of costa dotted with yellow; lines pale ochreous, nearly straight, stronger and yellower on costa. Hindwings grey; two fine whitish approximated lines, first twice sub angulated, second curved.The larva is blackish-green, lighter laterally; head and plate of 2 lighter: in silken galleries amongst decaying leaves and twigs of birch.

The adults fly from June to October in the temperate parts of its range (such as Belgium and the Netherlands).

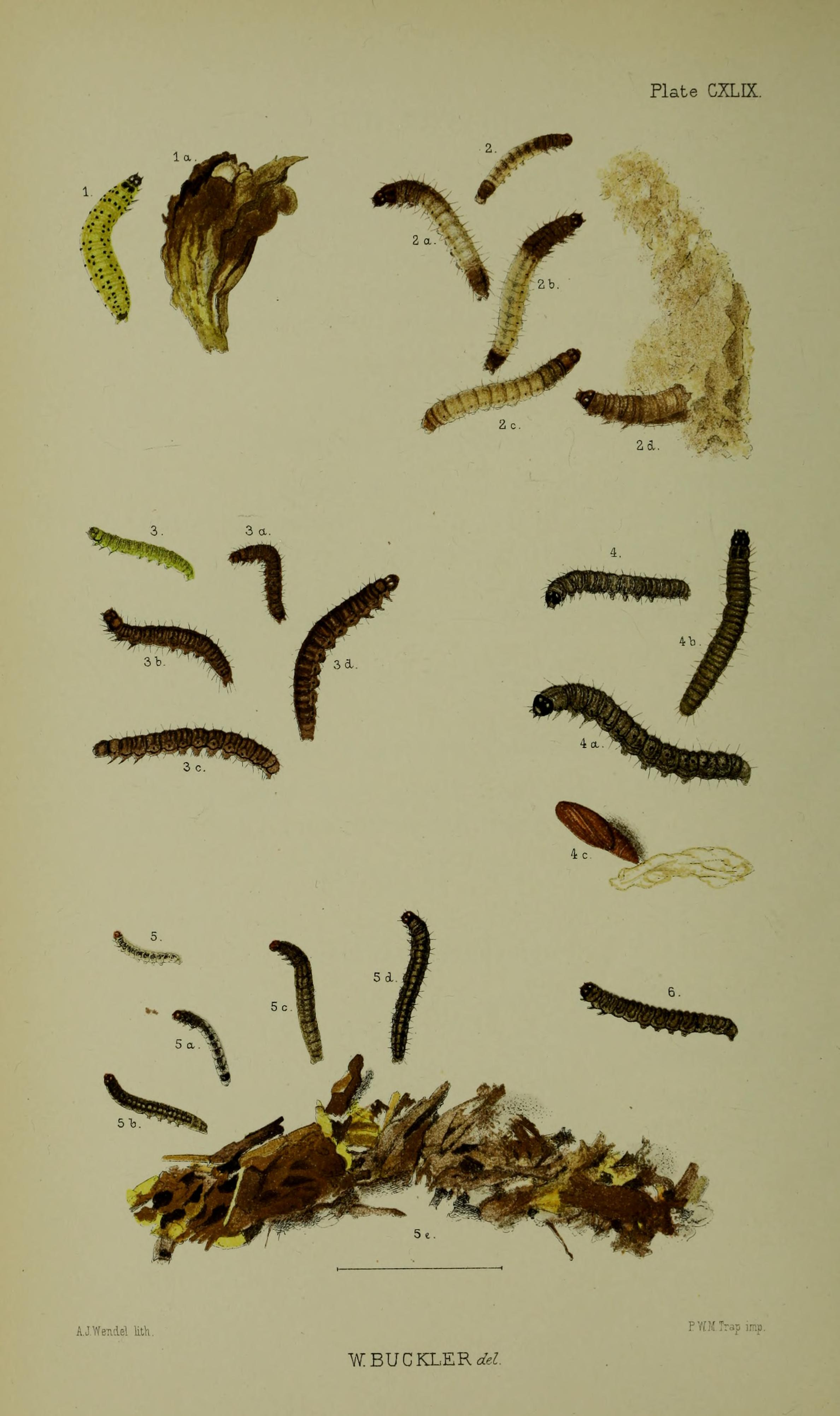
Figs 3. 3a, 3b, 3c, 3d larvae in various stages in accumulations of twigs and rubbish at knots of birch

The caterpillars feed on decaying plants and dry leaves. They have been found in some fairly unusual locations, such as Buteo nests, straw and thatching, and discarded paper.
