= Hypsopygia biarealis =

Scientific classification
- Kingdom: Animalia
- Phylum: Arthropoda
- Clade: Pancrustacea
- Class: Insecta
- Order: Lepidoptera
- Family: Pyralidae
- Genus: Hypsopygia
- Species: H. biarealis

Binomial name
- Hypsopygia biarealis (Caradja, 1925)

Synonyms
- Herculia biarealis Caradja, 1925

Species of moth

Hypsopygia biarealis is a species of snout moth in the genus Hypsopygia. It was described by Aristide Caradja in 1925. It is found in China.
