= Hypsopygia pyrerythra =

Scientific classification
- Kingdom: Animalia
- Phylum: Arthropoda
- Clade: Pancrustacea
- Class: Insecta
- Order: Lepidoptera
- Family: Pyralidae
- Genus: Hypsopygia
- Species: H. pyrerythra

Binomial name
- Hypsopygia pyrerythra (Hampson, 1917)

Synonyms
- Herculia pyrerythra Hampson, 1917; Herculia rubrica Ghesquière, 1942

Species of moth

Hypsopygia pyrerythra is a species of snout moth in the genus Hypsopygia. It was described by George Hampson in 1917. It is found in Nigeria and the Democratic Republic of the Congo.
