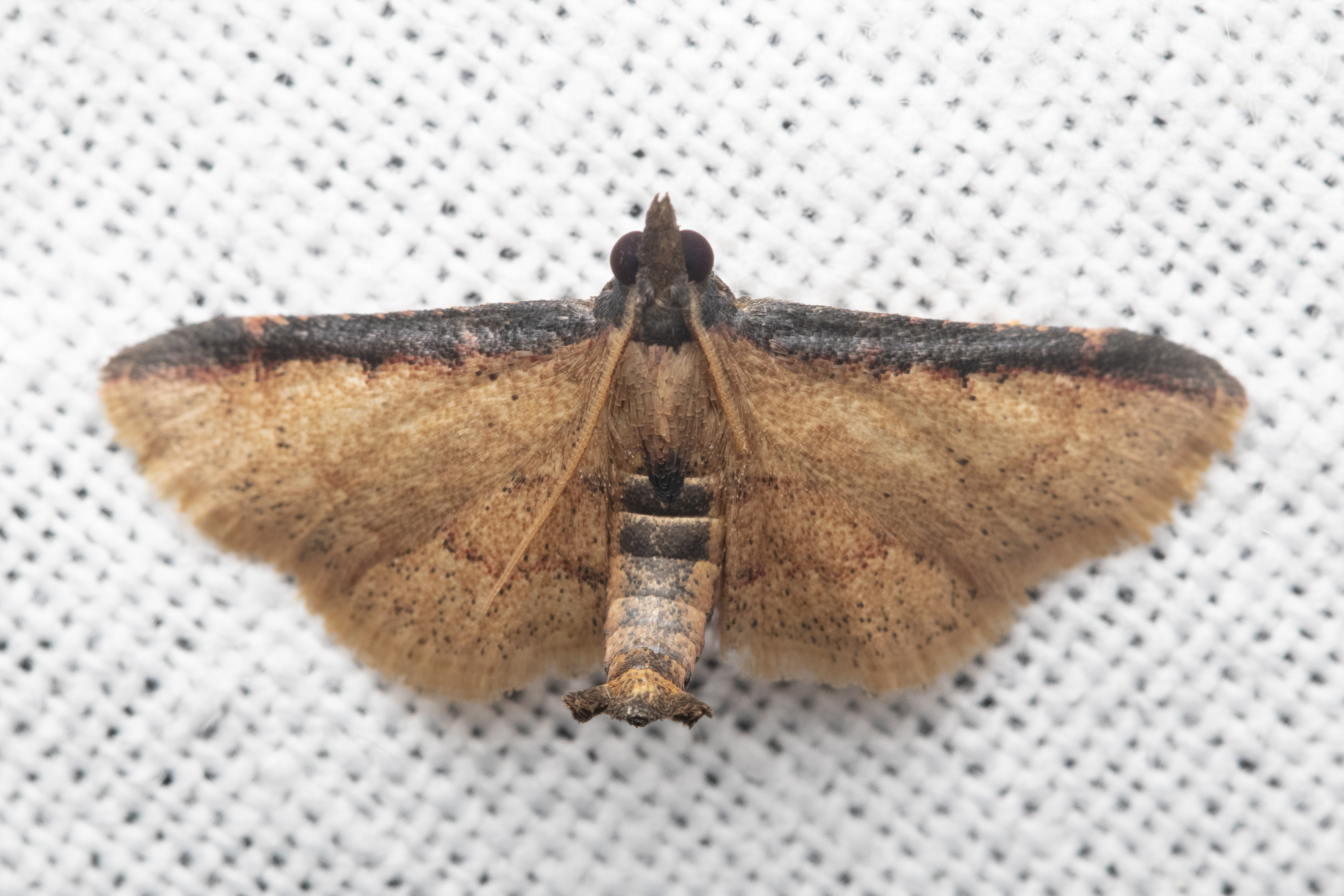

Scientific classification
- Kingdom: Animalia
- Phylum: Arthropoda
- Clade: Pancrustacea
- Class: Insecta
- Order: Lepidoptera
- Family: Pyralidae
- Genus: Hypsopygia
- Species: H. nigrivitta

Binomial name
- Hypsopygia nigrivitta (Walker, 1863)

Synonyms
- Cisse nigrivitta Walker, 1863; Herculia nigrivitta; Buzala fuscicosta Walker, 1863; Bejuda costigeralis Walker, [1866]; Asopia fuscicostalis Snellen, 1880; Paractenia obstans Meyrick, 1936

= Hypsopygia nigrivitta =

Species of moth

Hypsopygia nigrivitta is a species of snout moth in the genus Hypsopygia. It was described by Francis Walker in 1863. It is found in Australia and south-east Asia, including Borneo, Sulawesi, Java and Malaysia.

The larvae are considered a nuisance since they have the habit of spinning a silken burrow beneath and between two pieces of thatch to which it retreats when not feeding. Usually each thatch strip is occupied by a single larva. As the infested thatch deteriorates with much damage from feeding, a new piece of thatch has to be inserted from time to time.
