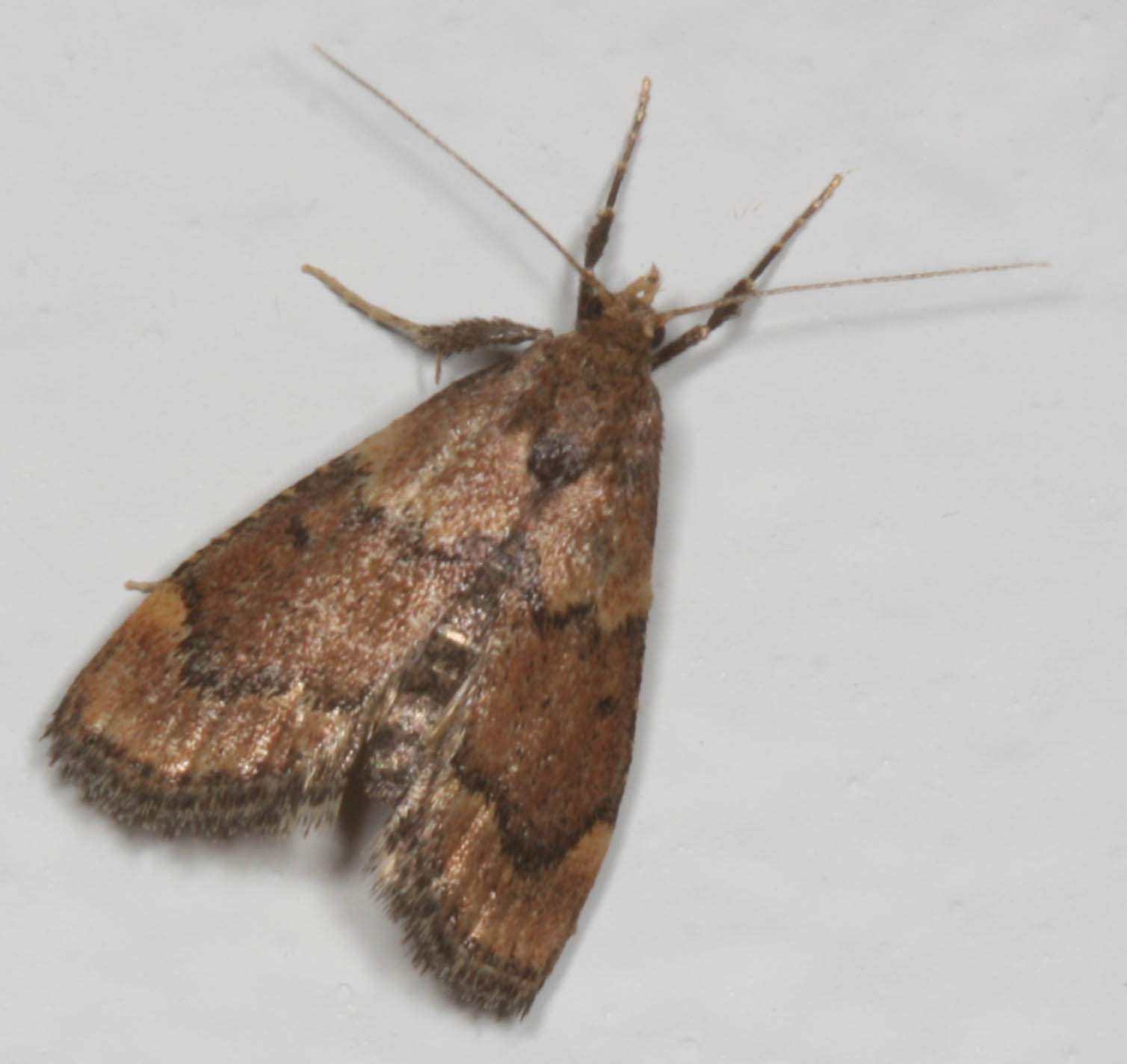

Scientific classification
- Kingdom: Animalia
- Phylum: Arthropoda
- Clade: Pancrustacea
- Class: Insecta
- Order: Lepidoptera
- Family: Pyralidae
- Genus: Hypsopygia
- Species: H. phoezalis

Binomial name
- Hypsopygia phoezalis (Dyar, 1908)

Synonyms
- Herculia phoezalis Dyar, 1908; Pseudasopia phoezalis; Herculia phoezalia

= Hypsopygia phoezalis =

Species of insect

Hypsopygia phoezalis is a species of snout moth in the genus Hypsopygia. It is found near Los Angeles and Catalina Island in California.

The length of the forewings is 7.5–12 mm. Adults are on wing from April to early October.
