= Hypsopygia racilialis =

Scientific classification
- Kingdom: Animalia
- Phylum: Arthropoda
- Clade: Pancrustacea
- Class: Insecta
- Order: Lepidoptera
- Family: Pyralidae
- Genus: Hypsopygia
- Species: H. racilialis

Binomial name
- Hypsopygia racilialis (Walker, 1859)

Synonyms
- Pyralis racilialis Walker, 1859

Species of moth

Hypsopygia racilialis is a species of snout moth in the genus Hypsopygia. It was described by Francis Walker in 1859 and is known from northern China.
