= Hypsopygia costaeguttalis =

Scientific classification
- Kingdom: Animalia
- Phylum: Arthropoda
- Clade: Pancrustacea
- Class: Insecta
- Order: Lepidoptera
- Family: Pyralidae
- Genus: Hypsopygia
- Species: H. costaeguttalis

Binomial name
- Hypsopygia costaeguttalis Caradja, 1933

Species of moth

Hypsopygia costaeguttalis is a species of snout moth in the genus Hypsopygia. It was described by Aristide Caradja in 1933. It is found in China.
