= Hypsopygia nitidicilialis =

Scientific classification
- Kingdom: Animalia
- Phylum: Arthropoda
- Clade: Pancrustacea
- Class: Insecta
- Order: Lepidoptera
- Family: Pyralidae
- Genus: Hypsopygia
- Species: H. nitidicilialis

Binomial name
- Hypsopygia nitidicilialis (Hering, 1901)

Synonyms
- Herculia nitidicilialis Hering, 1901; Orthopygia nitidicilialis

Species of moth

Hypsopygia nitidicilialis is a species of snout moth in the genus Hypsopygia. It was described by Hering in 1901. It is found on Sumatra.
