= Hypsopygia fuscalis =

Scientific classification
- Kingdom: Animalia
- Phylum: Arthropoda
- Clade: Pancrustacea
- Class: Insecta
- Order: Lepidoptera
- Family: Pyralidae
- Genus: Hypsopygia
- Species: H. fuscalis

Binomial name
- Hypsopygia fuscalis (Hampson, 1891)

Synonyms
- Actenioides fuscalis Hampson, 1891; Herculia fuscalis; Stemmatophora aedalis Hampson, 1912

Species of moth

Hypsopygia fuscalis is a species of snout moth in the genus Hypsopygia. It was described by George Hampson in 1891. It is found in India.
