= Hypsopygia pernigralis =

Scientific classification
- Kingdom: Animalia
- Phylum: Arthropoda
- Clade: Pancrustacea
- Class: Insecta
- Order: Lepidoptera
- Family: Pyralidae
- Genus: Hypsopygia
- Species: H. pernigralis

Binomial name
- Hypsopygia pernigralis (Ragonot, 1891)

Synonyms
- Orthopygia pernigralis Ragonot, 1891; Herculia pernigralis; Herculia aurocilialis Hampson, 1891

Species of moth

Hypsopygia pernigralis is a species of snout moth in the genus Hypsopygia. It was described by Ragonot in 1891, and is known from China and India.
