= Hypsopygia joannisalis =

Scientific classification
- Kingdom: Animalia
- Phylum: Arthropoda
- Clade: Pancrustacea
- Class: Insecta
- Order: Lepidoptera
- Family: Pyralidae
- Genus: Hypsopygia
- Species: H. joannisalis

Binomial name
- Hypsopygia joannisalis Leraut, 2006

Species of moth

Hypsopygia joannisalis is a species of snout moth in the genus Hypsopygia described by Patrice J.A. Leraut in 2006. It is found in Ivory Coast.
