= Hypsopygia marthalis =

Scientific classification
- Kingdom: Animalia
- Phylum: Arthropoda
- Clade: Pancrustacea
- Class: Insecta
- Order: Lepidoptera
- Family: Pyralidae
- Genus: Hypsopygia
- Species: H. marthalis

Binomial name
- Hypsopygia marthalis (Walker, 1859)

Synonyms
- Pyralis marthalis Walker, 1859; Herculia marthalis; Herculia bractealis Walker, 1859

Species of moth

Hypsopygia marthalis is a species of snout moth in the genus Hypsopygia. It is found in western Malaysia, Sumatra, Borneo and Sri Lanka.
