= Hypsopygia cineralis =

Scientific classification
- Kingdom: Animalia
- Phylum: Arthropoda
- Clade: Pancrustacea
- Class: Insecta
- Order: Lepidoptera
- Family: Pyralidae
- Genus: Hypsopygia
- Species: H. cineralis

Binomial name
- Hypsopygia cineralis (de Joannis, 1927)

Synonyms
- Herculia cineralis

Species of moth

Hypsopygia cineralis is a species of snout moth in the genus Hypsopygia. It was described by Joseph de Joannis in 1927 and is known from Mozambique.
