= Hypsopygia haemograpta =

Scientific classification
- Kingdom: Animalia
- Phylum: Arthropoda
- Clade: Pancrustacea
- Class: Insecta
- Order: Lepidoptera
- Family: Pyralidae
- Genus: Hypsopygia
- Species: H. haemograpta

Binomial name
- Hypsopygia haemograpta (Meyrick, 1934)

Synonyms
- Herculia haemograpta Meyrick, 1934; Herculia haemograpta ab. pyrrholepidis Ghesquière, 1942

Species of moth

Hypsopygia haemograpta is a species of snout moth in the genus Hypsopygia. It was described by Edward Meyrick in 1934. It is found in the Democratic Republic of the Congo.
