= Etielloides longipalpus =

Scientific classification
- Kingdom: Animalia
- Phylum: Arthropoda
- Class: Insecta
- Order: Lepidoptera
- Family: Pyralidae
- Genus: Etielloides
- Species: E. longipalpus

Binomial name
- Etielloides longipalpus Ren & Li, 2006

Species of moth

Etielloides longipalpus is a species of snout moth in the genus Etielloides. It was described by Ying-Dang Ren and Hou-Hun Li in 2006 and is known from China.
