= Hypsopygia tabidalis =

Scientific classification
- Kingdom: Animalia
- Phylum: Arthropoda
- Clade: Pancrustacea
- Class: Insecta
- Order: Lepidoptera
- Family: Pyralidae
- Genus: Hypsopygia
- Species: H. tabidalis

Binomial name
- Hypsopygia tabidalis (Warren 1891)

Synonyms
- Pyralis tabidalis Warren, 1891; Herculia tabidalis

Species of moth

Hypsopygia tabidalis is a species of snout moth in the genus Hypsopygia. It was described by Warren in 1891. It is found in Peru.
