= Hypsopygia dharmsalae =

Scientific classification
- Kingdom: Animalia
- Phylum: Arthropoda
- Clade: Pancrustacea
- Class: Insecta
- Order: Lepidoptera
- Family: Pyralidae
- Genus: Hypsopygia
- Species: H. dharmsalae

Binomial name
- Hypsopygia dharmsalae (Butler, 1889)

Synonyms
- Euelita dharmsalae Butler, 1889; Herculia dharmsalae

Species of moth

Hypsopygia dharmsalae is a species of snout moth in the genus Hypsopygia. It was described by Arthur Gardiner Butler in 1889. It is found in India.
