= Homoeosoma matsumurella =

Scientific classification
- Kingdom: Animalia
- Phylum: Arthropoda
- Clade: Pancrustacea
- Class: Insecta
- Order: Lepidoptera
- Family: Pyralidae
- Genus: Homoeosoma
- Species: H. matsumurella

Binomial name
- Homoeosoma matsumurella Shibuya, 1927

Synonyms
- Homoeosoma heidiellum Roesler, 1967; Homoeosoma heidiella

Species of moth

Homoeosoma matsumurella is a species of snout moth in the genus Homoeosoma. It was described by Shibuya in 1927, and is known from Japan and Russia.

The wingspan is about 24 mm. The forewings are testaceous mixed with fuscous, especially on the costal area. The hindwings are whitish, tinged with pale brown except in the basal and inner areas.
