= Hypsopygia griseobrunnea =

Scientific classification
- Kingdom: Animalia
- Phylum: Arthropoda
- Clade: Pancrustacea
- Class: Insecta
- Order: Lepidoptera
- Family: Pyralidae
- Genus: Hypsopygia
- Species: H. griseobrunnea

Binomial name
- Hypsopygia griseobrunnea (Hampson, 1917)

Synonyms
- Herculia griseobrunnea Hampson, 1917

Species of moth

Hypsopygia griseobrunnea is a species of snout moth in the genus Hypsopygia. It was described by George Hampson in 1917. It is found in South Africa.
