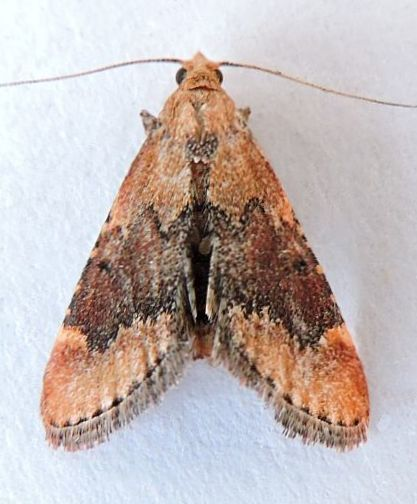

Scientific classification
- Kingdom: Animalia
- Phylum: Arthropoda
- Clade: Pancrustacea
- Class: Insecta
- Order: Lepidoptera
- Family: Pyralidae
- Genus: Hypsopygia
- Species: H. cohortalis

Binomial name
- Hypsopygia cohortalis (Grote, 1878)

Synonyms
- Asopia cohortalis Grote, 1878; Pseudasopia cohortalis; Herculia florencealis Blackmore, 1920

= Hypsopygia cohortalis =

Species of moth

Hypsopygia cohortalis is a species of snout moth in the genus Hypsopygia. It is found in North America, including Colorado, Arizona, California, New Mexico and Ohio.
