= Hypsopygia incarnatalis =

Scientific classification
- Kingdom: Animalia
- Phylum: Arthropoda
- Clade: Pancrustacea
- Class: Insecta
- Order: Lepidoptera
- Family: Pyralidae
- Genus: Hypsopygia
- Species: H. incarnatalis

Binomial name
- Hypsopygia incarnatalis (Zeller, 1847)

Synonyms
- Asopia incarnatalis Zeller, 1847; Herculia incarnatalis

Species of moth

Hypsopygia incarnatalis is a species of snout moth in the genus Hypsopygia. It was described by Zeller in 1847. It is found in Spain, Portugal, France, Italy, Croatia, Hungary, Romania and Greece.
