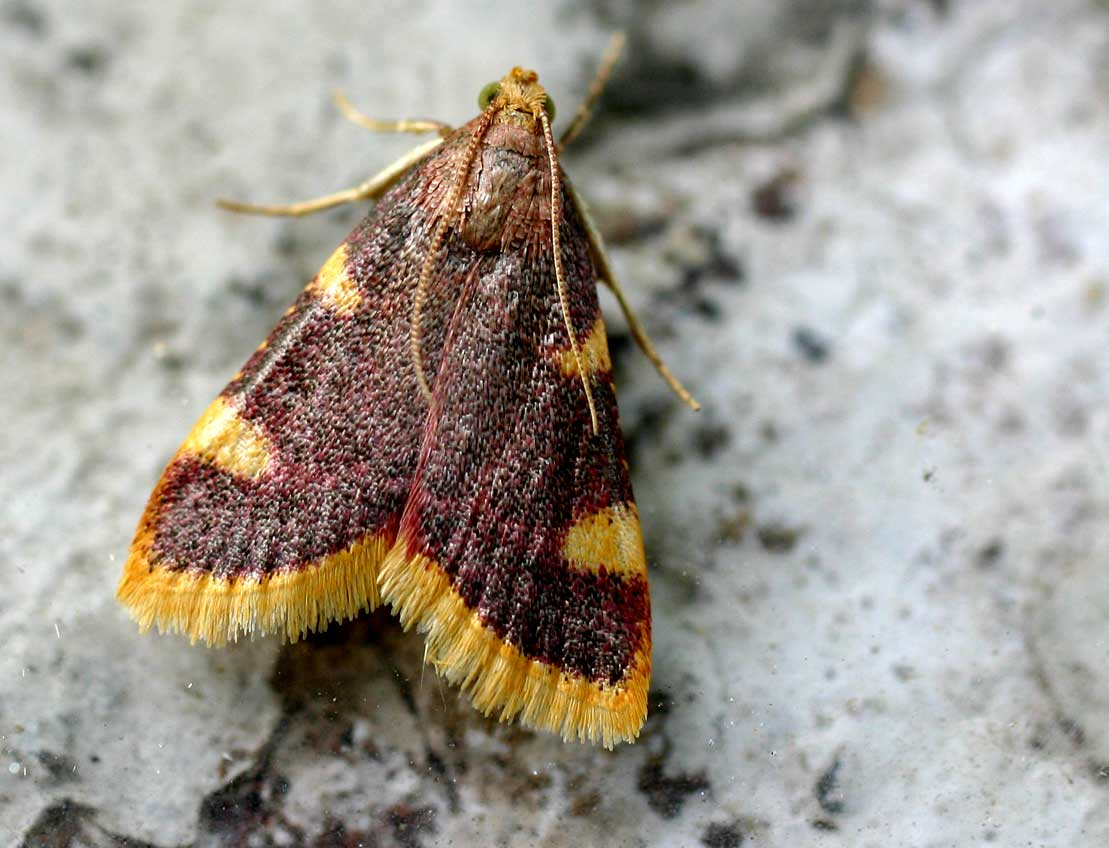

Scientific classification
- Kingdom: Animalia
- Phylum: Arthropoda
- Clade: Pancrustacea
- Class: Insecta
- Order: Lepidoptera
- Family: Pyralidae
- Genus: Hypsopygia
- Species: H. costalis

Binomial name
- Hypsopygia costalis (Fabricius, 1775)

Synonyms
- Numerous, see text

= Hypsopygia costalis =

Species of moth

Hypsopygia costalis, the gold triangle or clover hay moth, is a species of moth of the family Pyralidae. It was described by Johan Christian Fabricius in 1775 and is found in Europe.

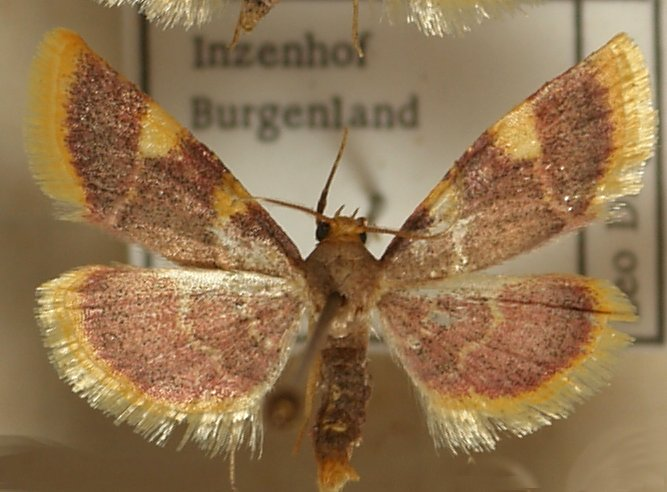

The wingspan is 16–23 mm.The forewings are purple, sometimes blackish-sprinkled; median part of costa dotted with yellow; lines yellow, nearly straight, forming large spots on costa; a terminal line and cilia yellow. Hindwings as forewings, but lines much nearer together, irregularly curved, not forming costal spots.

The adult moths fly from May to July, depending on the location. The supposed species H. aurotaenialis is included here pending further study.

The caterpillars feed on dry vegetable matter. They have been found in haystacks or thatching, as well as in chicken (Gallus) and magpie (Pica) nests. The caterpillar is injurious to clover hay, and to other hay when mixed with clover. Its depredations can be prevented by keeping the hay dry and well ventilated, as the insect preferably breeds in moist or matted material such as is to be found in the lower parts of haystacks, where affected hay becomes filled with webbings of the caterpillars and their excrement, rendering it unfit for feeding. A treatment is to burn the webbed material and to thoroughly clean the affected location.

== Synonyms ==
Junior synonyms of this species are:

- Hypsopygia aurotaenialis (Christoph, 1881) (but see above)
- Hypsopygia rubrocilialis (Staudinger, 1870)
- Phalaena costalis Fabricius, 1775
- Pyralis fimbrialis Denis & Schiffermüller, 1775
- Pyralis hyllalis Walker, 1859
- Tortrix purpurana Thunberg, 1784
- Pyralis costalis
- Hypsopygia syriaca Zerny, 1914
- Pyralis unipunctalis Mathew, 1914
- Pyralis ustocilialis Fuchs, 1903
