= Hypsopygia bilinealis =

Scientific classification
- Kingdom: Animalia
- Phylum: Arthropoda
- Clade: Pancrustacea
- Class: Insecta
- Order: Lepidoptera
- Family: Pyralidae
- Genus: Hypsopygia
- Species: H. bilinealis

Binomial name
- Hypsopygia bilinealis (South, 1901)

Synonyms
- Herculia bilinealis South, 1901; Herculia ahyoui Caradja, 1935

Species of moth

Hypsopygia bilinealis is a species of snout moth in the genus Hypsopygia. It was described by South in 1901. It is found in China.
