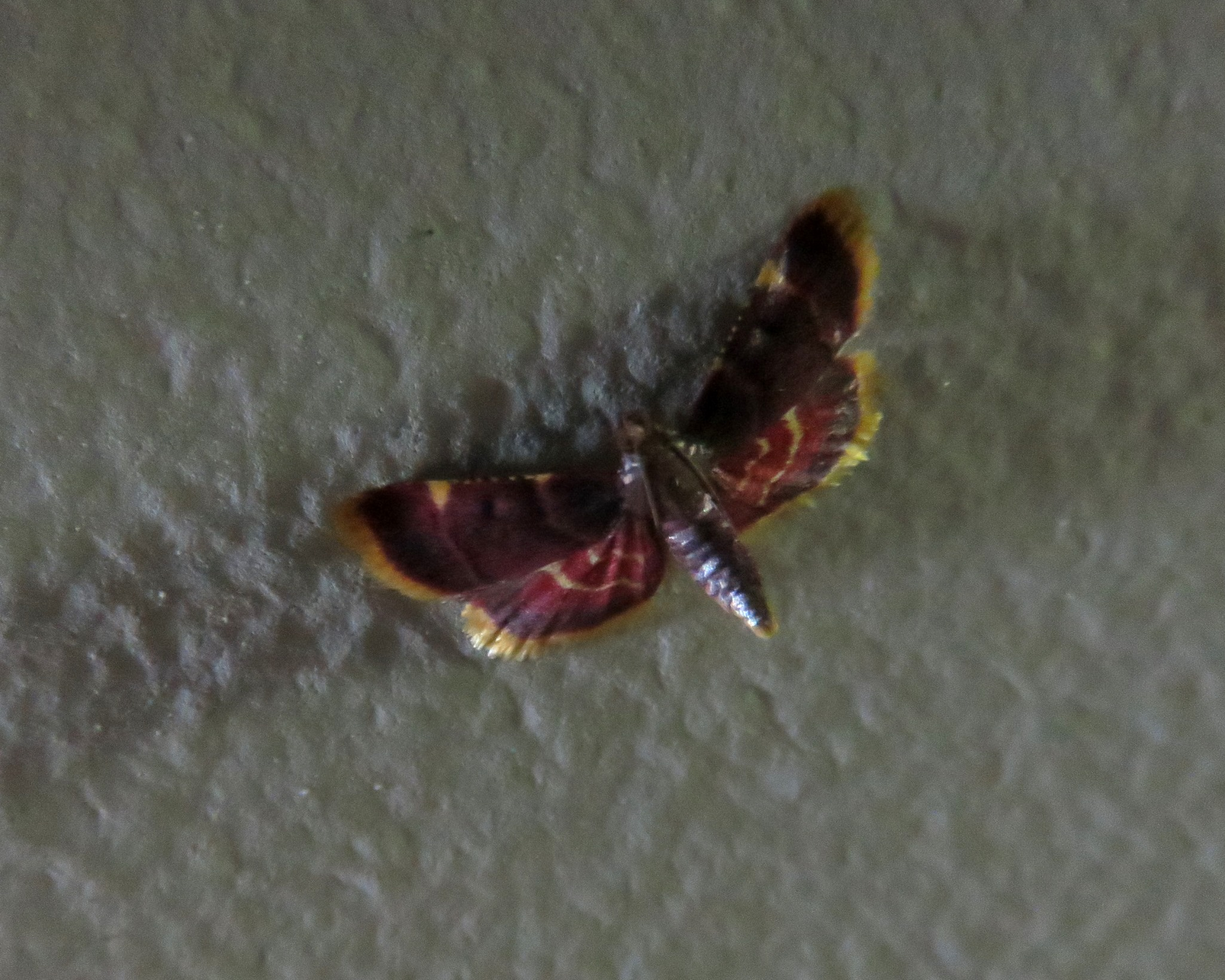

Scientific classification
- Kingdom: Animalia
- Phylum: Arthropoda
- Clade: Pancrustacea
- Class: Insecta
- Order: Lepidoptera
- Family: Pyralidae
- Genus: Hypsopygia
- Species: H. regina

Binomial name
- Hypsopygia regina (Butler, 1879)

Synonyms
- Pyralis regina Butler, 1879

= Hypsopygia regina =

Species of moth

Hypsopygia regina is a species of snout moth, family Pyralidae. It was described by Arthur Gardiner Butler in 1879. It is known from Korea, Japan, Myanmar, India, China, and Russian Far East.

Adults are on wing from June to August.
