= Hypsopygia igniflualis =

Scientific classification
- Kingdom: Animalia
- Phylum: Arthropoda
- Clade: Pancrustacea
- Class: Insecta
- Order: Lepidoptera
- Family: Pyralidae
- Genus: Hypsopygia
- Species: H. igniflualis

Binomial name
- Hypsopygia igniflualis (Walker, 1859)

Synonyms
- Pyralis igniflualis Walker, 1859; Orthopygia igniflualis; Orthopygia glauculalis Yamanaka, 1980; Pyralis dorcasalis Walker, 1859; Pyralis healealis Walker, 1859

Species of moth

Hypsopygia igniflualis is a species of snout moth in the genus Hypsopygia. It was described by Francis Walker in 1859. It is found in Asia, including Borneo, Sri Lanka, China and Japan.
