= Hypsopygia amoenalis =

Scientific classification
- Kingdom: Animalia
- Phylum: Arthropoda
- Clade: Pancrustacea
- Class: Insecta
- Order: Lepidoptera
- Family: Pyralidae
- Genus: Hypsopygia
- Species: H. amoenalis

Binomial name
- Hypsopygia amoenalis (Möschler, 1882)

Synonyms
- Asopia amoenalis Möschler, 1882; Dolichomia amoenalis; Pyralis isidora Meyrick, 1938

Species of moth

Hypsopygia amoenalis is a species of snout moth in the genus Hypsopygia. It was described by Heinrich Benno Möschler in 1882. It is found in Suriname and Venezuela.
