= Hypsopygia tripartitalis =

Scientific classification
- Kingdom: Animalia
- Phylum: Arthropoda
- Clade: Pancrustacea
- Class: Insecta
- Order: Lepidoptera
- Family: Pyralidae
- Genus: Hypsopygia
- Species: H. tripartitalis

Binomial name
- Hypsopygia tripartitalis (Herrich-Schäffer, 1871)

Synonyms
- Hypsopygia tripartialis; Asopia tripartitalis Herrich-Schäffer, 1871; Ocrasa tripartitalis

Species of moth

Hypsopygia tripartitalis is a species of snout moth in the genus Hypsopygia. It is found in Cuba.
