= Hypsopygia vernaculalis =

Scientific classification
- Kingdom: Animalia
- Phylum: Arthropoda
- Clade: Pancrustacea
- Class: Insecta
- Order: Lepidoptera
- Family: Pyralidae
- Genus: Hypsopygia
- Species: H. vernaculalis

Binomial name
- Hypsopygia vernaculalis (Berg, 1874)

Synonyms
- Asopia vernaculalis Berg, 1874; Dolichomia vernaculalis

Species of moth

Hypsopygia vernaculalis is a species of snout moth in the genus Hypsopygia. It was described by Carlos Berg in 1874 and is found in Argentina.
