= Hypsopygia decetialis =

Scientific classification
- Kingdom: Animalia
- Phylum: Arthropoda
- Clade: Pancrustacea
- Class: Insecta
- Order: Lepidoptera
- Family: Pyralidae
- Genus: Hypsopygia
- Species: H. decetialis

Binomial name
- Hypsopygia decetialis (H. Druce, 1900)

Synonyms
- Pyralis decetialis H. Druce, 1900; Dolichomia decetialis

Species of moth

Hypsopygia decetialis is a species of snout moth in the genus Hypsopygia. It was described by Herbert Druce in 1900. It is found in Mexico.
