= Hypsopygia chytriodes =

Scientific classification
- Kingdom: Animalia
- Phylum: Arthropoda
- Clade: Pancrustacea
- Class: Insecta
- Order: Lepidoptera
- Family: Pyralidae
- Genus: Hypsopygia
- Species: H. chytriodes

Binomial name
- Hypsopygia chytriodes (Turner, 1911)

Synonyms
- Herculia chytriodes Turner, 1911; Ocrasa chytriodes

Species of moth

Hypsopygia chytriodes is a species of snout moth in the genus Hypsopygia. It was described by Alfred Jefferis Turner in 1911 and is found in Australia.
