= Hypsopygia placens =

Scientific classification
- Kingdom: Animalia
- Phylum: Arthropoda
- Clade: Pancrustacea
- Class: Insecta
- Order: Lepidoptera
- Family: Pyralidae
- Genus: Hypsopygia
- Species: H. placens

Binomial name
- Hypsopygia placens (Butler, 1879)

Synonyms
- Rhodaria placens Butler, 1879; Ocrasa placens; Orthopygia placens

Species of moth

Hypsopygia placens is a species of snout moth in the genus Hypsopygia. It is found in Japan, Korea, China and Russia.

The wingspan is 23–26 mm. Adults are on wing from July to August.
