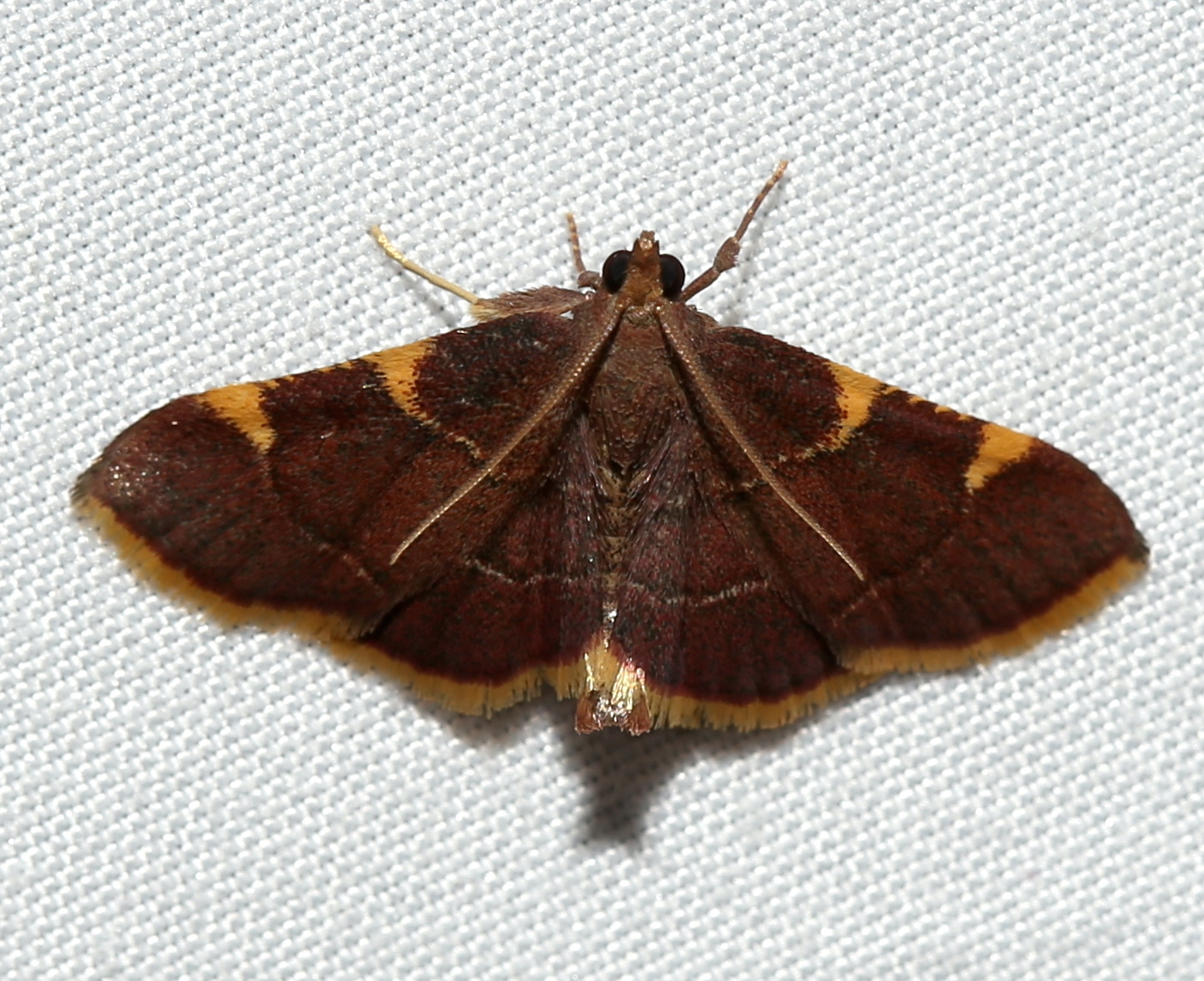

Scientific classification
- Kingdom: Animalia
- Phylum: Arthropoda
- Clade: Pancrustacea
- Class: Insecta
- Order: Lepidoptera
- Family: Pyralidae
- Genus: Hypsopygia
- Species: H. olinalis

Binomial name
- Hypsopygia olinalis (Guenée, 1854)

Synonyms
- Pyralis olinalis Guenée, 1854; Dolichomia olinalis; Asopia trentonalis Lederer, 1863; Asopia himonialis Zeller, 1872; Herculia infimbrialis Dyar, 1908; Herculia olinalis (Guenée, 1854)

= Hypsopygia olinalis =

Species of moth

Hypsopygia olinalis, the yellow-fringed dolichomia, is a moth of the family Pyralidae. It is found in eastern North America.

The wingspan is 16–24 mm. Adults are on wing from May to August in the American north-east and from May to September in North Carolina.

The larvae feed on Quercus species.
