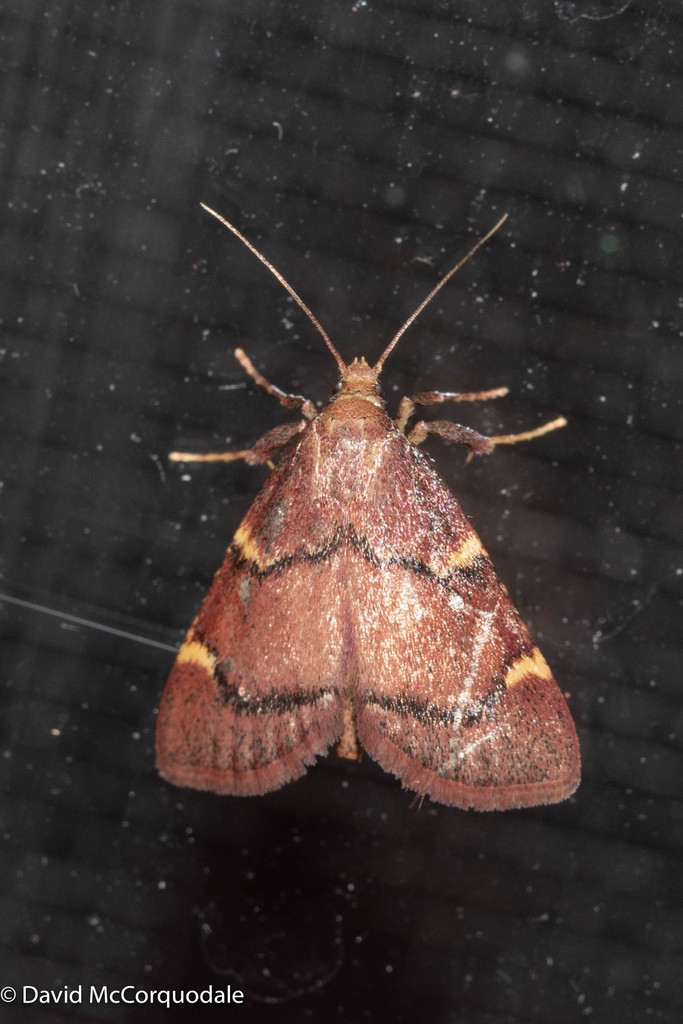

Scientific classification
- Kingdom: Animalia
- Phylum: Arthropoda
- Clade: Pancrustacea
- Class: Insecta
- Order: Lepidoptera
- Family: Pyralidae
- Genus: Hypsopygia
- Species: H. thymetusalis

Binomial name
- Hypsopygia thymetusalis (Walker, 1859)

Synonyms
- Botus thymetusalis Walker, 1859; Dolichomia thymetusalis; Herculia thymetusalis; Asopia devialis Grote, 1875

= Hypsopygia thymetusalis =

Species of moth

Hypsopygia thymetusalis, the spruce needleworm moth or paler dolichomia moth, is a species of snout moth in the genus Hypsopygia. It was described by Francis Walker in 1859 and is found in the northeastern United States and adjoining Canada west to British Columbia.

The wingspan is about 22 mm.

The larvae feed on Picea species. They roll the leaves of their host plant.
