= Hypsopygia plumbeoprunalis =

Scientific classification
- Kingdom: Animalia
- Phylum: Arthropoda
- Clade: Pancrustacea
- Class: Insecta
- Order: Lepidoptera
- Family: Pyralidae
- Genus: Hypsopygia
- Species: H. plumbeoprunalis

Binomial name
- Hypsopygia plumbeoprunalis (Hampson, 1917)

Synonyms
- Herculia plumbeoprunalis Hampson, 1917; Dolichomia plumbeoprunalis

Species of moth

Hypsopygia plumbeoprunalis is a species of snout moth in the genus Hypsopygia. It was described by George Hampson in 1917 and is found in Ecuador.
