= Hypsopygia repetita =

Scientific classification
- Kingdom: Animalia
- Phylum: Arthropoda
- Clade: Pancrustacea
- Class: Insecta
- Order: Lepidoptera
- Family: Pyralidae
- Genus: Hypsopygia
- Species: H. repetita

Binomial name
- Hypsopygia repetita (Butler, 1887)

Synonyms
- Pyralis repetita Butler, 1887; Ocrasa repetita; Orthopygia repetita; Herculia repetita

Species of moth

Hypsopygia repetita is a species of snout moth in the genus Hypsopygia described by Arthur Gardiner Butler in 1887. It is found in Australia (Queensland), New Guinea, French Polynesia, the Society Islands, the Solomon Islands and Japan.
