= Hypsopygia impurpuratalis =

Scientific classification
- Kingdom: Animalia
- Phylum: Arthropoda
- Clade: Pancrustacea
- Class: Insecta
- Order: Lepidoptera
- Family: Pyralidae
- Genus: Hypsopygia
- Species: H. impurpuratalis

Binomial name
- Hypsopygia impurpuratalis (Dognin, 1910)

Synonyms
- Pyralis impurpuratalis Dognin, 1910; Dolichomia impurpuratalis

Species of moth

Hypsopygia impurpuratalis is a species of snout moth in the genus Hypsopygia. It was described by Paul Dognin in 1910. It is found in Guyana.
