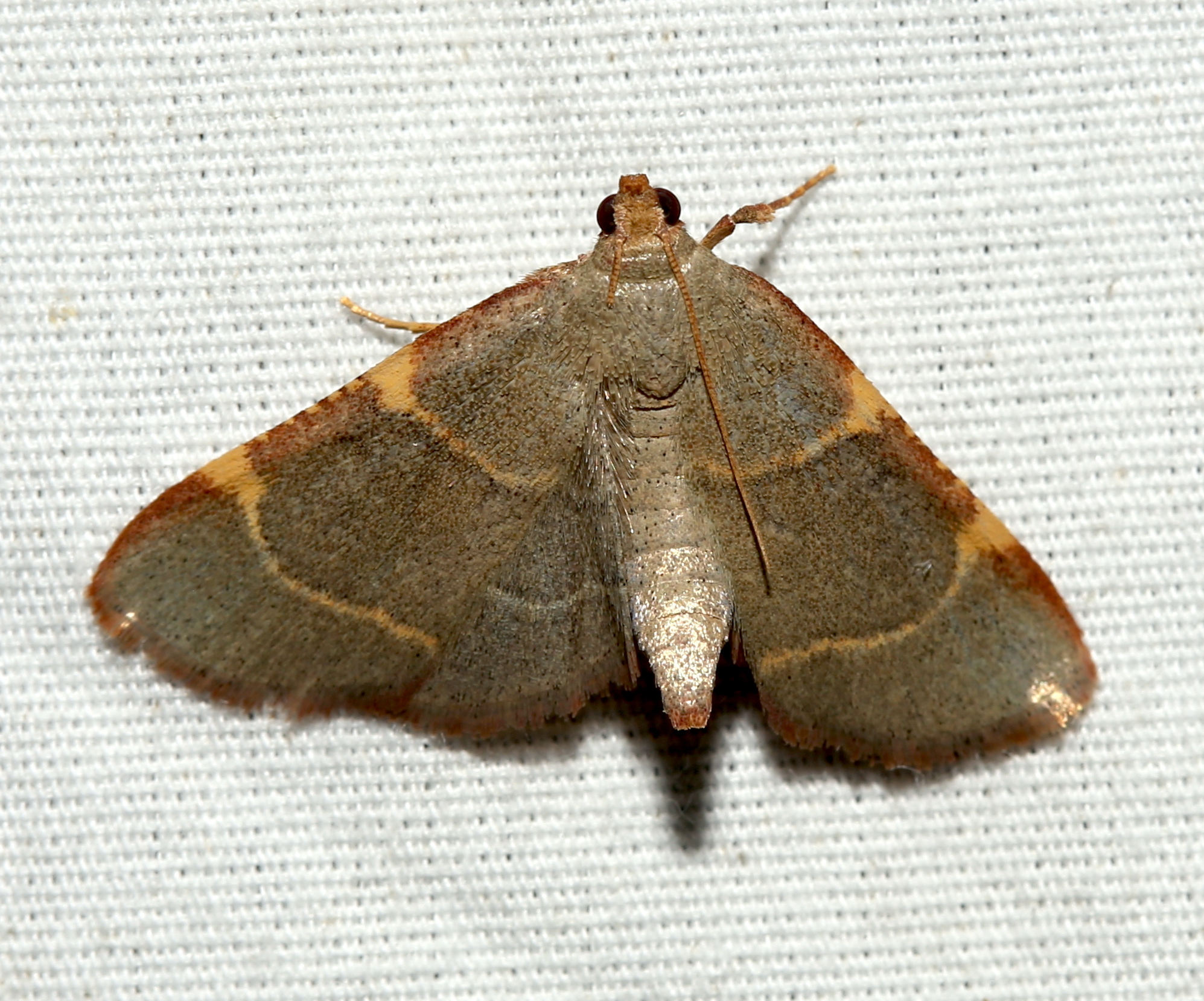

Scientific classification
- Kingdom: Animalia
- Phylum: Arthropoda
- Clade: Pancrustacea
- Class: Insecta
- Order: Lepidoptera
- Family: Pyralidae
- Genus: Hypsopygia
- Species: H. binodulalis

Binomial name
- Hypsopygia binodulalis (Zeller, 1872)

Synonyms
- Asopia binodulalis Zeller, 1872; Dolichomia binodulalis; Herculia binodulalis

= Hypsopygia binodulalis =

Species of moth

Hypsopygia binodulalis, the pink-fringed dolichomia moth, is a species of snout moth in the genus Hypsopygia. It was described by Philipp Christoph Zeller in 1872 and is found in the US from Texas to Florida, as well as in Georgia, Maryland, New Mexico, North Carolina, Oklahoma, Pennsylvania, South Carolina, Tennessee and West Virginia.

The wingspan is about 22 mm.
