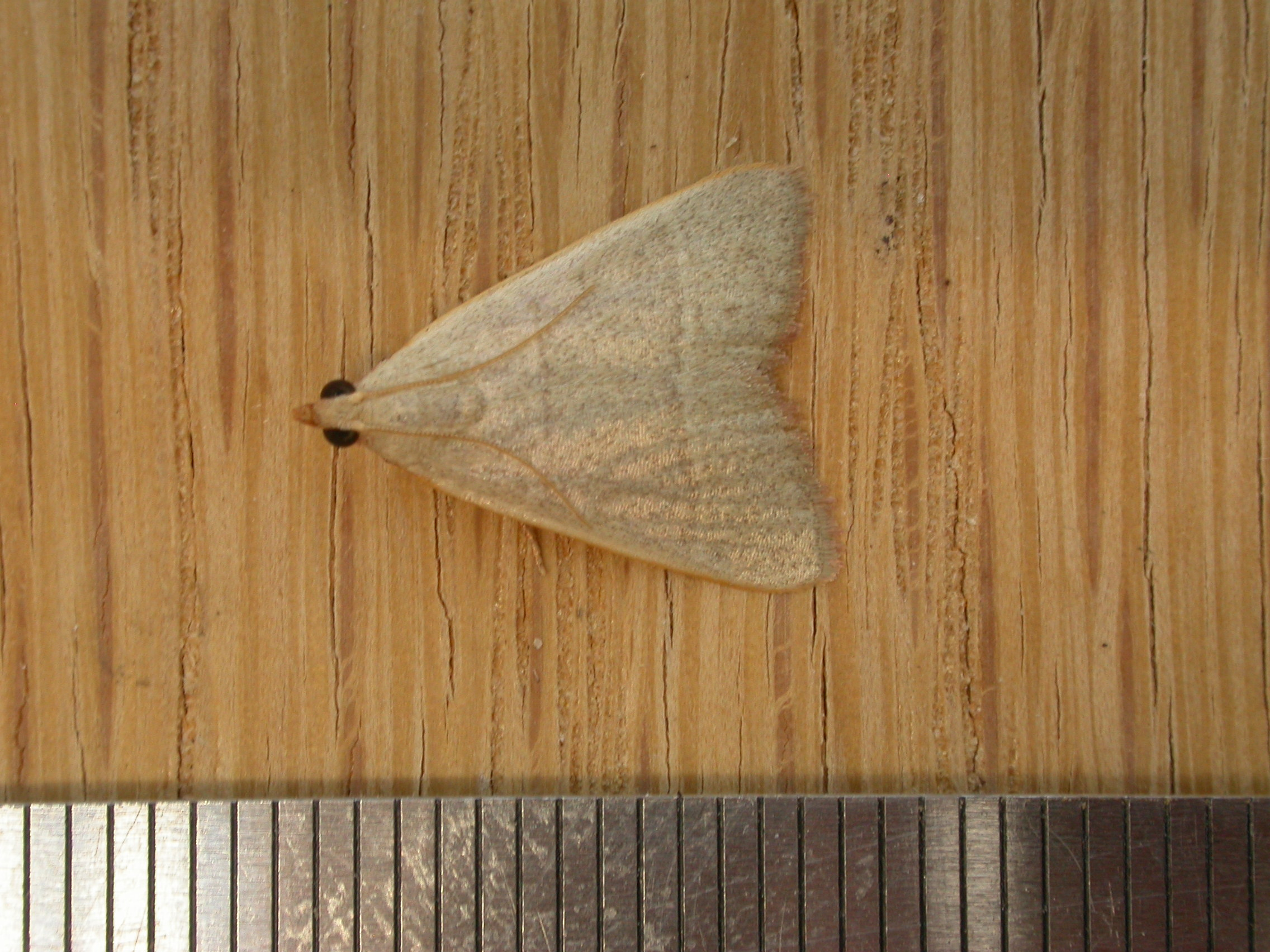

Scientific classification
- Kingdom: Animalia
- Phylum: Arthropoda
- Clade: Pancrustacea
- Class: Insecta
- Order: Lepidoptera
- Family: Pyralidae
- Genus: Hypsopygia
- Species: H. albidalis

Binomial name
- Hypsopygia albidalis (Walker, 1866)

Synonyms
- Ocrasa albidalis Walker, 1866; Spilodes rhodocryptalis Walker, 1866

= Hypsopygia albidalis =

Species of moth

Hypsopygia albidalis is a species of snout moth in the genus Hypsopygia. It was described by Francis Walker in 1866 and is known from Australia (including New South Wales and Queensland).
