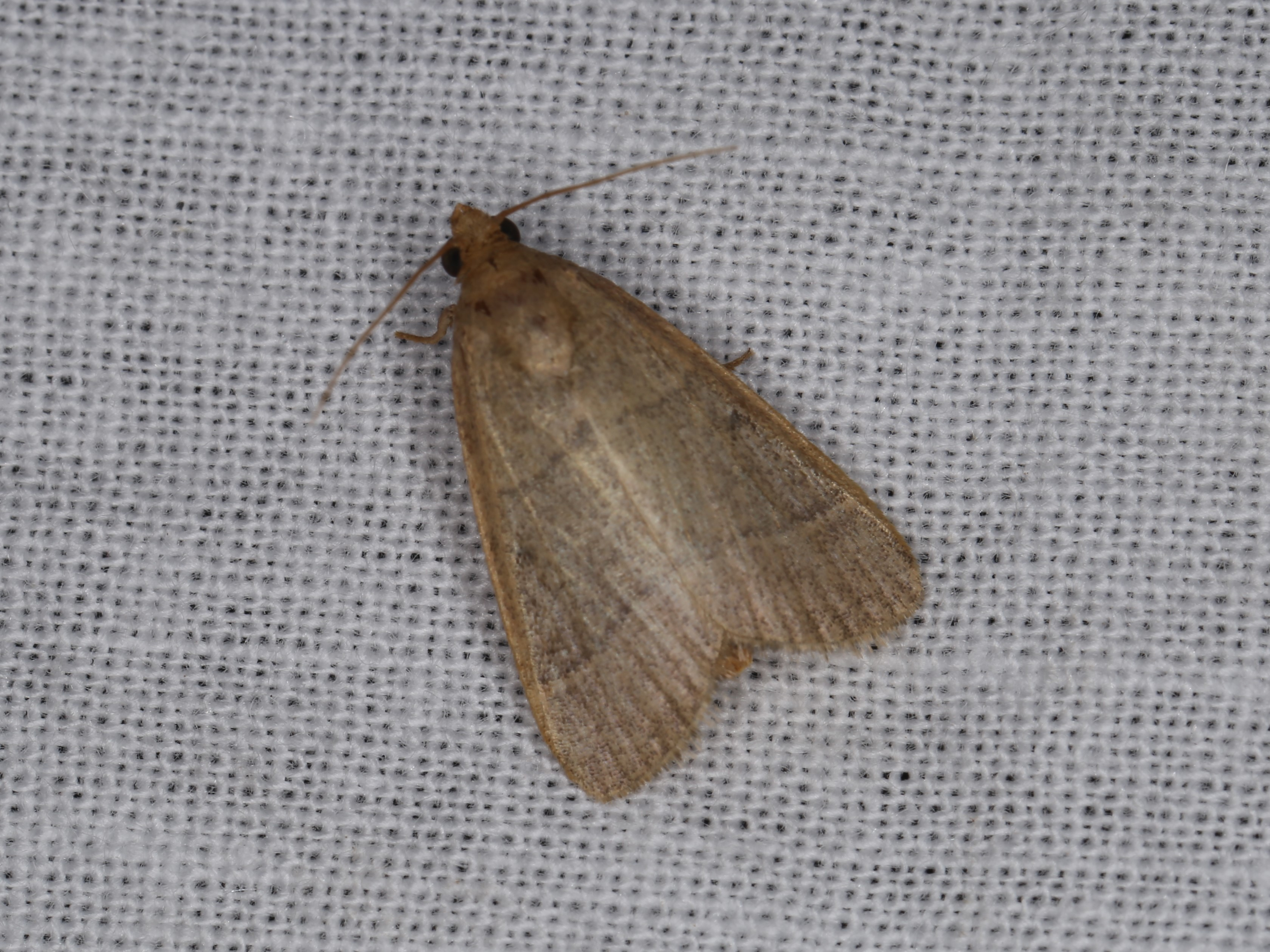

Scientific classification
- Kingdom: Animalia
- Phylum: Arthropoda
- Clade: Pancrustacea
- Class: Insecta
- Order: Lepidoptera
- Family: Pyralidae
- Genus: Hypsopygia
- Species: H. nostralis

Binomial name
- Hypsopygia nostralis (Guenée, 1854)

Synonyms
- Pyralis nostralis Guenée, 1854; Ocrasa nostralis; Herculia nostralis; Herculia psammioxantha Dyar, 1917; Herculia sordidalis Barnes & McDunnough, 1913; Herculia venezuelensis Amsel, 1956; Parasopia dissimilalis Möschler, 1890; Pyralis helenensis E. Wollaston, 1879; Ocrasa helenensis

= Hypsopygia nostralis =

Species of moth

Hypsopygia nostralis, the southern hayworm moth, is a species of snout moth. It was described by Achille Guenée in 1854. It has a wide distribution and is found in most of South America, Saint Helena, Réunion, Mauritius, Puerto Rico and in the southern United States, from Texas to Florida and Madagascar
