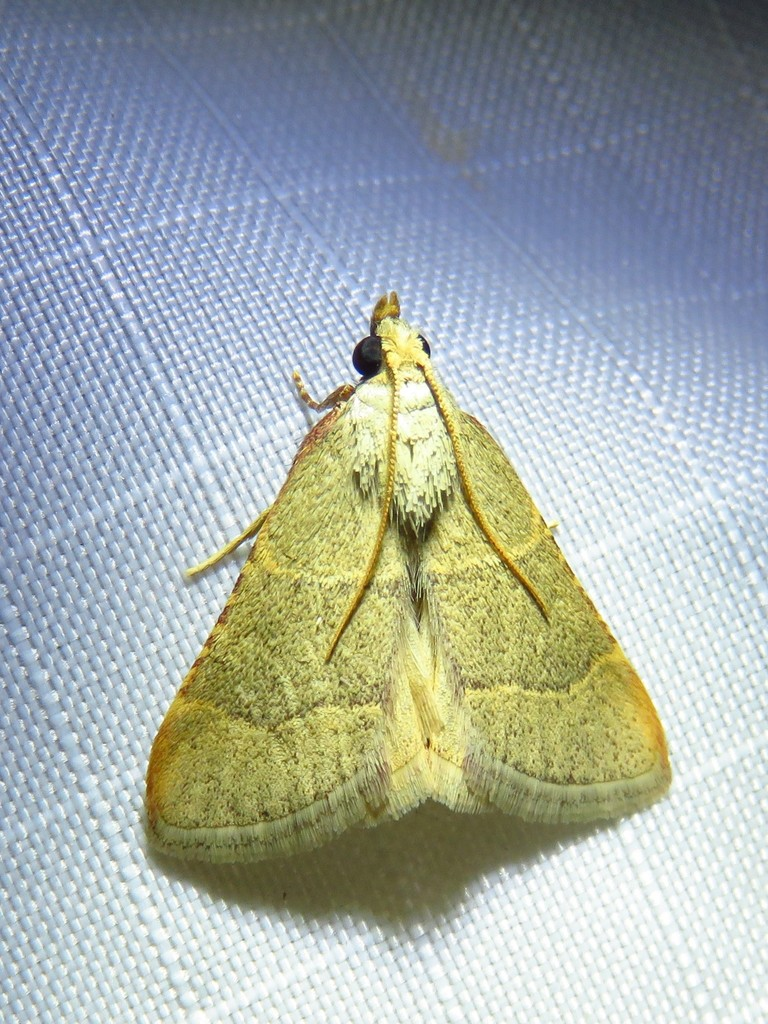

Scientific classification
- Kingdom: Animalia
- Phylum: Arthropoda
- Clade: Pancrustacea
- Class: Insecta
- Order: Lepidoptera
- Family: Pyralidae
- Genus: Hypsopygia
- Species: H. planalis

Binomial name
- Hypsopygia planalis (Grote, 1880)

Synonyms
- Asopia planalis Grote, 1880; Dolichomia planalis; Asopia enniculalis Hulst, 1886; Asopia occidentalis Hulst, 1886

= Hypsopygia planalis =

Species of moth

Hypsopygia planalis is a species of snout moth in the genus Hypsopygia. It was described by Augustus Radcliffe Grote in 1880 and is found in North America, including Colorado.
