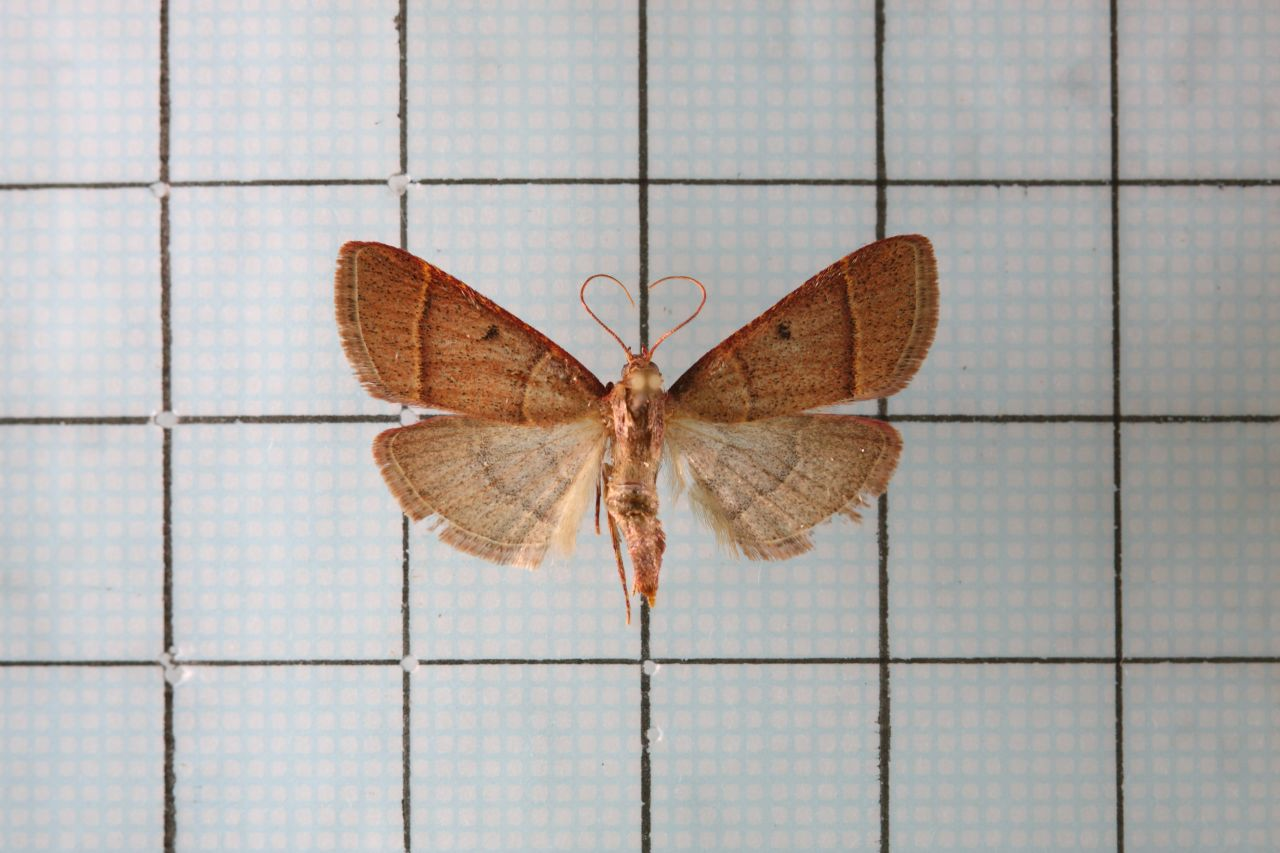

Scientific classification
- Kingdom: Animalia
- Phylum: Arthropoda
- Clade: Pancrustacea
- Class: Insecta
- Order: Lepidoptera
- Family: Pyralidae
- Genus: Hypsopygia
- Species: H. nannodes

Binomial name
- Hypsopygia nannodes (Butler, 1879)

Synonyms
- Pyralis nannodes Butler, 1879; Orthopygia nannodes; Herculia nannodes; Ocrasa nannodes

= Hypsopygia nannodes =

Species of moth

Hypsopygia nannodes is a moth of the family Pyralidae described by Arthur Gardiner Butler in 1879. It is found in Taiwan, Japan and Korea.

Adults are on wing from June to September.
