= Hypsopygia nigrapuncta =

Scientific classification
- Kingdom: Animalia
- Phylum: Arthropoda
- Clade: Pancrustacea
- Class: Insecta
- Order: Lepidoptera
- Family: Pyralidae
- Genus: Hypsopygia
- Species: H. nigrapuncta

Binomial name
- Hypsopygia nigrapuncta (Kaye, 1901)

Synonyms
- Pyralis nigrapuncta Kaye, 1901; Dolichomia nigrapuncta

Species of moth

Hypsopygia nigrapuncta is a species of snout moth in the genus Hypsopygia. It was described by William James Kaye in 1901. It is found in Trinidad.
