= Hypsopygia decoloralis =

Scientific classification
- Kingdom: Animalia
- Phylum: Arthropoda
- Clade: Pancrustacea
- Class: Insecta
- Order: Lepidoptera
- Family: Pyralidae
- Genus: Hypsopygia
- Species: H. decoloralis

Binomial name
- Hypsopygia decoloralis (Lederer, 1863)

Synonyms
- Asopia decoloralis Lederer, 1863; Ocrasa decoloralis; Herculia decoloralis

Species of moth

Hypsopygia decoloralis is a species of snout moth in the genus Hypsopygia. It was described by Julius Lederer in 1863 and is found in Australia.

The wingspan is about 30 mm.
