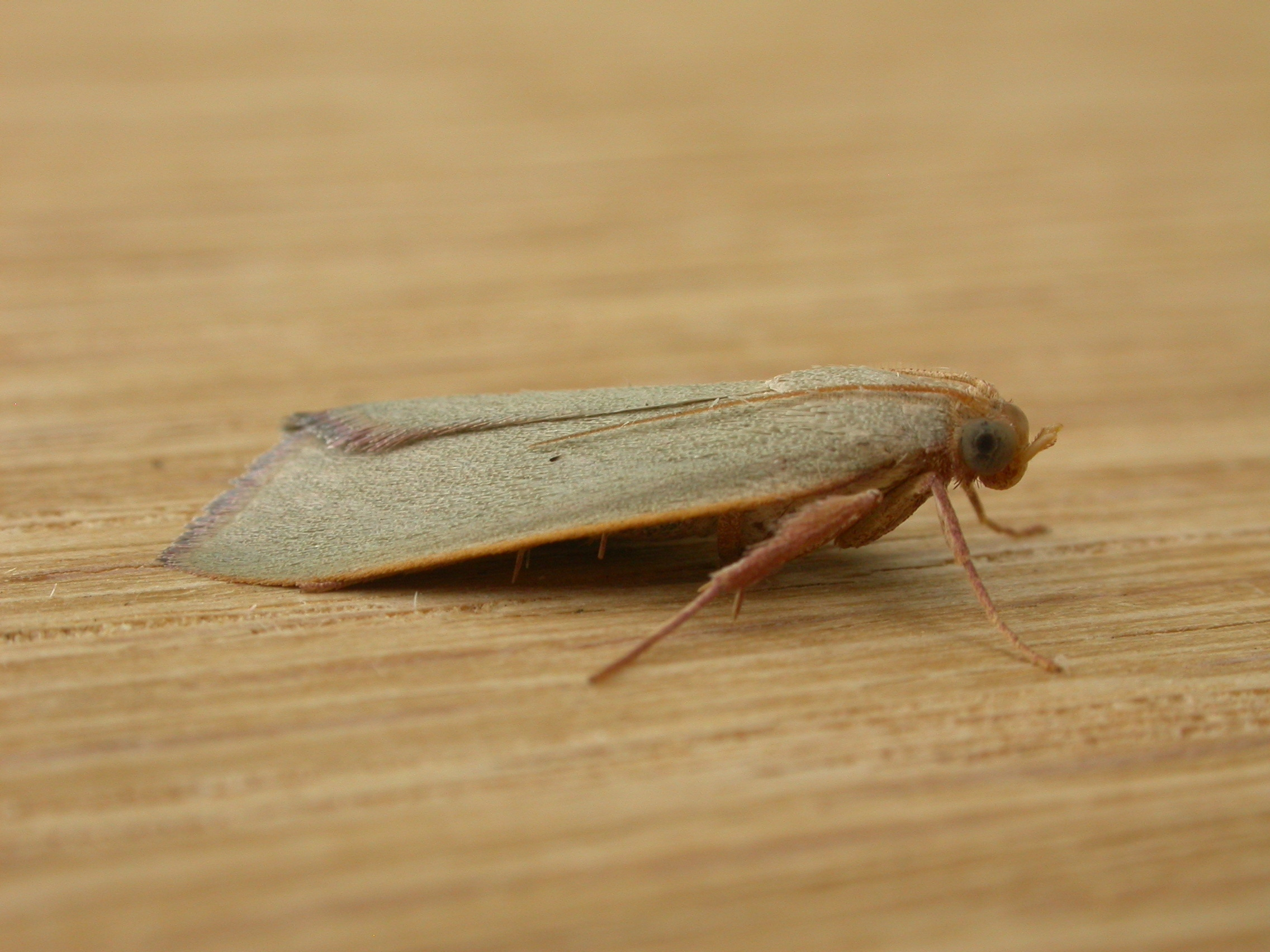

Scientific classification
- Kingdom: Animalia
- Phylum: Arthropoda
- Clade: Pancrustacea
- Class: Insecta
- Order: Lepidoptera
- Family: Pyralidae
- Genus: Hypsopygia
- Species: H. acerasta

Binomial name
- Hypsopygia acerasta (Turner, 1904)

Synonyms
- Herculia acerasta Turner, 1904; Ocrasa acerasta

= Hypsopygia acerasta =

Species of moth

Hypsopygia acerasta is a moth of the family Pyralidae. It was described by Alfred Jefferis Turner in 1904 and is found in Australia.
