= Hypsopygia graafialis =

Scientific classification
- Kingdom: Animalia
- Phylum: Arthropoda
- Clade: Pancrustacea
- Class: Insecta
- Order: Lepidoptera
- Family: Pyralidae
- Genus: Hypsopygia
- Species: H. graafialis

Binomial name
- Hypsopygia graafialis (Snellen, 1875)

Synonyms
- Asopia graafialis Snellen, 1975; Dolichomia graafialis

Species of moth

Hypsopygia graafialis is a species of snout moth in the genus Hypsopygia. It was described by Pieter Cornelius Tobias Snellen in 1875. It is found in Colombia.
