= Hypsopygia resectalis =

Scientific classification
- Kingdom: Animalia
- Phylum: Arthropoda
- Clade: Pancrustacea
- Class: Insecta
- Order: Lepidoptera
- Family: Pyralidae
- Genus: Hypsopygia
- Species: H. resectalis

Binomial name
- Hypsopygia resectalis (Lederer, 1863)

Synonyms
- Asopia resectalis Lederer, 1863; Dolichomia resectalis

Species of moth

Hypsopygia resectalis is a species of snout moth in the genus Hypsopygia. It was described by Julius Lederer in 1863 and is known from Venezuela.
