= Hypsopygia craspedalis =

Scientific classification
- Kingdom: Animalia
- Phylum: Arthropoda
- Clade: Pancrustacea
- Class: Insecta
- Order: Lepidoptera
- Family: Pyralidae
- Genus: Hypsopygia
- Species: H. craspedalis

Binomial name
- Hypsopygia craspedalis (Hampson, 1906)

Synonyms
- Tegulifera craspedalis Hampson, 1906; Dolichomia craspedalis

Species of moth

Dolichomia craspedalis is a species of snout moth in the genus Hypsopygia. It was described by George Hampson in 1906 and is known from Brazil.
