= Jinshichi Shibuya =

Japanese entomologist

Jinshichi Shibuya (渋谷 甚七, Shibuya Jinshichi) was a Japanese entomologist who specialized in the Lepidoptera, most notably cataloguing the Endotrichini and Galleriinae taxa of moths living in the country. Shibuya also described several species for the first time, including Homoeosoma matsumurella, Etielloides curvella, and Ceroprepes nigrolineatella.

== Selected Work ==
- Shibuya, J., 1927a. A study on the Japanese Epipaschiinae. Trans. Nat. Hist. Soc. Formosa 17 :339-359.
- Shibuya, J., 1927b. Some New and Unrecordes Species of Pyralidae from Corea (Lepid.). Insecta Matsumurana Sapporo, 2: 87-102
- Shibuya, J., 1928b. On the Japanese Crambinae (Lepid.). The systematic study on the Japanese Pyralinae (Lepid.). Journal of the Faculty of Agriculture, Hokkaido Imperial University = 北海道帝國大學農學部紀要. 21(4): 121-147
- Shibuya, J., 1928c. The Systematic Study on the Japanese Pyralinae (Lepid.). Journal of the Faculty of Agriculture, Hokkaido Imperial University = 北海道帝國大學農學部紀要. Vol.21(4): 149-176
- Shibuya, J., 1928d. The systematic study on the Formosan Pyralidae. Jour.Facul.Agr., Hokkaido Imp.Univ. Vol.22:1–300
- Shibuya, J. 1929a: On the Pyralidae from the Bonin islands. – Insecta Matsumurana, Sapporo 3 (2–3): 111–114.
- Shibuya, J. 1929b. On the Japanese Hydrocampinae. - Insecta Matsumurana, N.S. 3(2–3):120–136
- Shibuya, J., 1929c. On the known and unrecorded species of the Japanese Pyranstinae (Lepid.). Journal of the Faculty of Agriculture, Hokkaido Imperial University = 北海道帝國大學農學部紀要. 25(3), 1929, 151-242
