= List of moths of South Africa (Pyralidae) =

This is a list of moths of the family Pyralidae that are found in South Africa. It also acts as an index to the species articles and forms part of the full List of moths of South Africa.

- Abachausia grisea Balinsky, 1994
- Abrephia incongruella (Warren, 1914)
- Achroia grisella (Fabricius, 1794)
- Achroia innotata Walker, 1864
- Acrobasis africanella Balinsky, 1994
- Acrobasis diversicolor Ragonot, 1893
- Acrobasis ramosella Walker, 1866
- Actenia achromalis Hampson, 1906
- Actenia obliquisignalis Hampson, 1906
- Actenia rhodesialis Hampson, 1906
- Afromyelois communis Balinsky, 1991
- Afromylea natalica Balinsky, 1994
- Afropsipyla pictella Balinsky, 1994
- Afropsipyla similis Balinsky, 1994
- Aglossa basalis Walker, 1865
- Aglossa ferrealis Hampson, 1906
- Aglossa formosa Butler, 1875
- Aglossa inconspicua Butler, 1875
- Aglossa incultalis Zeller, 1852
- Aglossa infuscalis Hampson, 1906
- Aglossa pinguinalis (Linnaeus, 1758)
- Aglossa rhodalis Hampson, 1906
- Aglossa steralis Felder & Rogenhofer, 1875
- Aglossa thermochroa Hampson, 1916
- Aglossodes prionophoralis Ragonot, 1891
- Alispoides vermiculella Ragonot, 1888
- Ambetilia curcifera Balinsky, 1994
- Anagasta kuehniella (Zeller, 1879)
- Ancylosis aeola Balinsky, 1987
- Ancylosis albipunctella (Warren, 1914)
- Ancylosis atrisparsella (Hampson, 1901)
- Ancylosis bohemani (Zeller, 1852)
- Ancylosis capensis Ragonot, 1888
- Ancylosis detersella Hampson, 1926
- Ancylosis eugraphella Balinsky, 1987
- Ancylosis eurhoda Balinsky, 1989
- Ancylosis glaphyria Balinsky, 1987
- Ancylosis inangulella Warren, 1914
- Ancylosis interjectella (Ragonot, 1888)
- Ancylosis luederitzella Balinsky, 1989
- Ancylosis melanophlebia Balinsky, 1989
- Ancylosis montana Balinsky, 1989
- Ancylosis namibiella Balinsky, 1987
- Ancylosis obscurella Balinsky, 1989
- Ancylosis ocellella (Hampson, 1901)
- Ancylosis perfervida Balinsky, 1989
- Ancylosis rufociliella Ragonot, 1888
- Ancylosis similis Balinsky, 1987
- Ancylosis subpyrethrella (Ragonot, 1888)
- Ancylosis ustocapitella (Hampson, 1901)
- Anerastia flaveolella Ragonot, 1887
- Anobostra discimacula Hampson, 1917
- Aphomia caffralis Hampson, 1917
- Aphomia distictella Hampson, 1917
- Aphomia murina (Wallengren, 1875)
- Aphomia zelleri (de Joannis, 1932)
- Apomyelois bicolorata Balinsky, 1991
- Arsissa transvaalica Balinsky, 1991
- Aspithroides minuta Balinsky, 1994
- Azanicola adspersa Balinsky, 1991
- Bahiria defecta Balinsky, 1994
- Bahiria durbanica Balinsky, 1994
- Bahiria flavicosta Balinsky, 1994
- Bahiria latevalva Balinsky, 1994
- Bahiria macrognatha Balinsky, 1994
- Bahiria magna Balinsky, 1994
- Bahiria similis Balinsky, 1994
- Bahiria ximenianata Balinsky, 1994
- Biafra concinnella Ragonot, 1888
- Biafra separatella (Ragonot, 1888)
- Bostra albilineata (Warren, 1891)
- Bostra carnicolor Warren, 1914
- Bostra coenochroa Hampson, 1917
- Bostra conflualis Hampson, 1906
- Bostra conspicualis Warren, 1911
- Bostra dipectinialis Hampson, 1906
- Bostra exustalis (Guenée, 1854)
- Bostra ferrealis Hampson, 1906
- Bostra flavicostalis Warren, 1914
- Bostra glaucalis Hampson, 1906
- Bostra lateritialis (Guenée, 1854)
- Bostra maculilinea Hampson, 1917
- Bostra mucidalis (Guenée, 1854)
- Bostra noctuina (Butler, 1875)
- Bostra pallidicolor Hampson, 1917
- Bostra pallidifrons Hampson, 1917
- Bostra perrubida Hampson, 1910
- Bostra puncticostalis Hampson, 1898
- Bostra pyroxantha Hampson, 1906
- Bostra rufimarginalis Hampson, 1906
- Bostra sentalis Hampson, 1906
- Bostra tenebralis Hampson, 1906
- Bostra tripartita (Warren, 1897)
- Bostra tristis (Butler, 1881)
- Bostra vetustalis (Zeller, 1852)
- Bostra xanthorhodalis Hampson, 1906
- Cabotella inconspicua Balinsky, 1994
- Cactoblastis cactorum (Berg, 1885)
- Cadra cautella (Walker, 1863)
- Cadra figulilella (Gregson, 1871)
- Cadra rectivittella (Ragonot, 1901)
- Candiope joannisella Ragonot, 1888
- Candiopella dukei Balinsky, 1994
- Cantheleamima excisa Balinsky, 1994
- Caustella phoenicias Hampson, 1930
- Ceuthelea umtalensis Balinsky, 1994
- Ceutholopha isidis (Zeller, 1867)
- Commotria albinervella Hampson, 1918
- Commotria castaneipars Hampson, 1918
- Commotria leucosparsalis Janse, 1922
- Commotria phlebicella Hampson, 1918
- Commotria rhodoneura Hampson, 1918
- Corcyra cephalonica (Stainton, 1866)
- Cryptoblabes gnidiella (Millière, 1867)
- Cunibertoides nigripatagiata Balinsky, 1994
- Delopterus basalis Janse, 1922
- Didia subramosella Ragonot, 1893
- Discofrontia normella Hampson, 1901
- Ditrachyptera verruciferella (Ragonot, 1888)
- Dysphylia viridella Ragonot, 1888
- Ectomyelois ceratoniae (Zeller, 1839)
- Eldana saccharina Walker, 1865
- Elegia inconspicuella (Ragonot, 1888)
- Eleusina homoeosomella Hampson, 1901
- Ematheudes convexus Shaffer, 1997
- Ematheudes crassinotellus Ragonot, 1888
- Ematheudes elysium Shaffer, 1997
- Ematheudes erectus Shaffer, 1997
- Ematheudes hispidus Shaffer, 1997
- Ematheudes maculescens Shaffer, 1997
- Ematheudes natalensis Shaffer, 1997
- Ematheudes neonepsia Martin, 1956
- Ematheudes neurias (Hampson, 1918)
- Ematheudes paleatellus Ragonot, 1888
- Ematheudes rhodochrous (Hampson, 1918)
- Ematheudes setiger Shaffer, 1997
- Ematheudes sinuosus Shaffer, 1997
- Ematheudes straminella Snellen, 1872
- Ematheudes strictus Shaffer, 1997
- Ematheudes toxalis Shaffer, 1997
- Ematheudes triangularis Shaffer, 1997
- Emmalocera laminella Hampson, 1901
- Emmalocera leucopleura (Hampson, 1918)
- Emporia melanobasis Balinsky, 1991
- Encryphodes ethiopella Balinsky, 1991
- Endolasia transvaalica Hampson, 1926
- Endotricha consobrinalis Zeller, 1852
- Endotricha ellisoni Whalley, 1963
- Endotricha erythralis Mabille, 1900
- Ephestia elutella (Hübner, 1796)
- Epicrocis abbreviata (Balinsky, 1994)
- Epicrocis africana (Janse, 1942)
- Epicrocis africanella (Ragonot, 1888)
- Epicrocis albigeralis (Walker, 1865)
- Epicrocis ancylosiformis (Balinsky, 1994)
- Epicrocis arcana (Balinsky, 1994)
- Epicrocis atratella (Ragonot, 1888)
- Epicrocis brevipalpata (Balinsky, 1994)
- Epicrocis complicata (Balinsky, 1994)
- Epicrocis coriacelloides (Balinsky, 1994)
- Epicrocis crassa (Balinsky, 1994)
- Epicrocis ferrealis (Hampson, 1898)
- Epicrocis flavicosta (Balinsky, 1994)
- Epicrocis furcilinea (Balinsky, 1994)
- Epicrocis gracilis (Balinsky, 1994)
- Epicrocis holophaea (Hampson, 1926)
- Epicrocis imitans (Balinsky, 1994)
- Epicrocis insolita (Balinsky, 1994)
- Epicrocis intermedia (Balinsky, 1994)
- Epicrocis laticostella (Ragonot, 1888)
- Epicrocis nigricans (Ragonot, 1888)
- Epicrocis nigrinella (Balinsky, 1994)
- Epicrocis noncapillata (Balinsky, 1994)
- Epicrocis ornata (Balinsky, 1994)
- Epicrocis ornatella (Balinsky, 1994)
- Epicrocis picta (Balinsky, 1991)
- Epicrocis piliferella (Ragonot, 1888)
- Epicrocis plumbifasciata (Balinsky, 1994)
- Epicrocis pseudonatalensis (Balinsky, 1994)
- Epicrocis punctata (Balinsky, 1994)
- Epicrocis sacculata (Balinsky, 1994)
- Epicrocis saturatella Mabille, 1879
- Epicrocis siderella (Ragonot, 1888)
- Epicrocis spiculata (Balinsky, 1994)
- Epicrocis stibiella (Snellen, 1872)
- Epicrocis vansoni (Balinsky, 1994)
- Epilepia melanobasis (Hampson, 1906)
- Epilepia melanobrunnea (Janse, 1922)
- Epilepia melanosparsalis (Janse, 1922)
- Epilepia melapastalis (Hampson, 1906)
- Episindris albimaculalis Ragonot, 1891
- Essina atribasalis Ragonot, 1891
- Etiella zinckenella (Treitschke, 1832)
- Eucarphia anomala Balinsky, 1994
- Eucarphia leucomera (Hampson, 1926)
- Eulophota caustella (Hampson, 1901)
- Eulophota zonata Hampson, 1926
- Eurhodope confusella (Walker, 1866)
- Eurhodope infixella (Walker, 1866)
- Eurhodope notulella (Ragonot, 1888)
- Eurhodope nyctosia Balinsky, 1991
- Euzophera crassignatha Balinsky, 1994
- Euzophera crinita Balinsky, 1994
- Euzophera cullinanensis (Balinsky, 1991)
- Euzophera minima Balinsky, 1994
- Euzophera neomeniella Ragonot, 1888
- Euzophera stramentella Ragonot, 1888
- Euzophera termivelata Balinsky, 1994
- Euzophera villora (Felder & Rogenhofer, 1875)
- Euzopherodes capicola Balinsky, 1994
- Faveria dionysia (Zeller, 1846)
- Faveria dubia (Balinsky, 1994)
- Faveria fusca (Balinsky, 1994)
- Faveria ignicephalis (Balinsky, 1994)
- Faveria minima (Balinsky, 1994)
- Faveria minuscula (Balinsky, 1994)
- Faveria nonceracanthia (Balinsky, 1994)
- Faveria onigra (Balinsky, 1994)
- Faveria poliostrota (Balinsky, 1994)
- Flabellobasis capensis (Hampson, 1901)
- Flabellobasis montana Balinsky, 1991
- Gaana asperella (Ragonot, 1893)
- Gaana basiferella Walker, 1866
- Gaana mesophaea (Hampson, 1930)
- Gaana minima Balinsky, 1994
- Gaana quatra Balinsky, 1994
- Galleria mellonella (Linnaeus, 1758)
- Getulia fulviplagella Hampson, 1901
- Getulia institella Ragonot, 1888
- Getulia maculosa Balinsky, 1994
- Getulia semifuscella Ragonot, 1893
- Grammiphlebia striata (Druce, 1902)
- Hannemanneia tacapella (Ragonot, 1887)
- Herculia caesalis (Zeller, 1852)
- Herculia griseobrunnea Hampson, 1917
- Herculia lacteocilia Hampson, 1917
- Herculia roseotincta Hampson, 1917
- Herculia tenuis (Butler, 1880)
- Heterochrosis oligochrodes Hampson, 1926
- Hobohmia paradoxa Balinsky, 1994
- Homoeosoma botydella Ragonot, 1888
- Homoeosoma masaiense Balinsky, 1991
- Homoeosoma quinquepunctella (Warren, 1914)
- Homoeosoma scopulella Ragonot, 1888
- Homoeosoma stenoteum Hampson, 1926
- Homoeosoma terminella Ragonot, 1901
- Hosidia ochrineurella Hampson, 1901
- Hydaspia dorsipunctella Ragonot, 1888
- Hypargyria metalliferella Ragonot, 1888
- Hypotia aglossalis (Hampson, 1906)
- Hypotia bolinalis (Walker, 1859)
- Hypotia grisescens (Warren, 1914)
- Hypotia ornata Druce, 1902
- Hypotia pallidicarnea (Warren, 1914)
- Hypotia phaeagonalis (Hampson, 1906)
- Hypsipyla robusta (Moore, 1886)
- Hypsopygia mauritialis (Boisduval, 1833)
- Hypsopygia sanguinalis Warren, 1897
- Hypsotropa adumbratella Ragonot, 1888
- Hypsotropa chionorhabda Hampson, 1918
- Hypsotropa contrastella (Ragonot, 1888)
- Hypsotropa graptophlebia Hampson, 1918
- Hypsotropa infumatella Ragonot, 1901
- Hypsotropa leucophlebiella (Ragonot, 1888)
- Hypsotropa ochricostella Hampson, 1918
- Hypsotropa polyactinia (Hampson, 1901)
- Hypsotropa rhodochroella Hampson, 1918
- Hypsotropa roseotincta Janse, 1922
- Hypsotropa sabuletella (Zeller, 1852)
- Hypsotropa subcostella Hampson, 1918
- Isolopha albicristata Warren, 1911
- Joannisia conisella (Hampson, 1926)
- Joannisia heterotypa Balinsky, 1994
- Joannisia jansei Balinsky, 1994
- Joannisia poliopasta Balinsky, 1994
- Joannisia semiales Balinsky, 1994
- Lamoria adaptella (Walker, 1863)
- Lamoria anella ([Denis & Schiffermüller], 1775)
- Lamoria attamasca Whalley, 1964
- Lamoria cafrella (Ragonot, 1888)
- Lamoria exiguata Whalley, 1964
- Lamoria imbella (Walker, 1864)
- Lamoria pallens Whalley, 1964
- Laodamia affinis Balinsky, 1994
- Laodamia glaucocephalis Balinsky, 1994
- Laodamia grisella Balinsky, 1994
- Laodamia homotypa Balinsky, 1994
- Laodamia hortensis Balinsky, 1994
- Laodamia inermis Balinsky, 1994
- Laodamia injucunda Balinsky, 1994
- Laodamia karkloofensis Balinsky, 1994
- Laodamia lugubris Balinsky, 1994
- Laodamia natalensis (Ragonot, 1888)
- Laodamia nigerrima Balinsky, 1994
- Laodamia nonplagella Balinsky, 1994
- Laodamia pulchra Balinsky, 1994
- Laodamia salisburyensis Balinsky, 1994
- Laodamia sarniensis Balinsky, 1994
- Laodamia similis Balinsky, 1994
- Laodamia spissa Balinsky, 1994
- Laodamia squamata Balinsky, 1994
- Laodamia zoetendalensis Balinsky, 1994
- Lepidogma rubricalis Hampson, 1906
- Leviantenna ferox Balinsky, 1994
- Loryma athalialis (Walker, 1859)
- Loryma recusata (Walker, 1864)
- Loryma sentiusalis Walker, 1859
- Loryma sinuosalis Leraut, 2007
- Lorymodes digonialis (Hampson, 1906)
- Lorymodes stenopteralis Hampson, 1917
- Macalla confusa Janse, 1922
- Macalla fasciculata Hampson, 1906
- Macrovalva quadrielevata Balinsky, 1994
- Megasis barrettae Hampson, 1901
- Melanalis perfusca Hampson, 1906
- Melanastia bicolor Hampson, 1930
- Metacrateria perirrorella Hampson, 1918
- Metoecis carnifex (Coquerel, 1855)
- Miliberta gnathilata Balinsky, 1994
- Mittonia hampsoni (Distant, 1897)
- Mussidia melanoneura Ragonot, 1893
- Mussidia nigrivenella Ragonot, 1888
- Myelodes flavimargo Hampson, 1930
- Myelodes jansei Hampson, 1930
- Namibicola simplex Balinsky, 1994
- Namibicola splendida Balinsky, 1991
- Namibiopsis punctata Balinsky, 1994
- Navasota leuconeurella Hampson, 1918
- Neobostra ferruginealis Hampson, 1906
- Neopaschia flavociliata Janse, 1922
- Nephopterix angustella (Hübner, 1796)
- Nephopterix apotomella (Meyrick, 1886)
- Nephopterix caradrinella Ragonot, 1893
- Nephopterix divisella (Duponchel, 1842)
- Nephopterix emussitatella Ragonot, 1893
- Nephopterix quilimanella Pagenstecher, 1893
- Nephopterix rufostriatella Pagenstecher, 1893
- Nephopterix variella Walker, 1866
- Nonphycita lineata Balinsky, 1994
- Nyctegretis inclinella Ragonot, 1888
- Nyctegretis leonina (Hampson, 1930)
- Oligochroides nigritella Strand, 1909
- Oncocera ochreomelanella (Ragonot, 1888)
- Orthaga cryptochalcis de Joannis, 1927
- Ortholepis polyodonta Balinsky, 1991
- Ortholepis pyrobasis Balinsky, 1991
- Ortholepis rectilineella (Ragonot, 1888)
- Ortholepis subgenistella (Hampson, 1901)
- Ortholepis unguinata Balinsky, 1994
- Oryctocera aurocupralis Ragonot, 1891
- Oxybia transversella (Duponchel, 1836)
- Paractenia atrisparsalis Hampson, 1906
- Paractenia phaeomesalis Hampson, 1906
- Paractenia thermalis Hampson, 1906
- Paralaodamia angustata Balinsky, 1994
- Paralaodamia fraudulenta Balinsky, 1994
- Paralaodamia grapholithella (Ragonot, 1888)
- Paralaodamia haploa Balinsky, 1994
- Paralaodamia modesta Balinsky, 1994
- Paralaodamia pretoriensis Balinsky, 1994
- Paralaodamia rivulella (Ragonot, 1888)
- Paralaodamia serrata Balinsky, 1994
- Paralaodamia subdivisella (Ragonot, 1893)
- Paralaodamia subligaculata Balinsky, 1994
- Paralaodamia transvaalica Balinsky, 1994
- Paralipsa exacta Whalley, 1962
- Paraphomia natalensis Hampson, 1901
- Parematheudes crista Shaffer, 1997
- Parematheudes diacanthus Shaffer, 1997
- Parematheudes dionyx Shaffer, 1997
- Parematheudes hamulus Shaffer, 1997
- Parematheudes immaculatus Shaffer, 1997
- Parematheudes interpunctellus (Hampson, 1918)
- Parematheudes onyx Shaffer, 1997
- Parematheudes polystictellus (Hampson, 1918)
- Parematheudes roseotinctus (Janse, 1922)
- Parematheudes simplex (Janse, 1922)
- Parematheudes tenuis Shaffer, 1997
- Pempelia aurivilliella (Ragonot, 1888)
- Pempelia morosalis (Saalmüller, 1880)
- Pempelia palumbella ([Denis & Schiffermüller], 1775)
- Phycita attenuata Balinsky, 1994
- Phycita exaggerata Balinsky, 1994
- Phycita ligubris Balinsky, 1994
- Phycita randensis Balinsky, 1994
- Phycita singularis Balinsky, 1994
- Phycita spiculata Balinsky, 1994
- Phycita spissoterminata Balinsky, 1994
- Phycita suppenditata Balinsky, 1994
- Phycitophila obscurita Balinsky, 1994
- Phycitopsis insulata Balinsky, 1994
- Piesmopoda notandella Ragonot, 1893
- Plagoa cerostomella (Ragonot, 1888)
- Plagoa zambeziella (Hampson, 1901)
- Plodia interpunctella (Hübner, [1813])
- Pogononeura hirticostella Ragonot, 1888
- Pogonotropha wahlbergi Zeller, 1852
- Polyocha anomalella Janse, 1922
- Polyocha plinthochroa Hampson, 1918
- Polyocha rhodesiae Strand, 1909
- Polyocha sanguinariella (Zeller, 1848)
- Pretoria hutchinsoni Ragonot, 1893
- Pretoria nigribasis Balinsky, 1994
- Proancylosis argenticostata Balinsky, 1991
- Prophtasia sphalmatella Hampson, 1918
- Prosaris pulverea Hampson, 1906
- Prosaris rufalis Hampson, 1906
- Pseudogetulia luminosa Balinsky, 1994
- Pseudographis dermatina Balinsky, 1994
- Pseudographis mesosema Balinsky, 1989
- Psorosa africana Balinsky, 1991
- Psorosa myrmidonella Ragonot, 1901
- Pylamorpha albida Balinsky, 1994
- Pylamorpha cristata Balinsky, 1994
- Pyralis albilautalis Warren, 1891
- Pyralis biblisalis (Walker, 1859)
- Pyralis dentibasalis Warren, 1914
- Pyralis effulgens Warren, 1914
- Pyralis farinalis Linnaeus, 1758
- Pyralis fumipennis Butler, 1889
- Pyralis manihotalis Guenée, 1854
- Pyralis rubellalis Zeller, 1852
- Pyralis secretalis Wallengren, 1875
- Pyralosis polycyclophora (Hampson, 1916)
- Quasiexuperius rhodesianus Balinsky, 1994
- Ramosignathos inconspicuella Balinsky, 1994
- Rhinaphe castanealis Hampson, 1912
- Rhinaphe flavodorsalis Janse, 1922
- Rhinaphe lutosa Janse, 1922
- Rhinaphe nigricostalis (Walker, 1863)
- Rhinaphe seeboldi (Ragonot, 1894)
- Rhodochrysa superbella Hampson, 1901
- Rhynchopaschia melanolopha Hampson, 1906
- Rhynchopaschia reducta Janse, 1931
- Sacada rhodinalis Hampson, 1906
- Sacada rosealis Hampson, 1906
- Saluria albicostella Janse, 1922
- Saluria devylderi (Ragonot, 1888)
- Saluria inficita (Walker, 1863)
- Saluria macrella (Ragonot, 1888)
- Saluria mesomelanella Hampson, 1918
- Saluria pretoriae Janse, 1922
- Saluria pulverata Janse, 1922
- Saluria rhodophaea Hampson, 1918
- Saluria stictophora Hampson, 1918
- Saluria subcarnella (Ragonot, 1888)
- Saluria tripartitella Ragonot, 1901
- Samaria inconspicuella Balinsky, 1994
- Samaria indentella Ragonot, 1893
- Sematoneura africana Balinsky, 1994
- Shebania grandis Balinsky, 1991
- Shebania maculata Balinsky, 1991
- Sindris magnifica Jordan, 1904
- Sindris sganzini Boisduval, 1833
- Spatulipalpia monstrosa Balinsky, 1994
- Sphinctocera crassisquama Warren, 1897
- Statina albivenella Janse, 1922
- Staudingeria magnifica (Butler, 1875)
- Staudingeria mimeugraphella Balinsky, 1989
- Stemmatophora chloralis Hampson, 1917
- Stemmatophora depressalis Walker, 1862
- Stemmatophora erebalis Hampson, 1917
- Stemmatophora flavirubralis Warren, 1891
- Stemmatophora hemicyclalis Hampson, 1917
- Stemmatophora oleagina (Warren, 1891)
- Stemmatophora perrubralis Hampson, 1917
- Stemmatophora xanthozonalis Hampson, 1906
- Synaphe styphlotricha Hampson, 1906
- Synoria euglyphella Ragonot, 1888
- Tegulifera bostralis Hampson, 1917
- Tegulifera flavirubralis (Hampson, 1906)
- Tegulifera holothermalis Hampson, 1906
- Tegulifera oblunata (Warren, 1897)
- Tegulifera obovalis Hampson, 1917
- Tegulifera ochrealis Hampson, 1917
- Tegulifera rubicundalis Saalmüller, 1880
- Tegulifera zonalis (Warren, 1897)
- Thylacoptila paurosema Meyrick, 1885
- Trachylepidia fructicassiella Ragonot, 1887
- Trachypteryx acanthotecta Rebel, 1927
- Trachypteryx albisecta Hampson, 1926
- Trachypteryx heterogramma Hampson, 1926
- Trachypteryx magella (Zeller, 1848)
- Trachypteryx rhodoxantha Hampson, 1926
- Trachypteryx rubripictella Hampson, 1901
- Trachypteryx victoriola Balinsky, 1991
- Triphassa marshalli (Hampson, 1906)
- Triphassa stalachtis Hübner, 1818
- Tucumania tapiacola Dyar, 1925
- Tyndis dentilinealis Hampson, 1906
- Tyndis proteanalis Hampson, 1906
- Ulophora flavinia Balinsky, 1994
- Urbania lophopterella Hampson, 1901
- Veldticola irrorella Hampson, 1930
- Veldticola megista Hampson, 1930
- Veldticola nebulosella Hampson, 1930
- Veldticola persinuella Hampson, 1930
- Veldticola striatella Hampson, 1930
- Zitha allutalis (Zeller, 1852)
- Zitha ignalis (Guenée, 1854)
- Zitha laminalis (Guenée, 1854)
- Zitha punicealis Walker, 1866
- Zitha subcupralis (Zeller, 1852)
- Zitha subochracea (Warren, 1897)
- Zophodia ebeniella (Ragonot, 1888)
- Zophodia lignea de Joannis, 1927
