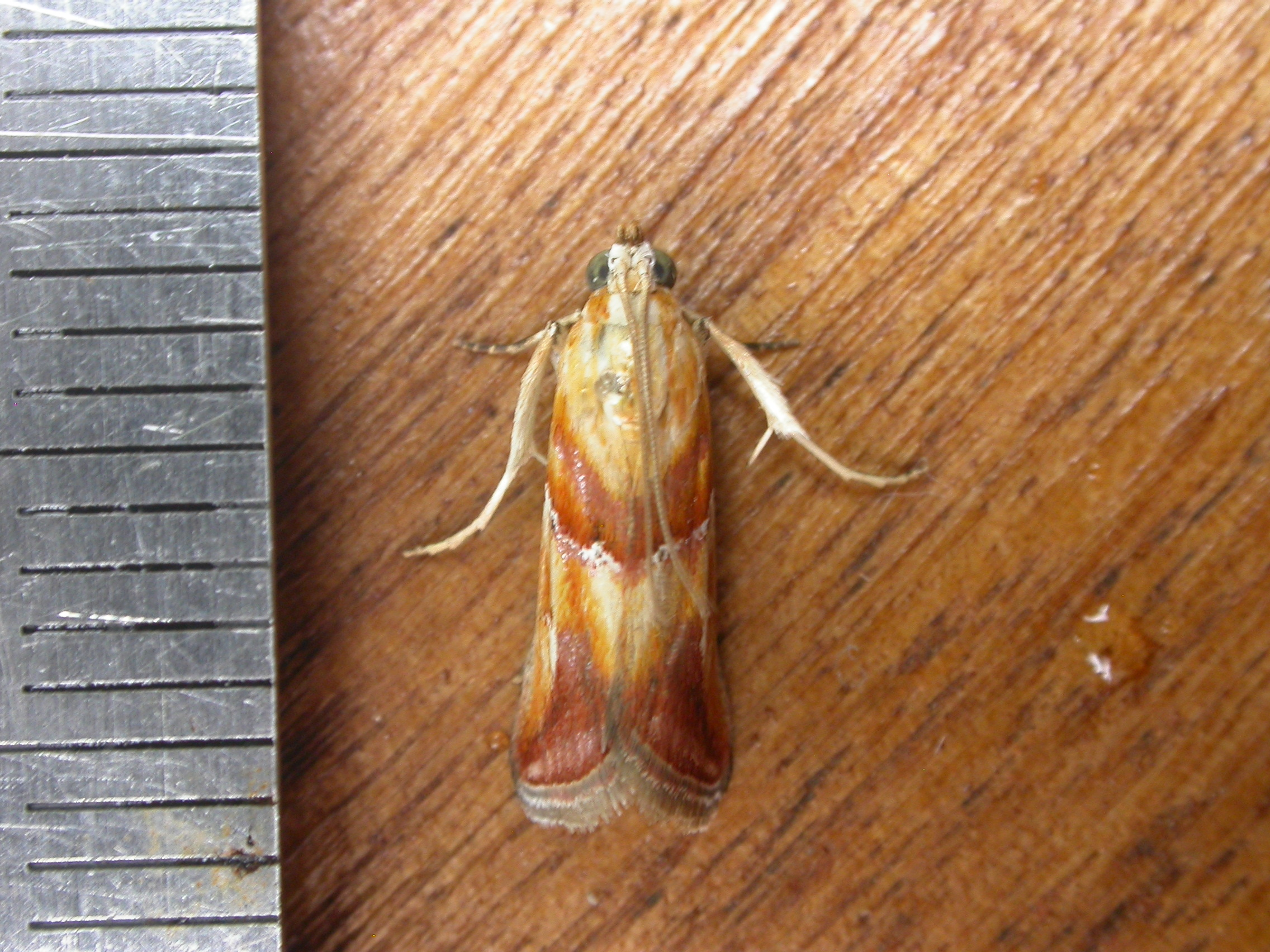
- Epicrocis pulchra

Scientific classification
- Kingdom: Animalia
- Phylum: Arthropoda
- Clade: Pancrustacea
- Class: Insecta
- Order: Lepidoptera
- Family: Pyralidae
- Subfamily: Phycitinae
- Tribe: Phycitini
- Genus: Epicrocis; Zeller, 1848

Synonyms
- Canthelea Walker, 1866; Gabra Walker, 1866

= Epicrocis =

Genus of moths

Epicrocis is a genus of snout moths. It was described by Philipp Christoph Zeller in 1848.

== Species ==
- Epicrocis abbreviata (Balinsky, 1994)
- Epicrocis africanella (Ragonot, 1888)
- Epicrocis albigeralis (Walker, 1865)
- Epicrocis ancylosiformis (Balinsky, 1994)
- Epicrocis anthracanthes Meyrick, 1934
- Epicrocis arcana (Balinsky, 1994)
- Epicrocis atrilinea Horak, 1997
- Epicrocis brevipalpata (Balinsky, 1994)
- Epicrocis complicata (Balinsky, 1994)
- Epicrocis coriacelloides (Balinsky, 1994)
- Epicrocis crassa (Balinsky, 1994)
- Epicrocis ferrealis (Hampson, 1898)
- Epicrocis festivella Zeller, 1848
- Epicrocis flavicosta (Balinsky, 1994)
- Epicrocis furcilinea (Balinsky, 1994)
- Epicrocis gracilis (Balinsky, 1994)
- Epicrocis gratella (Walker, 1863)
- Epicrocis hilarella Ragonot, 1888
- Epicrocis holophaea (Hampson, 1926)
- Epicrocis imitans (Balinsky, 1994)
- Epicrocis insolita (Balinsky, 1994)
- Epicrocis intermedia (Balinsky, 1994)
- Epicrocis laticostella (Ragonot, 1888)
- Epicrocis mesembrina Meyrick, 1887
- Epicrocis metallopa (Lower, 1898)
- Epicrocis nigricans (Ragonot, 1888)
- Epicrocis nigrilinea (de Joannis, 1927)
- Epicrocis nigrinella (Balinsky, 1994)
- Epicrocis noncapillata (Balinsky, 1994)
- Epicrocis oegnusalis (Walker, 1859)
- Epicrocis ornata (Balinsky, 1994)
- Epicrocis ornatella (Balinsky, 1994)
- Epicrocis picta (Balinsky, 1991)
- Epicrocis piliferella (Ragonot, 1888)
- Epicrocis plumbifasciata (Balinsky, 1994)
- Epicrocis poliochyta Turner, 1924
- Epicrocis pseudonatalensis (Balinsky, 1994)
- Epicrocis pulchra Horak, 1997
- Epicrocis punctata (Balinsky, 1994)
- Epicrocis sacculata (Balinsky, 1994)
- Epicrocis sahariensis (Rothschild, 1921)
- Epicrocis signatella Pagenstecher, 1907
- Epicrocis spiculata (Balinsky, 1994)
- Epicrocis stibiella (Snellen, 1872)
- Epicrocis striaticosta (de Joannis, 1927)
- Epicrocis umbratella Pagenstecher, 1907
- Epicrocis vansoni (Balinsky, 1994)
- Epicrocis vicinella (de Joannis, 1927)
