= Epilepia meyi =

Scientific classification
- Kingdom: Animalia
- Phylum: Arthropoda
- Clade: Pancrustacea
- Class: Insecta
- Order: Lepidoptera
- Family: Pyralidae
- Genus: Epilepia
- Species: E. meyi

Binomial name
- Epilepia meyi Speidel, 2007

Species of moth

Epilepia meyi is a species of snout moth in the genus Epilepia. It was described by Speidel in 2007, and is known from Namibia.
