= Morosaphycita interniplagella =

Scientific classification
- Kingdom: Animalia
- Phylum: Arthropoda
- Clade: Pancrustacea
- Class: Insecta
- Order: Lepidoptera
- Family: Pyralidae
- Genus: Morosaphycita
- Species: M. interniplagella

Binomial name
- Morosaphycita interniplagella Ragonot, 1888

Species of moth

Morosaphycita interniplagella is a species of moth in the family Pyralidae. It was described by Émile Louis Ragonot in 1888. This species is sparsely distributed across Africa.
