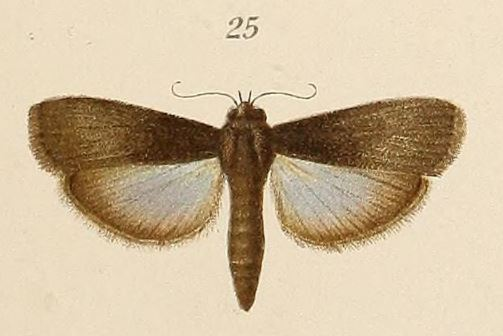

Scientific classification
- Kingdom: Animalia
- Phylum: Arthropoda
- Class: Insecta
- Order: Lepidoptera
- Family: Pyralidae
- Genus: Epicrocis
- Species: E. signatella

Binomial name
- Epicrocis signatella Pagenstecher, 1907

= Epicrocis signatella =

Species of moth

Epicrocis signatella is a species of snout moth in the genus Epicrocis. It was described by Pagenstecher in 1907. It is found in Madagascar.

The adults of this species have a wingspan of 32mm.
