= Epicrocis nigrilinea =

Scientific classification
- Domain: Eukaryota
- Kingdom: Animalia
- Phylum: Arthropoda
- Class: Insecta
- Order: Lepidoptera
- Family: Pyralidae
- Genus: Epicrocis
- Species: E. nigrilinea

Binomial name
- Epicrocis nigrilinea (de Joannis, 1927)

Synonyms
- Ilythia nigrilinea de Joannis, 1927

Species of moth

Epicrocis nigrilinea is a species of snout moth in the genus Epicrocis. It was described by Joseph de Joannis in 1927. It is found in Mozambique.
