= Lorymodes =

Scientific classification
- Kingdom: Animalia
- Phylum: Arthropoda
- Class: Insecta
- Order: Lepidoptera
- Family: Pyralidae
- Subfamily: Pyralinae
- Genus: Lorymodes; Hampson, 1917

Genus of moths

Lorymodes is a genus of snout moths. It was described by George Hampson in 1917.

== Species ==
- Lorymodes australis Viette, 1960
- Lorymodes digonialis (Hampson, 1906)
- Lorymodes stenopteralis Hampson, 1917
