= Epilepia simulata =

Scientific classification
- Domain: Eukaryota
- Kingdom: Animalia
- Phylum: Arthropoda
- Class: Insecta
- Order: Lepidoptera
- Family: Pyralidae
- Genus: Epilepia
- Species: E. simulata

Binomial name
- Epilepia simulata Janse, 1931

Species of moth

Epilepia simulata is a species of snout moth in the genus Epilepia. It is known from northern Nigeria.
