= Commotria phyrdes =

Scientific classification
- Kingdom: Animalia
- Phylum: Arthropoda
- Class: Insecta
- Order: Lepidoptera
- Family: Pyralidae
- Genus: Commotria
- Species: C. phyrdes

Binomial name
- Commotria phyrdes (Dyar, 1914)

Synonyms
- Tinitinoa phyrdes Dyar, 1914

Species of moth

Commotria phyrdes is a species of snout moth in the genus Commotria. It was described by Harrison Gray Dyar Jr. in 1914, and is known from Panama.
