= Lorymodes australis =

Scientific classification
- Kingdom: Animalia
- Phylum: Arthropoda
- Class: Insecta
- Order: Lepidoptera
- Family: Pyralidae
- Genus: Lorymodes
- Species: L. australis

Binomial name
- Lorymodes australis Viette, 1960

Species of moth

Lorymodes australis is a species of snout moth in the genus Lorymodes, described by Pierre Viette in 1960, from Madagascar.
