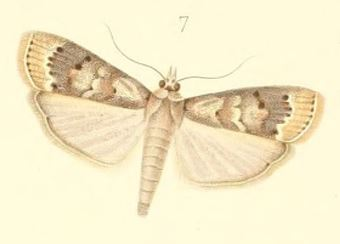
- Mussidia irisella

Scientific classification
- Domain: Eukaryota
- Kingdom: Animalia
- Phylum: Arthropoda
- Class: Insecta
- Order: Lepidoptera
- Family: Pyralidae
- Subfamily: Phycitinae
- Genus: Mussidia; Ragonot, 1888

Type species
- Mussidia nigrivenella Ragonot, 1888

Synonyms
- Muscidia Sharp, 1890 (incorrect subsequent spelling)

= Mussidia =

Genus of moths

Mussidia is a genus of snout moths described by Émile Louis Ragonot in 1888.

== Species ==
- Mussidia fiorii Cecconi & de Joannis, 1911
- Mussidia irisella (Guenée, 1862)
- Mussidia melanoneura Ragonot, 1893
- Mussidia nigrivenella Ragonot, 1888
- Mussidia nigrolineella Roesler & Küppers, 1981
- Mussidia pectinicornella (Hampson, 1896)
- Mussidia physostigmatis Ragonot, 1893
- Mussidia semipectinella (Guenée, 1862)
