= Mittonia carcassoni =

Scientific classification
- Kingdom: Animalia
- Phylum: Arthropoda
- Class: Insecta
- Order: Lepidoptera
- Family: Pyralidae
- Genus: Mittonia
- Species: M. carcassoni

Binomial name
- Mittonia carcassoni Whalley, 1964

Species of moth

Mittonia carcassoni is a species of snout moth, and the type species in the genus Mittonia. It was described by Whalley in 1964, and is known from Uganda (including Entebbe).
