= Heterochrosis =

Scientific classification
- Kingdom: Animalia
- Phylum: Arthropoda
- Class: Insecta
- Order: Lepidoptera
- Family: Pyralidae
- Tribe: Phycitini
- Genus: Heterochrosis; Hampson, 1926

Genus of moths

Heterochrosis is a genus of snout moths. It was described by George Hampson in 1926.

== Species ==
- Heterochrosis molybdophora Lower, 1903
- Heterochrosis oligochrodes Hampson, 1926
