= Commotria venosella =

Scientific classification
- Kingdom: Animalia
- Phylum: Arthropoda
- Clade: Pancrustacea
- Class: Insecta
- Order: Lepidoptera
- Family: Pyralidae
- Genus: Commotria
- Species: C. venosella

Binomial name
- Commotria venosella Hampson, 1918

Species of moth

Commotria venosella is a species of snout moth in the genus Commotria. It was described by George Hampson in 1918 and is known from Malawi.
