= Navasota persectella =

Scientific classification
- Kingdom: Animalia
- Phylum: Arthropoda
- Class: Insecta
- Order: Lepidoptera
- Family: Pyralidae
- Genus: Navasota
- Species: N. persectella

Binomial name
- Navasota persectella Hampson, 1918

Species of moth

Navasota persectella is a species of snout moth in the genus Navasota. It was described by George Hampson in 1918 and is known from Timor (including Dili, the type location).
