= Endolasia =

Scientific classification
- Kingdom: Animalia
- Phylum: Arthropoda
- Class: Insecta
- Order: Lepidoptera
- Family: Pyralidae
- Subfamily: Phycitinae
- Genus: Endolasia; Hampson, 1896

Genus of moths

Endolasia is a genus of snout moths. It was described by George Hampson in 1896.

== Species ==
- Endolasia melanoleuca Hampson, 1896
- Endolasia transvaalica Hampson, 1926
