= Synoria =

Scientific classification
- Domain: Eukaryota
- Kingdom: Animalia
- Phylum: Arthropoda
- Class: Insecta
- Order: Lepidoptera
- Family: Pyralidae
- Tribe: Phycitini
- Genus: Synoria; Ragonot, 1888

Genus of moths

Synoria is a genus of snout moths. It was first described by Ragonot in 1888.

== Species ==
- Synoria antiquella (Herrich-Schäffer, 1855)
- Synoria euglyphella Ragonot, 1888
