= Epicrocis festivella =

Scientific classification
- Kingdom: Animalia
- Phylum: Arthropoda
- Clade: Pancrustacea
- Class: Insecta
- Order: Lepidoptera
- Family: Pyralidae
- Genus: Epicrocis
- Species: E. festivella

Binomial name
- Epicrocis festivella Zeller, 1848

Synonyms
- Gabra tinealella Walker, 1866

Species of moth

Epicrocis festivella is a species of snout moth in the genus Epicrocis. It was described by Zeller in 1848, and is known from Java, Indonesia and Taiwan.
