= Epicrocis sahariensis =

Scientific classification
- Domain: Eukaryota
- Kingdom: Animalia
- Phylum: Arthropoda
- Class: Insecta
- Order: Lepidoptera
- Family: Pyralidae
- Genus: Epicrocis
- Species: E. sahariensis

Binomial name
- Epicrocis sahariensis (Rothschild, 1921)

Synonyms
- Heterographis sahariensis Rothschild, 1921; Pristophora pseudodiscomaculella Amsel, 1935; Epicrocis pseudodiscomaculella

Species of moth

Epicrocis sahariensis is a species of snout moth in the genus Epicrocis. It was described by Rothschild in 1921. It is found in Niger, Ethiopia, Iran, Jordan, the Palestinian Territories and the United Arab Emirates.
