= Metacrateria =

Scientific classification
- Kingdom: Animalia
- Phylum: Arthropoda
- Clade: Pancrustacea
- Class: Insecta
- Order: Lepidoptera
- Family: Pyralidae
- Subfamily: Phycitinae
- Genus: Metacrateria; Hampson, 1918

Genus of moths

Metacrateria is a genus of snout moths described by George Hampson in 1918.

== Species ==
- Metacrateria perirrorella Hampson, 1918
- Metacrateria pulverulella (Hampson, 1896)
