= Aglossodes pineaui =

Scientific classification
- Kingdom: Animalia
- Phylum: Arthropoda
- Clade: Pancrustacea
- Class: Insecta
- Order: Lepidoptera
- Family: Pyralidae
- Genus: Aglossodes
- Species: A. pineaui

Binomial name
- Aglossodes pineaui (Rougeot, 1977)

Synonyms
- Dattinia pineaui Rougeot, 1977

Species of moth

Aglossodes pineaui is a species of snout moth in the genus Aglossodes. It was described by Rougeot, in 1977. It is found in Ethiopia.
