= Navasota myriolecta =

Scientific classification
- Kingdom: Animalia
- Phylum: Arthropoda
- Class: Insecta
- Order: Lepidoptera
- Family: Pyralidae
- Genus: Navasota
- Species: N. myriolecta

Binomial name
- Navasota myriolecta Dyar, 1914

Species of moth

Navasota myriolecta is a species of snout moth in the genus Navasota. It was described by Harrison Gray Dyar Jr. in 1914 and is known from Panama.
