= Neopaschia nigromarginata =

Scientific classification
- Kingdom: Animalia
- Phylum: Arthropoda
- Class: Insecta
- Order: Lepidoptera
- Family: Pyralidae
- Genus: Neopaschia
- Species: N. nigromarginata

Binomial name
- Neopaschia nigromarginata Viette, 1953

Species of moth

Neopaschia nigromarginata is a species of snout moth in the genus Neopaschia. It was described by Viette in 1953, and is known from Madagascar (including Fianarantsoa, the type location).
