= Ceutholopha =

Scientific classification
- Kingdom: Animalia
- Phylum: Arthropoda
- Clade: Pancrustacea
- Class: Insecta
- Order: Lepidoptera
- Family: Pyralidae
- Subfamily: Phycitinae
- Tribe: Phycitini
- Genus: Ceutholopha; Zeller, 1867

Synonyms
- Centolopha Caradja, 1910; Ceutolopha Janse, 1942; Hypophana Meyrick, 1882; Pseudophycitadella , 2007

Genus of moths

Ceutholopha is a genus of snout moths. It was erected by Zeller in 1867, and is known from Africa, Australia and India.

== Species ==
- Ceutholopha isidis (Zeller, 1867)
- Ceutholopha petalocosma (Meyrick, 1882)
