= Metacrateria pulverulella =

Scientific classification
- Kingdom: Animalia
- Phylum: Arthropoda
- Clade: Pancrustacea
- Class: Insecta
- Order: Lepidoptera
- Family: Pyralidae
- Genus: Metacrateria
- Species: M. pulverulella

Binomial name
- Metacrateria pulverulella (Hampson, 1918)

Synonyms
- Anerastia pulverulella Hampson, 1896

Species of moth

Metacrateria pulverulella is a species of snout moth. It was described by George Hampson in 1918. It is found in Sri Lanka.

== Description ==
The wingspan is about 18 millimetres (0.71 in). Frons with a long flattened corneous projection more or less buried in scales. In the male, the head white and brown. Thorax pale brown. Abdomen ochreous. Forewings ochreous, with broad white costal fascia irrorated (sprinkled) with fuscous, tapering to the apex, its lower edge defined by brown. A prominent dark speck found at the lower angle of cell. The veins beyond the cell, vein 1 and inner margin white irrorated with fuscous. Hindwings are whitish.
