= Mussidia pectinicornella =

Scientific classification
- Domain: Eukaryota
- Kingdom: Animalia
- Phylum: Arthropoda
- Class: Insecta
- Order: Lepidoptera
- Family: Pyralidae
- Genus: Mussidia
- Species: M. pectinicornella

Binomial name
- Mussidia pectinicornella (Hampson, 1896)

Synonyms
- Myelois pectinicornella Hampson, 1896; Nephopteryx sagittiferella Moore, 1891

Species of moth

Mussidia pectinicornella is a species of snout moth in the genus Mussidia. It was described by George Hampson in 1896. It is found in southern and south-eastern Asia from Bhutan to New Guinea, in Australia and Fiji, Taiwan, Japan, southern Europe and in Réunion.

Known food plants of this species are citrus fruits, Rutaceae, (Citrus grandis, Citrus species, Citrus limon) and Sapotaceae (Manilkara zapota).
