= Neopaschia lemairei =

Scientific classification
- Kingdom: Animalia
- Phylum: Arthropoda
- Class: Insecta
- Order: Lepidoptera
- Family: Pyralidae
- Genus: Neopaschia
- Species: N. lemairei

Binomial name
- Neopaschia lemairei Viette, 1973

Species of moth

Neopaschia lemairei is a species of snout moth in the genus Neopaschia. It was described by Viette in 1973, and is known from Madagascar.
