= Didia striatella =

Scientific classification
- Kingdom: Animalia
- Phylum: Arthropoda
- Class: Insecta
- Order: Lepidoptera
- Family: Pyralidae
- Genus: Didia
- Species: D. striatella

Binomial name
- Didia striatella (Inoue, 1959)

Synonyms
- Apomyelois striatella Inoue, 1959

Species of moth

Didia striatella is a species of snout moth in the genus Didia. It was described by Hiroshi Inoue in 1959. It is found in Japan.

The wingspan is 9–11 mm (0.35–0.43 in).
