= Myelodes =

Scientific classification
- Kingdom: Animalia
- Phylum: Arthropoda
- Class: Insecta
- Order: Lepidoptera
- Family: Pyralidae
- Subfamily: Phycitinae
- Genus: Myelodes; Hampson, 1930

Genus of moths

Myelodes is a genus of snout moths described by George Hampson in 1930.

== Species ==
- Myelodes flavimargo Hampson, 1930
- Myelodes jansei Hampson, 1930
