= Epicrocis anthracanthes =

Scientific classification
- Kingdom: Animalia
- Phylum: Arthropoda
- Class: Insecta
- Order: Lepidoptera
- Family: Pyralidae
- Genus: Epicrocis
- Species: E. anthracanthes

Binomial name
- Epicrocis anthracanthes Meyrick, 1934

Species of moth

Epicrocis anthracanthes is a species of snout moth in the genus Epicrocis. It was described by Edward Meyrick in 1934 and is known from Cyprus.
