= Commotria enervella =

Scientific classification
- Kingdom: Animalia
- Phylum: Arthropoda
- Class: Insecta
- Order: Lepidoptera
- Family: Pyralidae
- Genus: Commotria
- Species: C. enervella

Binomial name
- Commotria enervella Hampson, 1918

Species of moth

Commotria enervella is a species of snout moth in the genus Commotria. It was described by George Hampson in 1918 and is known from Taiwan.
