= Navasota discipunctella =

Scientific classification
- Kingdom: Animalia
- Phylum: Arthropoda
- Class: Insecta
- Order: Lepidoptera
- Family: Pyralidae
- Genus: Navasota
- Species: N. discipunctella

Binomial name
- Navasota discipunctella Hampson, 1918

Species of moth

Navasota discipunctella is a species of snout moth in the genus Navasota. It was described by George Hampson in 1918 and is known from Nigeria (including Minna, the type location).
