= Epicrocis mesembrina =

Scientific classification
- Kingdom: Animalia
- Phylum: Arthropoda
- Clade: Pancrustacea
- Class: Insecta
- Order: Lepidoptera
- Family: Pyralidae
- Genus: Epicrocis
- Species: E. mesembrina

Binomial name
- Epicrocis mesembrina Meyrick, 1887

Species of moth

Epicrocis mesembrina is a species of snout moth in the genus Epicrocis. It was described by Edward Meyrick in 1887 and is known from Australia.
