= Eucarphia hemityrella =

Scientific classification
- Domain: Eukaryota
- Kingdom: Animalia
- Phylum: Arthropoda
- Class: Insecta
- Order: Lepidoptera
- Family: Pyralidae
- Genus: Eucarphia
- Species: E. hemityrella

Binomial name
- Eucarphia hemityrella (de Joannis, 1927)

Synonyms
- Argyrorhabda hemityrella de Joannis, 1927

Species of moth

Eucarphia hemityrella is a species of snout moth in the genus Eucarphia. It was described by Joseph de Joannis in 1927 and is known from Mozambique.
