= Neopaschia =

Scientific classification
- Kingdom: Animalia
- Phylum: Arthropoda
- Class: Insecta
- Order: Lepidoptera
- Family: Pyralidae
- Subfamily: Epipaschiinae
- Genus: Neopaschia; Janse, 1922

Genus of moths

Neopaschia is a genus of snout moths. It was described by Anthonie Johannes Theodorus Janse in 1922.

== Species ==
- Neopaschia flavociliata Janse, 1922
- Neopaschia lemairei Viette, 1973
- Neopaschia nigromarginata Viette, 1953
