= Aglossodes rougeoti =

Scientific classification
- Kingdom: Animalia
- Phylum: Arthropoda
- Clade: Pancrustacea
- Class: Insecta
- Order: Lepidoptera
- Family: Pyralidae
- Genus: Aglossodes
- Species: A. rougeoti

Binomial name
- Aglossodes rougeoti Leraut, 2009

Species of moth

Aglossodes rougeoti is a species of snout moth in the genus Aglossodes. It was described by Patrice J.A. Leraut in 2009 and is known from Kenya.
