= Mussidia fiorii =

Scientific classification
- Domain: Eukaryota
- Kingdom: Animalia
- Phylum: Arthropoda
- Class: Insecta
- Order: Lepidoptera
- Family: Pyralidae
- Genus: Mussidia
- Species: M. fiorii

Binomial name
- Mussidia fiorii Cecconi & de Joannis, 1911

Species of moth

Mussidia fiorii is a species of snout moth in the genus Mussidia. It was described by G. Cecconi and Joseph de Joannis in 1911 and is known from Eritrea.
