= Didia fuscostriatella =

Scientific classification
- Kingdom: Animalia
- Phylum: Arthropoda
- Class: Insecta
- Order: Lepidoptera
- Family: Pyralidae
- Genus: Didia
- Species: D. fuscostriatella

Binomial name
- Didia fuscostriatella Yamanaka, 2006

Species of moth

Didia fuscostriatella is a species of snout moth in the genus Didia. It was described by Hiroshi Yamanaka in 2006 and is known from Japan.

The wingspan is 8–10 millimetres (0.31–0.39 in).

The larvae feed on Bauhinia japonica.
