= Commotria ruficolor =

Scientific classification
- Kingdom: Animalia
- Phylum: Arthropoda
- Class: Insecta
- Order: Lepidoptera
- Family: Pyralidae
- Genus: Commotria
- Species: C. ruficolor

Binomial name
- Commotria ruficolor Janse, 1922

Species of moth

Commotria ruficolor is a species of snout moth in the genus Commotria. It was described by Anthonie Johannes Theodorus Janse in 1922. It is found in Zimbabwe.
