= Heterochrosis molybdophora =

Scientific classification
- Domain: Eukaryota
- Kingdom: Animalia
- Phylum: Arthropoda
- Class: Insecta
- Order: Lepidoptera
- Family: Pyralidae
- Genus: Heterochrosis
- Species: H. molybdophora

Binomial name
- Heterochrosis molybdophora Lower, 1903

Synonyms
- Heterographis molybdophora Lower, 1903; Cateremna mediolinea Turner, 1947

Species of moth

Heterochrosis molybdophora is a species of snout moth in the genus Heterochrosis. It was described by Oswald Bertram Lower in 1903. It is found in Australia.
