= Ceutholopha petalocosma =

Scientific classification
- Kingdom: Animalia
- Phylum: Arthropoda
- Class: Insecta
- Order: Lepidoptera
- Family: Pyralidae
- Genus: Ceutholopha
- Species: C. petalocosma

Binomial name
- Ceutholopha petalocosma (Meyrick, 1882)

Synonyms
- Hypophana petalocosma Meyrick, 1882; Phycita atimeta Turner, 1904; Spatulipalpia sophronica Turner, 1904

Species of moth

Ceutholopha petalocosma is a species of snout moth in the genus Ceutholopha. It was described by Edward Meyrick in 1882 and is known from Australia.
