= Synoria antiquella =

Scientific classification
- Domain: Eukaryota
- Kingdom: Animalia
- Phylum: Arthropoda
- Class: Insecta
- Order: Lepidoptera
- Family: Pyralidae
- Genus: Synoria
- Species: S. antiquella

Binomial name
- Synoria antiquella (Herrich-Schaffer, 1855)

Synonyms
- Zophodia antiquella Herrich-Schaffer, 1855

Species of moth

Synoria antiquella is a species of snout moth. It is found in Greece and Turkey.
