= Endolasia melanoleuca =

Scientific classification
- Domain: Eukaryota
- Kingdom: Animalia
- Phylum: Arthropoda
- Class: Insecta
- Order: Lepidoptera
- Family: Pyralidae
- Genus: Endolasia
- Species: E. melanoleuca

Binomial name
- Endolasia melanoleuca Hampson, 1896

Species of moth

Endolasia melanoleuca is a species of snout moth in the genus Endolasia. It was described by George Hampson in 1896. It is found in India.
