= Commotria invenustella =

Scientific classification
- Kingdom: Animalia
- Phylum: Arthropoda
- Class: Insecta
- Order: Lepidoptera
- Family: Pyralidae
- Genus: Commotria
- Species: C. invenustella

Binomial name
- Commotria invenustella Berg, 1885

Species of moth

Commotria invenustella is a species of snout moth in the genus Commotria. It was described by Carlos Berg in 1885. It is found in Argentina and Uruguay.
