= Commotria rosella =

Scientific classification
- Kingdom: Animalia
- Phylum: Arthropoda
- Class: Insecta
- Order: Lepidoptera
- Family: Pyralidae
- Genus: Commotria
- Species: C. rosella

Binomial name
- Commotria rosella Hampson, 1918

Species of moth

Commotria rosella is a species of snout moth in the genus Commotria. It was first described by George Hampson in 1918, and is known from Malawi.

== Appearance ==
Adults of Commotria rosella have bright rose-pink forewings, pale ochre hindwings, and a wingspan of 22 to 26 mm.
