= Eucarphia =

Scientific classification
- Kingdom: Animalia
- Phylum: Arthropoda
- Clade: Pancrustacea
- Class: Insecta
- Order: Lepidoptera
- Family: Pyralidae
- Subfamily: Phycitinae
- Tribe: Phycitini
- Genus: Eucarphia; Hübner, 1825

Synonyms
- Argyrodes Guenée, 1845; Agyrodes Scudder, 1882; Argyrorhabda Hampson, 1926

Genus of moths

Eucarphia is a genus of snout moths. It was described by Jacob Hübner in 1825.

== Species ==
- Eucarphia anomala Balinsky, 1994
- Eucarphia hemityrella (de Joannis, 1927)
- Eucarphia leucomera (Hampson, 1926)
- Eucarphia resectella (Werneburg, 1865)
- Eucarphia vinetella (Fabricius, 1787)
