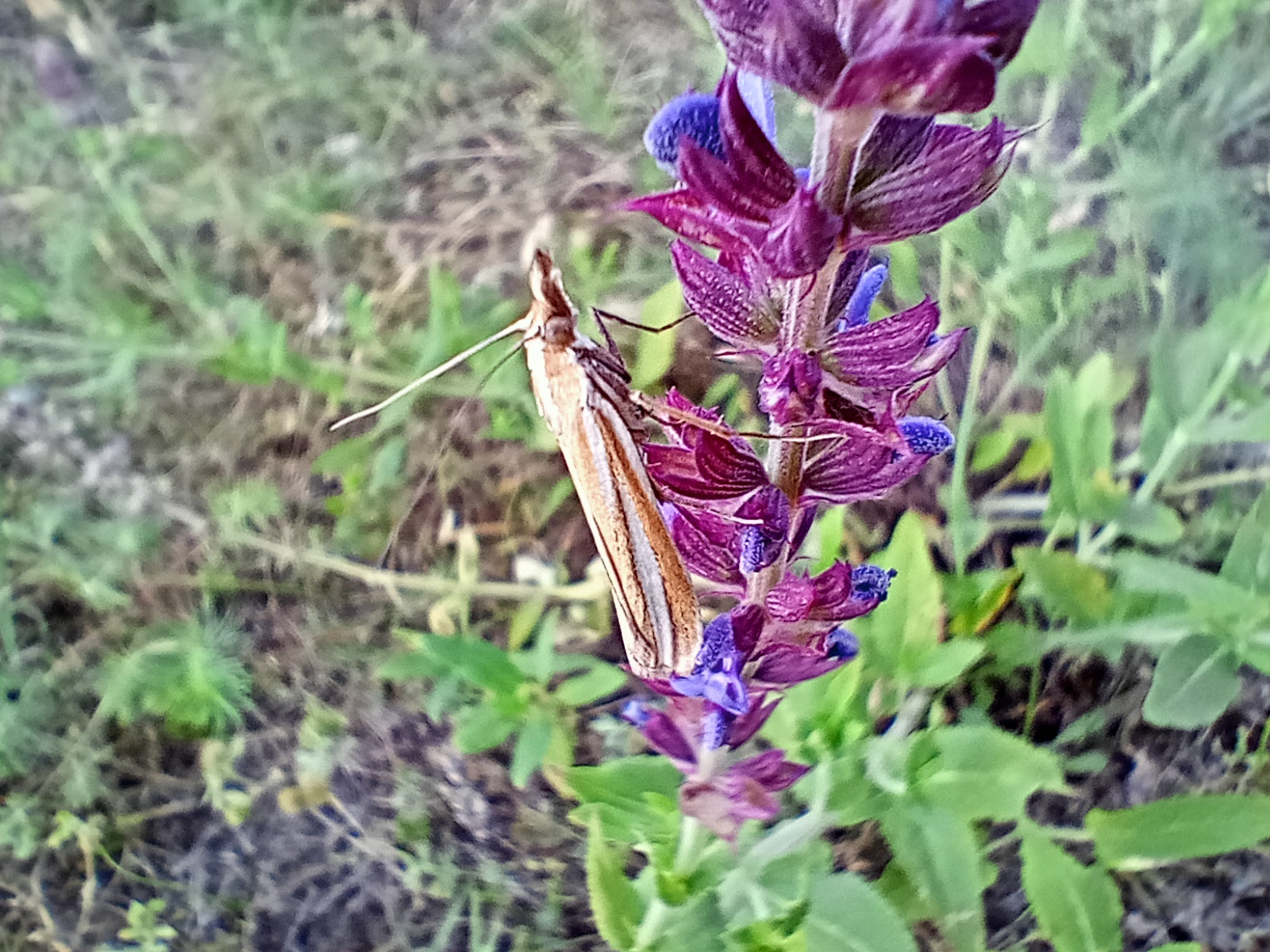
- Eucarphia vinetella, Hungary

Scientific classification
- Kingdom: Animalia
- Phylum: Arthropoda
- Class: Insecta
- Order: Lepidoptera
- Family: Pyralidae
- Genus: Eucarphia
- Species: E. vinetella

Binomial name
- Eucarphia vinetella (Fabricius, 1787)

Synonyms
- Eucarphia vinetorum Fabricius, 1798; Tinea vinetella Fabricius, 1787

= Eucarphia vinetella =

Species of moth

Eucarphia vinetella is a species of grass moth in the family Pyralidae. It is found in the Palearctic.
