= Aglossodes =

Scientific classification
- Kingdom: Animalia
- Phylum: Arthropoda
- Clade: Pancrustacea
- Class: Insecta
- Order: Lepidoptera
- Family: Pyralidae
- Subfamily: Pyralinae
- Genus: Aglossodes; Ragonot, 1891

Genus of moths

Aglossodes is a genus of snout moths. It was described by Ragonot, in 1891. It is known from Sierra Leone, South Africa, and Kenya.

== Species ==
- Aglossodes duveti (Rougeot, 1977)
- Aglossodes mocquerysi (Leraut, 2009)
- Aglossodes navattae (Rougeot, 1977)
- Aglossodes pineaui (Rougeot, 1977)
- Aglossodes prionophoralis (Ragonot, 1891)
- Aglossodes rougeoti (Leraut, 2009)
