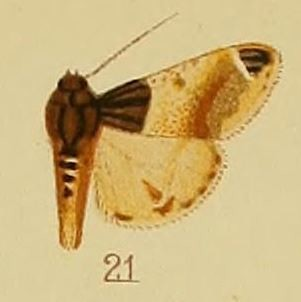
- Epilepia melanobasis

Scientific classification
- Kingdom: Animalia
- Phylum: Arthropoda
- Class: Insecta
- Order: Lepidoptera
- Family: Pyralidae
- Subfamily: Epipaschiinae
- Genus: Epilepia; Janse, 1931

= Epilepia =

Genus of moths

Epilepia is a genus of snout moths (family Pyralidae). It was described by Anthonie Johannes Theodorus Janse in 1931.

== Species ==
- Epilepia dentatum
- Epilepia melanobasis (Hampson, 1906)
- Epilepia melanobrunnea (Janse, 1922)
- Epilepia melanosparsalis Janse, 1922
- Epilepia meyi Speidel, 2007
- Epilepia melapastalis (Hampson, 1906)
- Epilepia simulata Janse, 1931
