= Epicrocis atrilinea =

Scientific classification
- Kingdom: Animalia
- Phylum: Arthropoda
- Clade: Pancrustacea
- Class: Insecta
- Order: Lepidoptera
- Family: Pyralidae
- Genus: Epicrocis
- Species: E. atrilinea

Binomial name
- Epicrocis atrilinea Horak, 1997

Species of moth

Epicrocis atrilinea is a species of snout moth in the genus Epicrocis. It was described by Marianne Horak in 1997 and is known from Queensland in Australia.
