= Mussidia physostigmatis =

Scientific classification
- Domain: Eukaryota
- Kingdom: Animalia
- Phylum: Arthropoda
- Class: Insecta
- Order: Lepidoptera
- Family: Pyralidae
- Genus: Mussidia
- Species: M. physostigmatis

Binomial name
- Mussidia physostigmatis Ragonot, 1893

Species of moth

Mussidia physostigmatis is a species of snout moth in the genus Mussidia. It was described by Ragonot in 1893, and is known from Nigeria.
