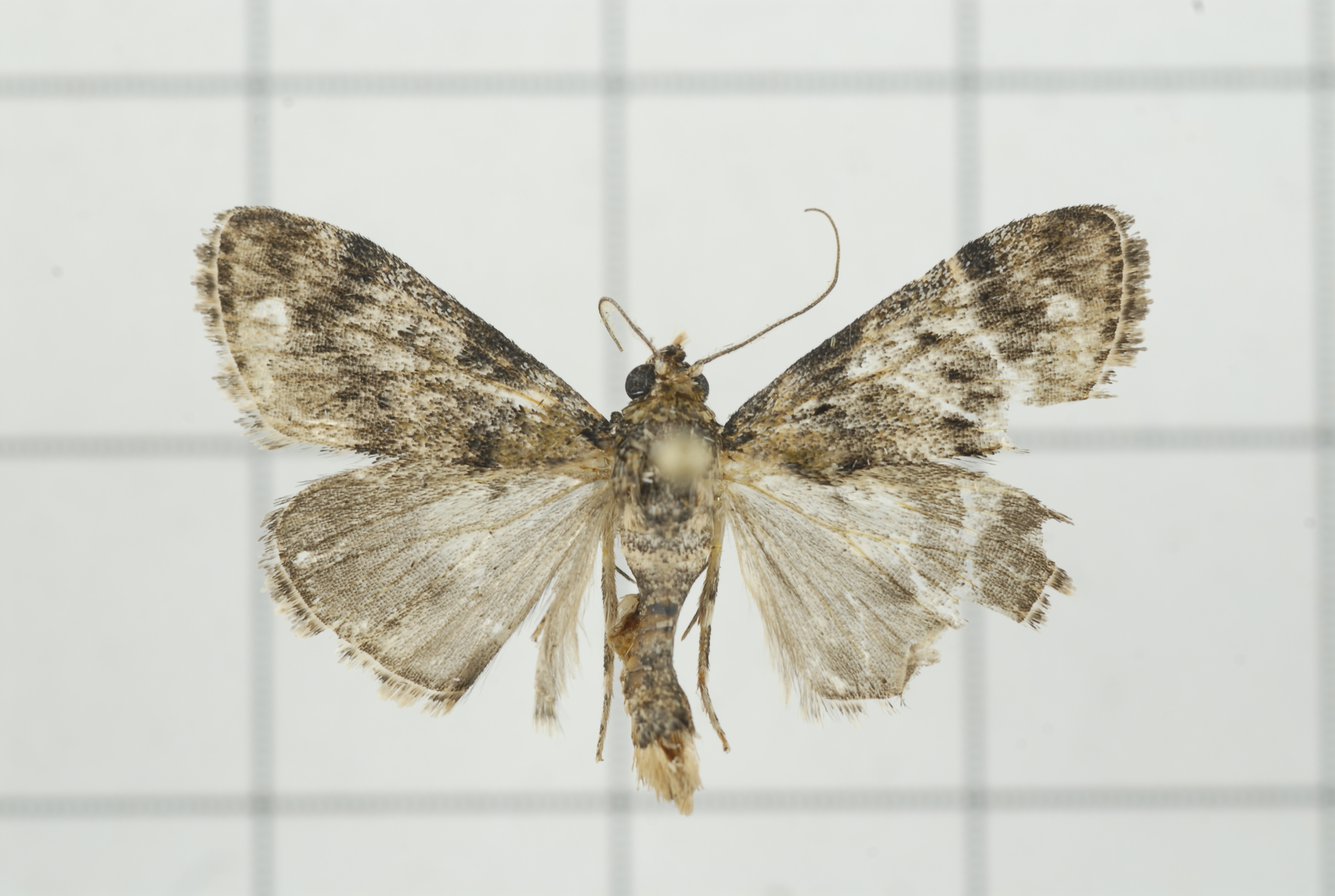

Scientific classification
- Domain: Eukaryota
- Kingdom: Animalia
- Phylum: Arthropoda
- Class: Insecta
- Order: Lepidoptera
- Family: Pyralidae
- Genus: Epilepia
- Species: E. dentatum

Binomial name
- Epilepia dentatum Matsumura & Shibuya, 1927

= Epilepia dentatum =

Species of moth

Epilepia dentatum is a species of snout moth in the genus Epilepia. It is known from Japan (the type location is Kyoto) and Taiwan.
