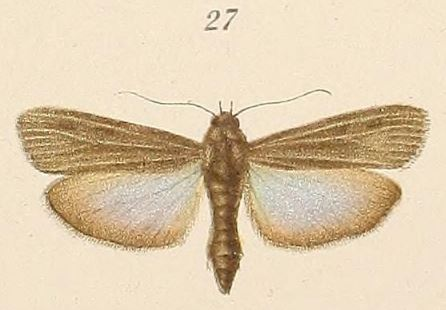

Scientific classification
- Kingdom: Animalia
- Phylum: Arthropoda
- Class: Insecta
- Order: Lepidoptera
- Family: Pyralidae
- Genus: Epicrocis
- Species: E. umbratella

Binomial name
- Epicrocis umbratella Pagenstecher, 1907

= Epicrocis umbratella =

Species of moth

Epicrocis umbratella is a species of snout moth in the genus Epicrocis. It was described by Pagenstecher in 1907. It is found in Madagascar.
