= Navasota hebetella =

Scientific classification
- Kingdom: Animalia
- Phylum: Arthropoda
- Class: Insecta
- Order: Lepidoptera
- Family: Pyralidae
- Genus: Navasota
- Species: N. hebetella

Binomial name
- Navasota hebetella Ragonot, 1887

Species of moth

Navasota hebetella is a species of snout moth in the genus Navasota. It was described by Émile Louis Ragonot in 1887 and is found in North America, including Texas.
