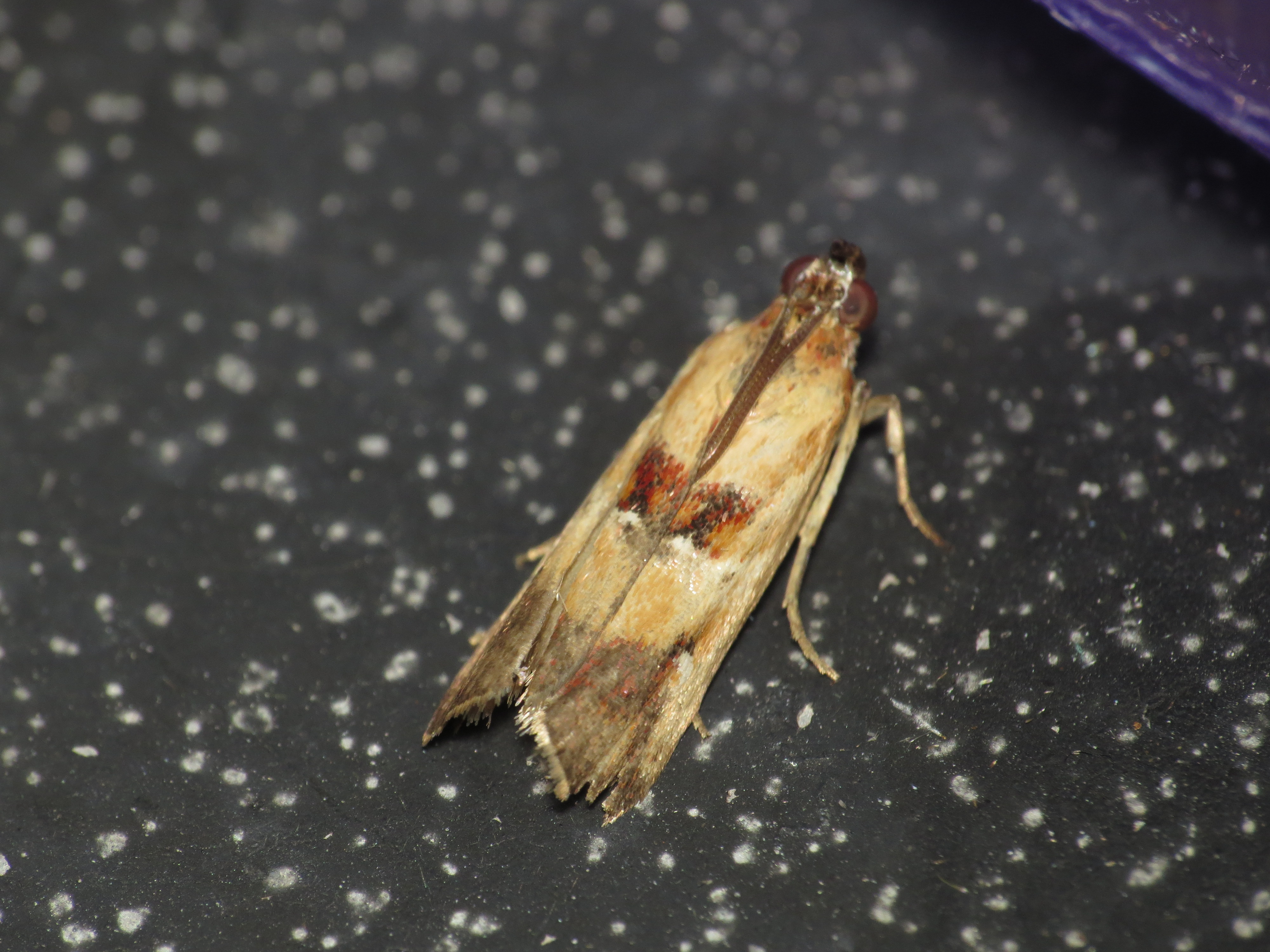

Scientific classification
- Kingdom: Animalia
- Phylum: Arthropoda
- Clade: Pancrustacea
- Class: Insecta
- Order: Lepidoptera
- Family: Pyralidae
- Genus: Epicrocis
- Species: E. metallopa

Binomial name
- Epicrocis metallopa (Lower, 1898)

Synonyms
- Cetermna metallopa Lower, 1898

= Epicrocis metallopa =

Species of moth

Epicrocis metallopa is a species of snout moth in the genus Epicrocis. It was described by Oswald Bertram Lower in 1898 and it is known from Australia.

The wingspan is about 20 mm. The forewings are orange with black markings.
