= Commotria albistria =

Scientific classification
- Kingdom: Animalia
- Phylum: Arthropoda
- Clade: Pancrustacea
- Class: Insecta
- Order: Lepidoptera
- Family: Pyralidae
- Genus: Commotria
- Species: C. albistria

Binomial name
- Commotria albistria Janse, 1922

Species of moth

Commotria albistria is a species of snout moth in the genus Commotria. It was described by Anthonie Johannes Theodorus Janse in 1922. It is found in Zimbabwe.
