= Didia (moth) =

Scientific classification
- Kingdom: Animalia
- Phylum: Arthropoda
- Class: Insecta
- Order: Lepidoptera
- Family: Pyralidae
- Tribe: Phycitini
- Genus: Didia; Ragonot, 1893

Genus of moths

Didia is a genus of snout moths. It was described by Ragonot in 1893.

== Species ==
- Didia diehli Roesler & Küppers, 1981
- Didia fuscostriatella Yamanaka, 2006
- Didia striatella (Inoue, 1959)
- Didia subramosella Ragonot, 1893
