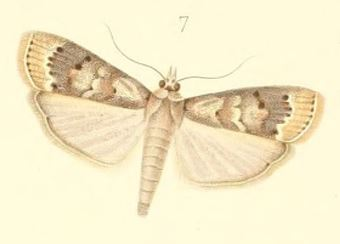

Scientific classification
- Kingdom: Animalia
- Phylum: Arthropoda
- Class: Insecta
- Order: Lepidoptera
- Family: Pyralidae
- Genus: Mussidia
- Species: M. irisella

Binomial name
- Mussidia irisella (Guenée, 1862)

Synonyms
- Phycis irisella Guenée, 1862

= Mussidia irisella =

Species of moth

Mussidia irisella is a species of snout moth in the genus Mussidia. It was described by Achille Guenée in 1862 and is known from Réunion and Mauritius.
