= Epicrocis gratella =

Scientific classification
- Kingdom: Animalia
- Phylum: Arthropoda
- Class: Insecta
- Order: Lepidoptera
- Family: Pyralidae
- Genus: Epicrocis
- Species: E. gratella

Binomial name
- Epicrocis gratella (Walker, 1863)

Synonyms
- Homoeosoma gratella Walker, 1863

Species of moth

Epicrocis gratella is a species of snout moth in the genus Epicrocis. It was described by Francis Walker in 1863 and is known from Sri Lanka.
