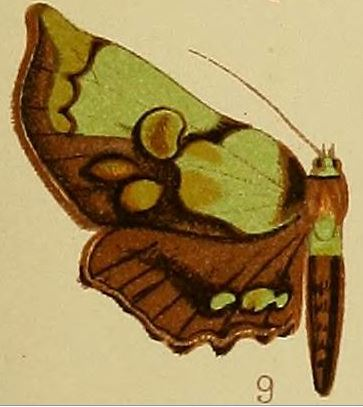
- Mittonia hampsoni

Scientific classification
- Kingdom: Animalia
- Phylum: Arthropoda
- Class: Insecta
- Order: Lepidoptera
- Family: Pyralidae
- Subfamily: Pyralinae
- Genus: Mittonia; Whalley, 1964

= Mittonia =

Genus of moths

Mittonia is a genus of snout moths described by Paul Ernest Sutton Whalley in 1964.

== Species ==
- Mittonia carcassoni Whalley, 1964
- Mittonia hampsoni (Distant, 1897)
