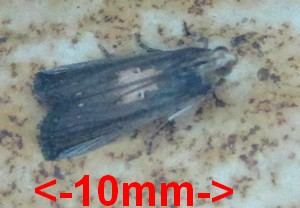
- Morosaphycita morosalis
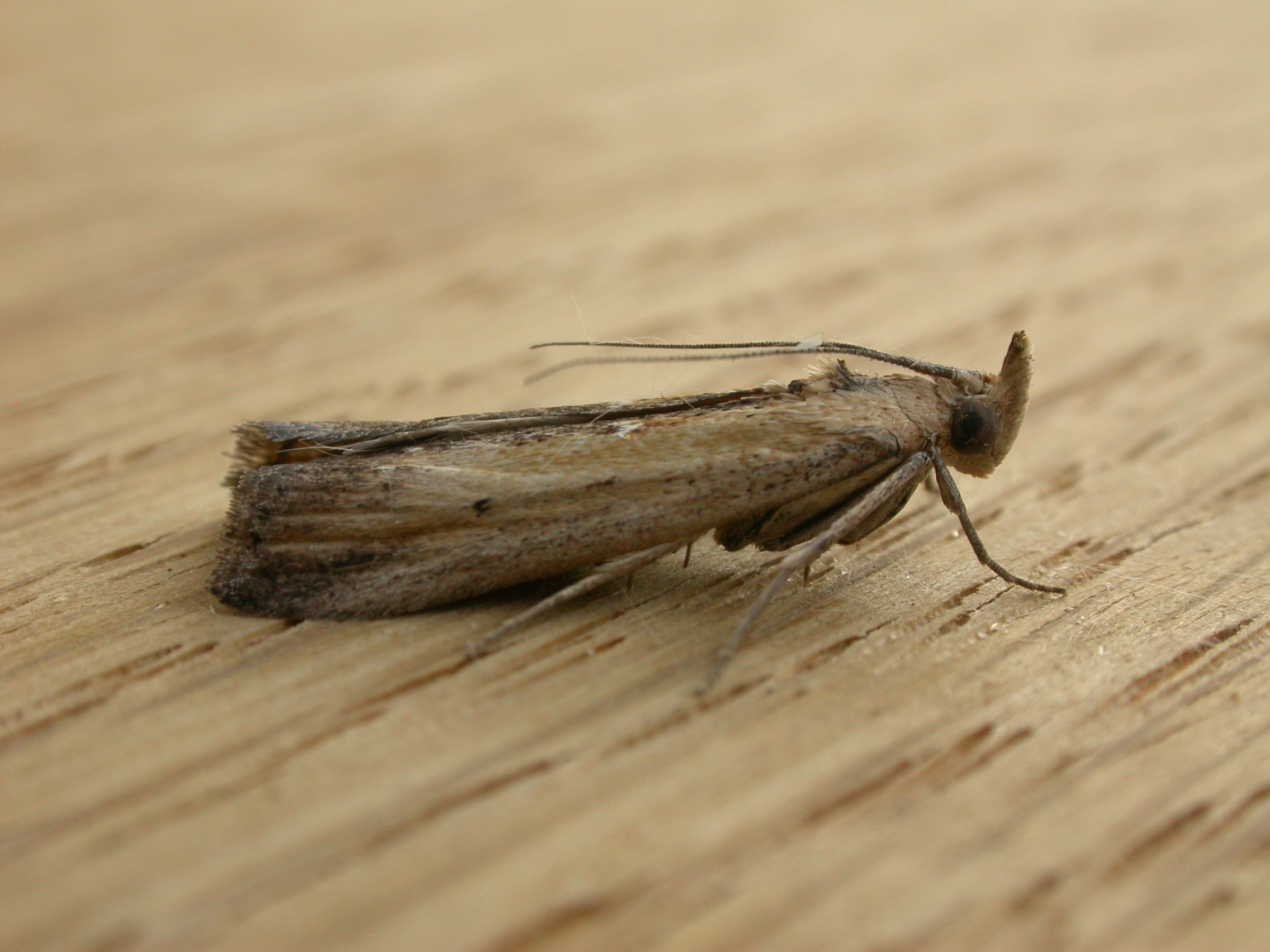
- Morosaphycita oculiferella

Scientific classification
- Kingdom: Animalia
- Phylum: Arthropoda
- Class: Insecta
- Order: Lepidoptera
- Family: Pyralidae
- Subfamily: Phycitinae
- Genus: Morosaphycita; Horak, 1997

= Morosaphycita =

Genus of moths

Morosaphycita is a genus of Pyralidae, subfamily Phycitinae. The species of this genus are only known from Africa and Australia/Oriental region.

== Species ==
- Morosaphycita cirtensis (Ragonot, 1890)
- Morosaphycita cleopatrella (Ragonot, 1887)
- Morosaphycita dibursella Leraut G., 2019
- Morosaphycita dubia (Balinsky, 1994) (Balinsky, 1994)
- Morosaphycita interniplagella (Ragonot, 1888) (Ragonot, 1888)
- Morosaphycita modesta (Balinsky, 1994) (Balinsky, 1994)
- Morosaphycita morosalis (Saalmüller, 1880)
- Morosaphycita oculiferella (Meyrick, 1879)
- Morosaphycita tridens Horak, 1997 (Queensland)
- Morosaphycita maculata (Staudinger, 1876) (Korea)
- Morosaphycita bispinosa Horak, 1997 (Australia)
- Morosaphycita poliochyta (from Australia)

There remain a number of unplaced species, as:

- Morosaphycita cornutella (Amsel, 1951)
- Morosaphycita asbolalis
- Morosaphycita c-album
- Morosaphycita orthosiella
