= Commotria =

Scientific classification
- Kingdom: Animalia
- Phylum: Arthropoda
- Class: Insecta
- Order: Lepidoptera
- Family: Pyralidae
- Tribe: Anerastiini
- Genus: Commotria; Berg, 1885

Synonyms
- Tinitinoa Dyar, 1914; Commatria Berg, 1885

Genus of moths

Commotria is a genus of snout moths. It was described by Carlos Berg in 1885.

== Species ==
- Commotria albinervella Hampson, 1918
- Commotria albistria Janse, 1922
- Commotria castaneipars Hampson, 1918
- Commotria enervella Hampson, 1918
- Commotria invenustella Berg, 1885
- Commotria leucosparsalis Janse, 1922
- Commotria mesiella Hampson, 1918
- Commotria phlebicella Hampson, 1918
- Commotria phoenicias Hampson, 1918
- Commotria phyrdes (Dyar, 1914)
- Commotria prohaeella Hampson, 1918
- Commotria rhodoneura Hampson, 1918
- Commotria rosella Hampson, 1918
- Commotria ruficolor Janse, 1922
- Commotria rufidelineata Hampson, 1918
- Commotria tripartella Hampson, 1918
- Commotria venosella Hampson, 1918
