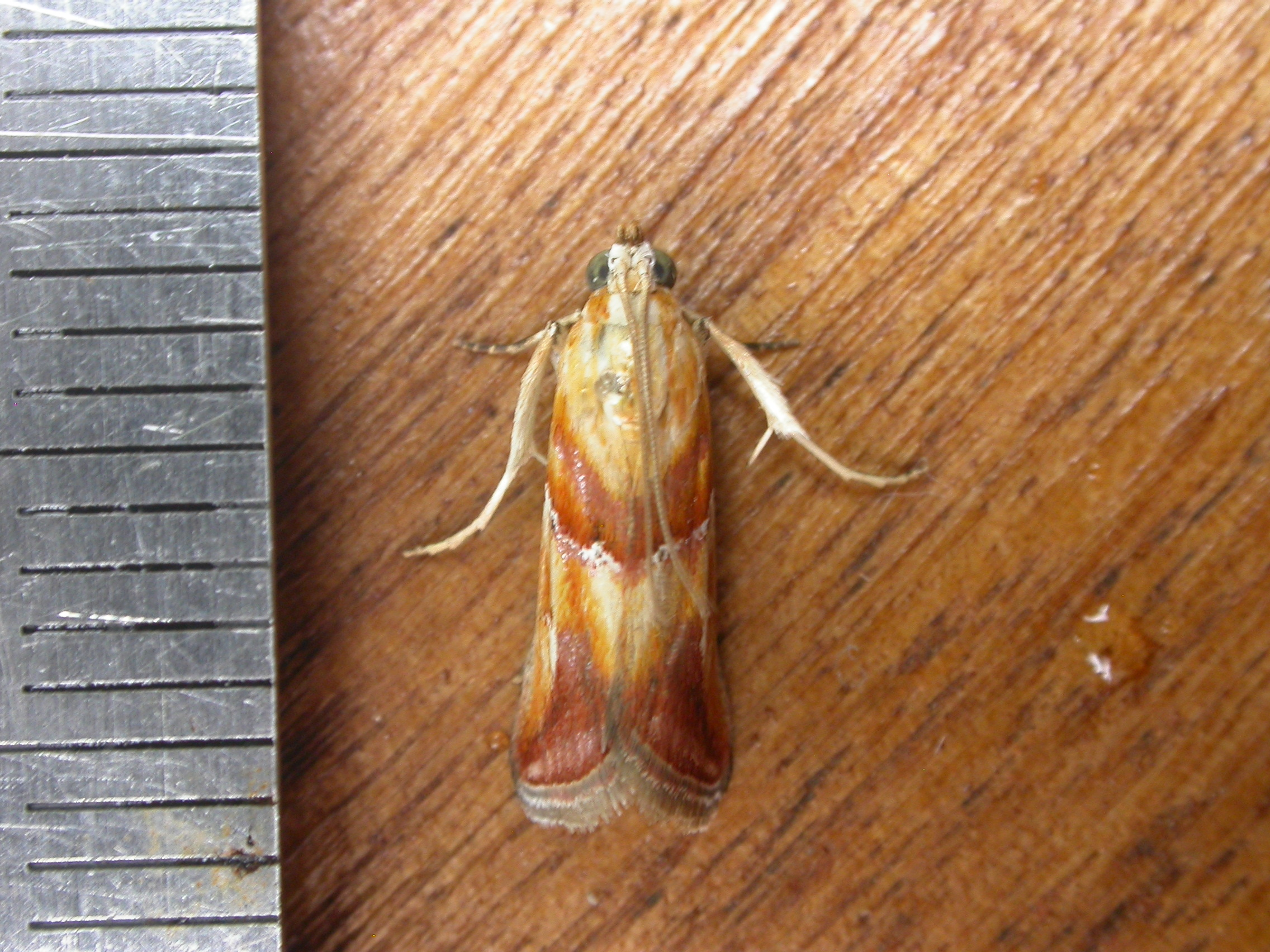

Scientific classification
- Kingdom: Animalia
- Phylum: Arthropoda
- Clade: Pancrustacea
- Class: Insecta
- Order: Lepidoptera
- Family: Pyralidae
- Genus: Epicrocis
- Species: E. pulchra

Binomial name
- Epicrocis pulchra Horak, 1997

= Epicrocis pulchra =

Species of moth

Epicrocis pulchra is a species of snout moth in the genus Epicrocis. It was described by Marianne Horak in 1997 and is known from Queensland, Australia.
