= Didia diehli =

Scientific classification
- Kingdom: Animalia
- Phylum: Arthropoda
- Class: Insecta
- Order: Lepidoptera
- Family: Pyralidae
- Genus: Didia
- Species: D. diehli

Binomial name
- Didia diehli Roesler & Küppers, 1981

Species of moth

Didia diehli is a species of snout moth in the genus Didia. It was described by Roesler and Küppers, in 1981, and is known from northern Sumatra.
