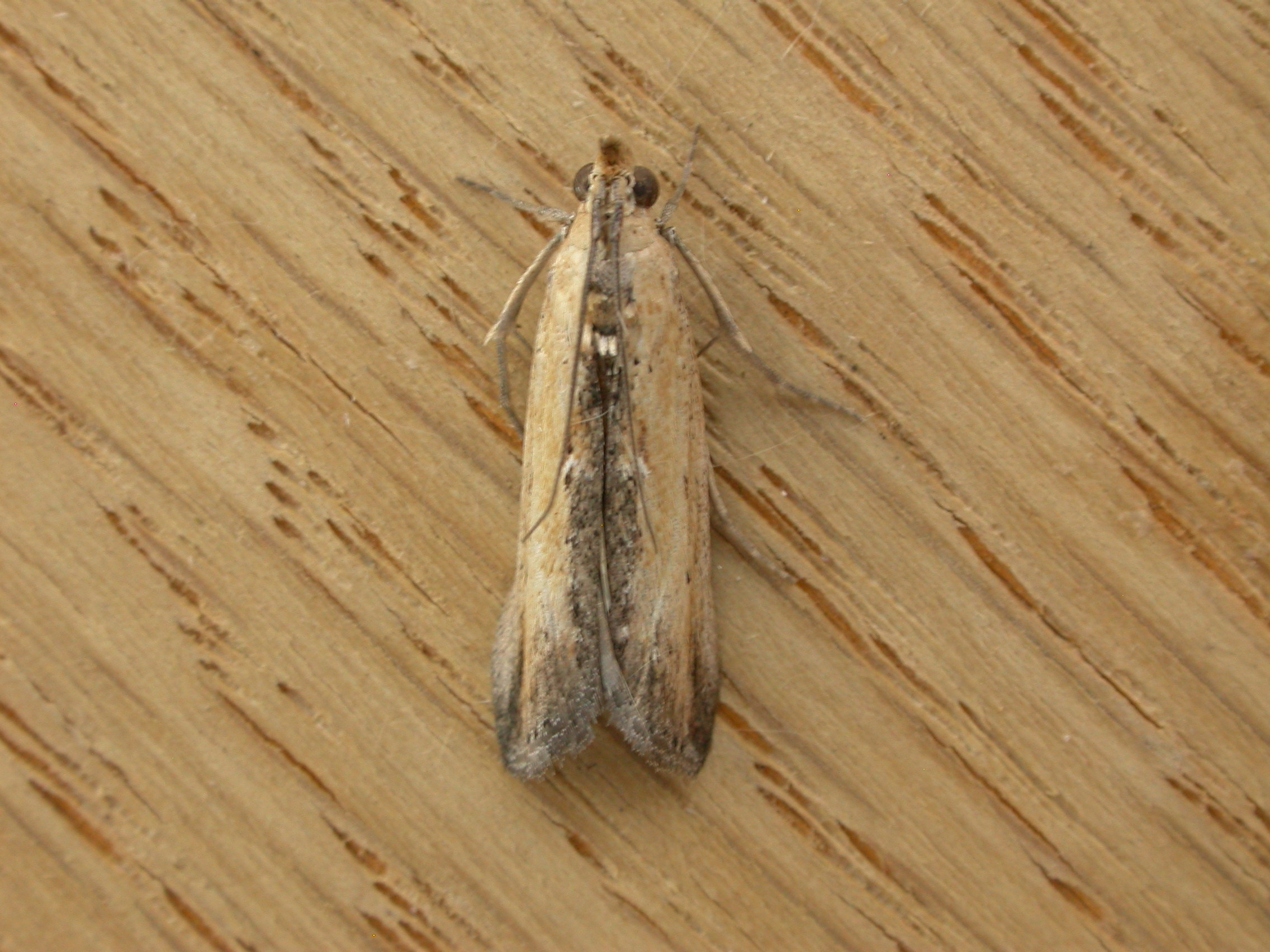

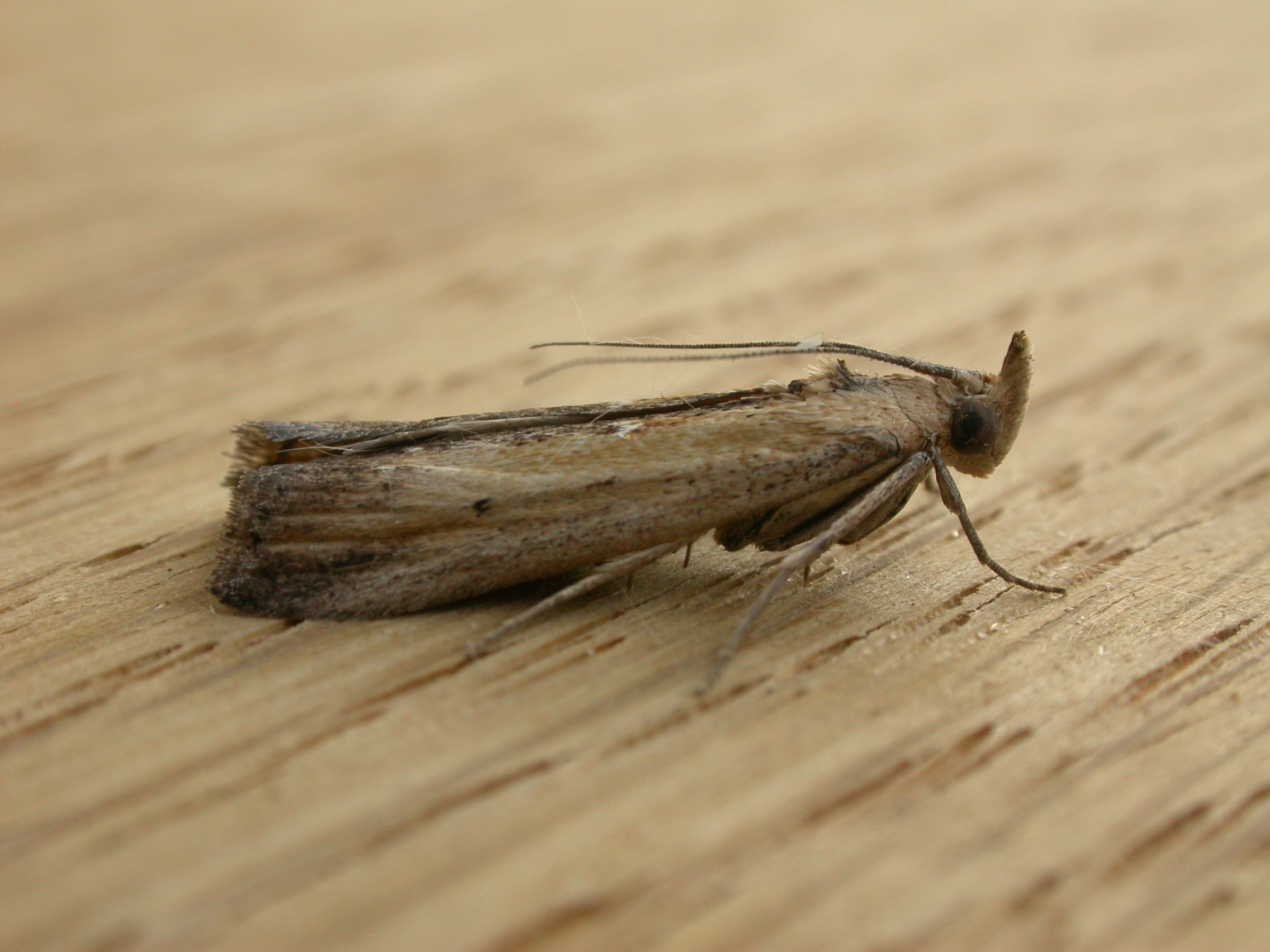

Scientific classification
- Kingdom: Animalia
- Phylum: Arthropoda
- Class: Insecta
- Order: Lepidoptera
- Family: Pyralidae
- Genus: Morosaphycita
- Species: M. oculiferella

Binomial name
- Morosaphycita oculiferella (Meyrick, 1879)

Synonyms
- Pempelia oculiferella Meyrick, 1879; Oligochroa oculiferella (Meyrick, 1879; Salebria sublignalis

= Morosaphycita oculiferella =

Species of moth

Morosaphycita oculiferella is a moth of the family Pyralidae described by Edward Meyrick in 1879. It is known from Australia (including Queensland and the Australian Capital Territory) and New Zealand.

The wingspan is about 20 mm.

This species was discussed and illustrated by George Hudson in his book A supplement to the butterflies and moths of New Zealand.
