= Getulia (moth) =

Scientific classification
- Domain: Eukaryota
- Kingdom: Animalia
- Phylum: Arthropoda
- Class: Insecta
- Order: Lepidoptera
- Family: Pyralidae
- Subfamily: Phycitinae
- Genus: Getulia; Ragonot, 1888

Genus of moths

Getulia is a genus of snout moths described by Émile Louis Ragonot in 1888.

== Species ==
- Getulia fulviplagella Hampson, 1901
- Getulia institella Ragonot, 1888
- Getulia maculosa Balinsky, 1994
- Getulia semifuscella Ragonot, 1893
