= Aglossodes navattae =

Scientific classification
- Kingdom: Animalia
- Phylum: Arthropoda
- Clade: Pancrustacea
- Class: Insecta
- Order: Lepidoptera
- Family: Pyralidae
- Genus: Aglossodes
- Species: A. navattae

Binomial name
- Aglossodes navattae (Rougeot, 1977)

Synonyms
- Dattinia navattae Rougeot, 1977

Species of moth

Aglossodes navattae is a species of snout moth in the genus Aglossodes. It was described by Rougeot, in 1977. It is found in Ethiopia.
