= Eucarphia resectella =

Scientific classification
- Kingdom: Animalia
- Phylum: Arthropoda
- Class: Insecta
- Order: Lepidoptera
- Family: Pyralidae
- Genus: Eucarphia
- Species: E. resectella

Binomial name
- Eucarphia resectella (Werneburg, 1865)

Synonyms
- Tinea (Eucarphia) resectella Werneburg, 1865

Species of moth

Eucarphia resectella is a species of snout moth in the genus Eucarphia. It was described by Adolf Werneburg in 1865 from Germany.

== Taxonomy ==
The generic placement and status of the species is unknown. The species has been overlooked since its original description. According to the original description, it could be a member of the genus Anerastia, possibly Anerastia lotella.
