= Mussidia nigrolineella =

Scientific classification
- Domain: Eukaryota
- Kingdom: Animalia
- Phylum: Arthropoda
- Class: Insecta
- Order: Lepidoptera
- Family: Pyralidae
- Genus: Mussidia
- Species: M. nigrolineella

Binomial name
- Mussidia nigrolineella Roesler & Küppers, 1981

Species of moth

Mussidia nigrolineella is a species of snout moth in the genus Mussidia. It was described by Roesler and Küppers in 1981, and is known from Sumatra, Indonesia.
