= Navasota (moth) =

Scientific classification
- Kingdom: Animalia
- Phylum: Arthropoda
- Class: Insecta
- Order: Lepidoptera
- Family: Pyralidae
- Tribe: Anerastiini
- Genus: Navasota; Ragonot, 1887

Genus of moth

Navasota is a genus of snout moths described by Émile Louis Ragonot in 1887.

== Species ==
- Navasota chionophlebia Hampson, 1918
- Navasota discipunctella Hampson, 1918
- Navasota haemaphaeella Hampson, 1918
- Navasota hebetella Ragonot, 1887
- Navasota leuconeurella Hampson, 1918
- Navasota myriolecta Dyar, 1914
- Navasota persectella Hampson, 1918
- Navasota syriggia Hampson, 1918
