= Epicrocis ferrealis =

Scientific classification
- Kingdom: Animalia
- Phylum: Arthropoda
- Class: Insecta
- Order: Lepidoptera
- Family: Pyralidae
- Genus: Epicrocis
- Species: E. ferrealis

Binomial name
- Epicrocis ferrealis (Hampson, 1898)

Synonyms
- Nephopteryx ferrealis Hampson, 1898

Species of moth

Epicrocis ferrealis is a species of snout moth in the genus Epicrocis. It was described by George Hampson in 1898. It is found in South Africa and Sudan.
