= Myelodes flavimargo =

Scientific classification
- Kingdom: Animalia
- Phylum: Arthropoda
- Clade: Pancrustacea
- Class: Insecta
- Order: Lepidoptera
- Family: Pyralidae
- Genus: Myelodes
- Species: M. flavimargo

Binomial name
- Myelodes flavimargo Hampson, 1930

Species of moth

Myelodes flavimargo is a species of snout moth in the genus Myelodes. It was described by George Hampson in 1930. It is found in Lesotho and South Africa.
