= Epilepia melapastalis =

Scientific classification
- Kingdom: Animalia
- Phylum: Arthropoda
- Class: Insecta
- Order: Lepidoptera
- Family: Pyralidae
- Genus: Epilepia
- Species: E. melapastalis

Binomial name
- Epilepia melapastalis Hampson, 1906

Synonyms
- Salma melapastalis (Hampson, 1906)

Species of moth

Epilepia melapastalis is a species of snout moth in the genus Epilepia. It was described by George Hampson in 1906, and it is known from Réunion, Mozambique, South Africa and Zimbabwe.
