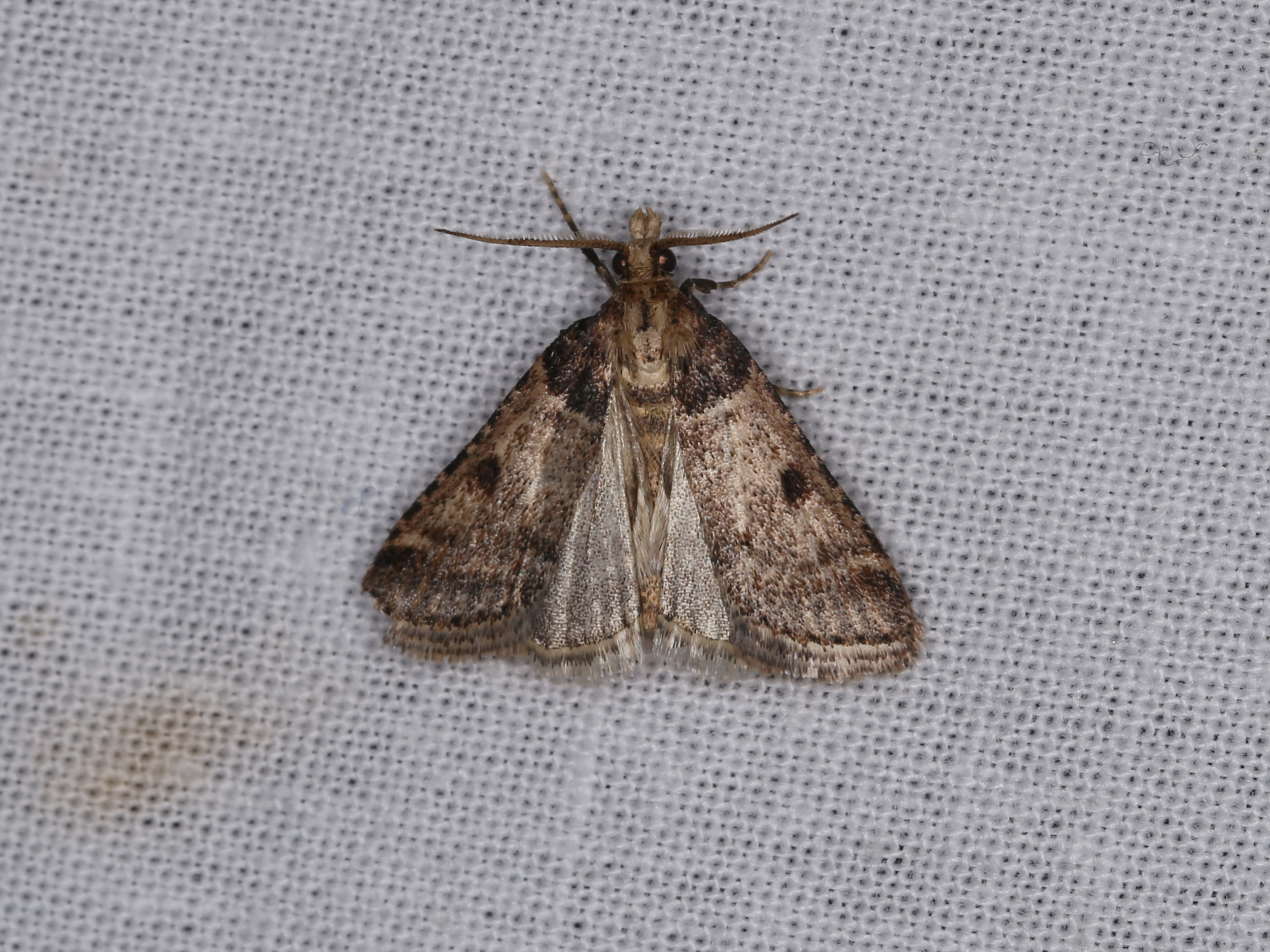

Scientific classification
- Kingdom: Animalia
- Phylum: Arthropoda
- Class: Insecta
- Order: Lepidoptera
- Family: Pyralidae
- Genus: Loryma
- Species: L. basalis

Binomial name
- Loryma basalis (Walker, 1865)

Synonyms
- Aglossa basalis Walker, 1865; Anobostra signaticosta de Joannis, 1927; Essina atribasalis Ragonot, 1891; Philotis punctilimbalis Ragonot, 1891; Philotis punctilimbalis f. aldabrensis Legrand, 1966; Philotis radamalis pyrosalis Legrand, 1966; Pyralis dentibasalis Warren, 1914

= Loryma basalis =

Species of moth

Loryma basalis is a moth species in the family Pyralidae, first described by Francis Walker in 1865. This species is found in Rwanda, South Africa, Mozambique and the Seychelles.
