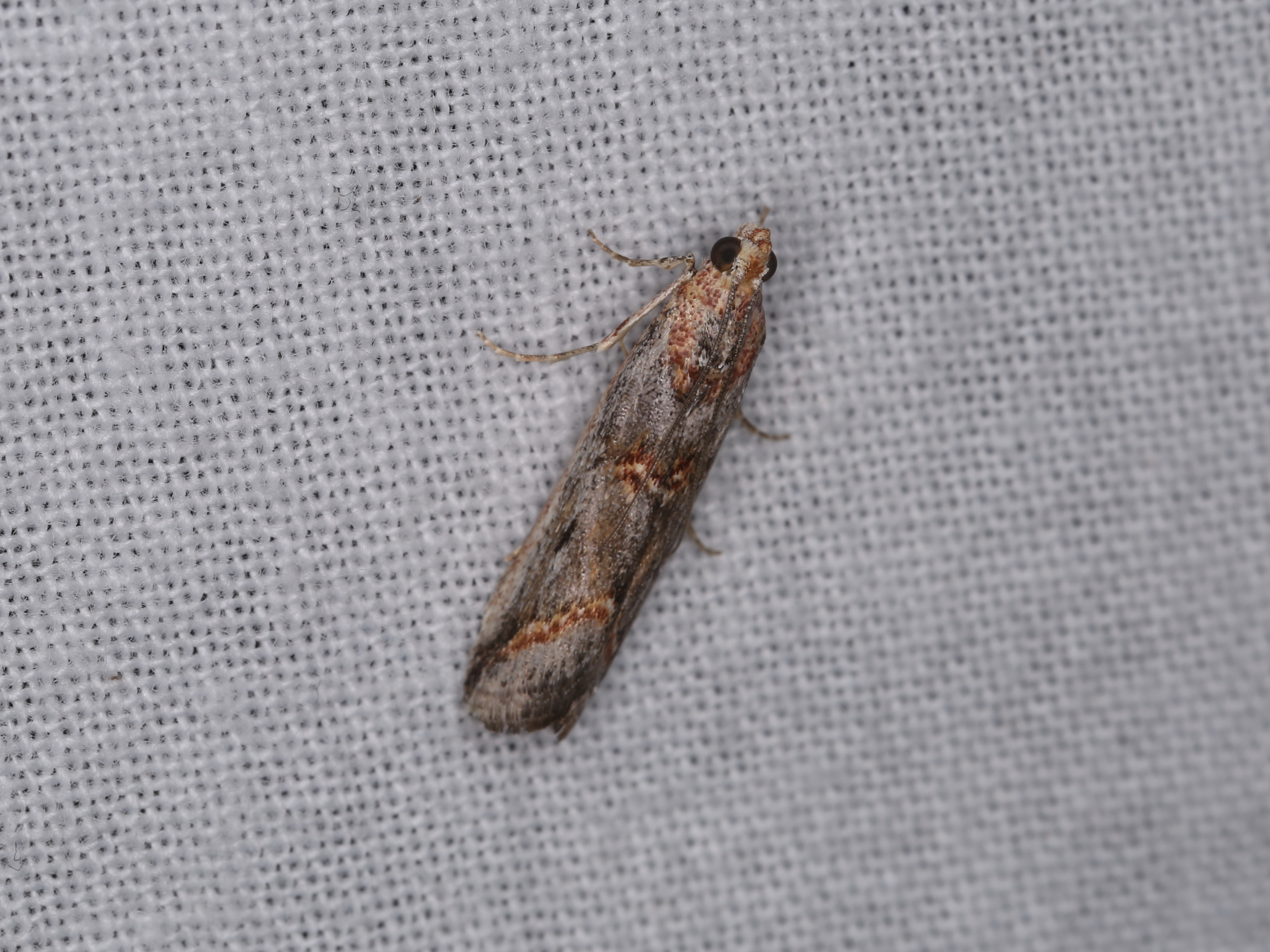

Scientific classification
- Kingdom: Animalia
- Phylum: Arthropoda
- Class: Insecta
- Order: Lepidoptera
- Family: Pyralidae
- Genus: Morosaphycita
- Species: M. poliochyta

Binomial name
- Morosaphycita poliochyta (Turner, 1924)

Synonyms
- Epicrocis poliochyta Turner, 1924

= Morosaphycita poliochyta =

Species of moth

Morosaphycita poliochyta is a moth of the family Pyralidae, subfamily Phycitinae. It is found in Australia.
