= Epilepia melanobrunnea =

Scientific classification
- Domain: Eukaryota
- Kingdom: Animalia
- Phylum: Arthropoda
- Class: Insecta
- Order: Lepidoptera
- Family: Pyralidae
- Genus: Epilepia
- Species: E. melanobrunnea

Binomial name
- Epilepia melanobrunnea (Janse, 1922)

Synonyms
- Macalla melanobrunnea Janse, 1922

Species of moth

Epilepia melanobrunnea is a species of snout moth in the genus Epilepia. It was described by Anthonie Johannes Theodorus Janse in 1922, and it is known from South Africa, Namibia and Zimbabwe.
