= Epilepia melanosparsalis =

Scientific classification
- Domain: Eukaryota
- Kingdom: Animalia
- Phylum: Arthropoda
- Class: Insecta
- Order: Lepidoptera
- Family: Pyralidae
- Genus: Epilepia
- Species: E. melanosparsalis

Binomial name
- Epilepia melanosparsalis (Janse, 1922)

Synonyms
- Macalla melanosparsalis Janse, 1922; Macalla confusa Janse, 1922

Species of moth

Epilepia melanosparsalis is a species of snout moth in the genus Epilepia. It was described by Anthonie Johannes Theodorus Janse in 1922 and is known from South Africa and Zimbabwe.
