= Getulia institella =

Scientific classification
- Domain: Eukaryota
- Kingdom: Animalia
- Phylum: Arthropoda
- Class: Insecta
- Order: Lepidoptera
- Family: Pyralidae
- Genus: Getulia
- Species: G. institella

Binomial name
- Getulia institella Ragonot, 1888

Species of moth

Getulia institella is a species of snout moth. It was described by Ragonot in 1888. It is found in South Africa and Gambia.
