= Parematheudes polystictella =

Scientific classification
- Kingdom: Animalia
- Phylum: Arthropoda
- Clade: Pancrustacea
- Class: Insecta
- Order: Lepidoptera
- Family: Pyralidae
- Genus: Parematheudes
- Species: P. polystictella

Binomial name
- Parematheudes polystictella Hampson, 1918

Synonyms
- Commotria rufimedia Hampson, 1918; Hypsotropa polystictella Hampson, 1918; Parematheudes polystictellus

Species of moth

Parematheudes polystictella is a species of snout moth in the genus Parematheudes. It was described by George Hampson in 1918 and is known from Malawi and South Africa.
