= Commotria leucosparsalis =

Scientific classification
- Kingdom: Animalia
- Phylum: Arthropoda
- Class: Insecta
- Order: Lepidoptera
- Family: Pyralidae
- Genus: Commotria
- Species: C. leucosparsalis

Binomial name
- Commotria leucosparsalis Janse, 1922

Species of moth

Commotria leucosparsalis is a species of snout moth in the genus Commotria. It was described by Anthonie Johannes Theodorus Janse in 1922. It is found in South Africa.
