= Commotria phlebicella =

Scientific classification
- Kingdom: Animalia
- Phylum: Arthropoda
- Class: Insecta
- Order: Lepidoptera
- Family: Pyralidae
- Genus: Commotria
- Species: C. phlebicella

Binomial name
- Commotria phlebicella Hampson, 1918

Species of moth

Commotria phlebicella is a species of snout moth in the genus Commotria. It was described by George Hampson in 1918, and is known from Zimbabwe and South Africa.
