= Commotria castaneipars =

Scientific classification
- Kingdom: Animalia
- Phylum: Arthropoda
- Clade: Pancrustacea
- Class: Insecta
- Order: Lepidoptera
- Family: Pyralidae
- Genus: Commotria
- Species: C. castaneipars

Binomial name
- Commotria castaneipars Hampson, 1918

Species of moth

Commotria castaneipars is a species of snout moth in the genus Commotria. It was described by George Hampson in 1918 and is known from Malawi and South Africa.
