= Epicrocis stibiella =

Scientific classification
- Kingdom: Animalia
- Phylum: Arthropoda
- Class: Insecta
- Order: Lepidoptera
- Family: Pyralidae
- Genus: Epicrocis
- Species: E. stibiella

Binomial name
- Epicrocis stibiella (Snellen, 1872)

Synonyms
- Myelois stibiella Snellen, 1872

Species of moth

Epicrocis stibiella is a species of snout moth in the genus Epicrocis. It was described by Pieter Cornelius Tobias Snellen in 1872. It is found in the Democratic Republic of the Congo and South Africa.
