= Epicrocis nigricans =

Scientific classification
- Domain: Eukaryota
- Kingdom: Animalia
- Phylum: Arthropoda
- Class: Insecta
- Order: Lepidoptera
- Family: Pyralidae
- Genus: Epicrocis
- Species: E. nigricans

Binomial name
- Epicrocis nigricans (Ragonot, 1888)

Synonyms
- Nephopteryx nigricans Ragonot, 1888; Epicrocis (Canthelea) nigricans (Ragonot, 1888)

Species of moth

Epicrocis nigricans is a species of snout moth, family Pyralidae. It was described by Émile Louis Ragonot in 1888. It is known from Ghana and Mozambique.
