= Heterochrosis oligochrodes =

Scientific classification
- Kingdom: Animalia
- Phylum: Arthropoda
- Class: Insecta
- Order: Lepidoptera
- Family: Pyralidae
- Genus: Heterochrosis
- Species: H. oligochrodes

Binomial name
- Heterochrosis oligochrodes Hampson, 1926

Species of moth

Heterochrosis oligochrodes is a species of snout moth in the genus Heterochrosis. It was described by George Hampson in 1926. It is found in South Africa.
