= Lorymodes digonialis =

Scientific classification
- Kingdom: Animalia
- Phylum: Arthropoda
- Class: Insecta
- Order: Lepidoptera
- Family: Pyralidae
- Genus: Lorymodes
- Species: L. digonialis

Binomial name
- Lorymodes digonialis (Hampson, 1917)

Synonyms
- Pyralis digonialis Hampson, 1917

Species of moth

Lorymodes digonialis is a species of snout moth in the genus Lorymodes. It was described by George Hampson in 1917 and is the type species of its genus. It is known from Lesotho and the Eastern Cape in South Africa.
