= Eucarphia leucomera =

Scientific classification
- Kingdom: Animalia
- Phylum: Arthropoda
- Class: Insecta
- Order: Lepidoptera
- Family: Pyralidae
- Genus: Eucarphia
- Species: E. leucomera

Binomial name
- Eucarphia leucomera (Hampson, 1926)

Synonyms
- Argyrorhabda leucomera Hampson, 1926

Species of moth

Eucarphia leucomera is a species of snout moth in the genus Eucarphia. It was described by George Hampson in 1926. It is found in South Africa.
