= Metacrateria perirrorella =

Scientific classification
- Kingdom: Animalia
- Phylum: Arthropoda
- Class: Insecta
- Order: Lepidoptera
- Family: Pyralidae
- Genus: Metacrateria
- Species: M. perirrorella

Binomial name
- Metacrateria perirrorella Hampson, 1918

Species of moth

Metacrateria perirrorella is a species of snout moth. It was described by George Hampson in 1918 and is found in South Africa.
