= Ceutholopha isidis =

Scientific classification
- Kingdom: Animalia
- Phylum: Arthropoda
- Clade: Pancrustacea
- Class: Insecta
- Order: Lepidoptera
- Family: Pyralidae
- Genus: Ceutholopha
- Species: C. isidis

Binomial name
- Ceutholopha isidis (Zeller, 1867)

Synonyms
- Nephopteryx isidis Zeller, 1867; Pseudophycitadella leveuleuxi Guillermet 2007; Phycita calycoptila Meyrick, 1935; Salebria cirrhodelta Meyrick, 1933; Phycita gilvibasella Ragonot, 1888

Species of moth

Ceutholopha isidis is a species of snout moth in the genus Ceutholopha. It was described by Zeller in 1867, and is known from Algeria, Cyprus, Egypt, India, Pakistan, Sri Lanka, Afghanistan, Congo, Indonesia, Iran, Italy (Lampedusa), Mauritius, Morocco, Namibia, Nigeria, Réunion, South Africa, Sudan and the United Arab Emirates. One specimen was caught on 18 August 2012, at Dymchurch, England by J. E. Owen. The moth is either an adventive, or a possible immigrant because it arrived during a period of immigration.

The larvae feed on Acacia farnesiana, Acacia tortilis, Rhus oxyacantha and Acacia nilotica.
