= Eucarphia anomala =

Scientific classification
- Domain: Eukaryota
- Kingdom: Animalia
- Phylum: Arthropoda
- Class: Insecta
- Order: Lepidoptera
- Family: Pyralidae
- Genus: Eucarphia
- Species: E. anomala

Binomial name
- Eucarphia anomala Balinsky, 1994

Species of moth

Eucarphia anomala is a species of snout moth in the genus Eucarphia. It was described by Boris Balinsky in 1994 and is found in South Africa.
