= Epicrocis holophaea =

Scientific classification
- Kingdom: Animalia
- Phylum: Arthropoda
- Class: Insecta
- Order: Lepidoptera
- Family: Pyralidae
- Genus: Epicrocis
- Species: E. holophaea

Binomial name
- Epicrocis holophaea (Hampson, 1926)

Synonyms
- Heterochrosis holophaea Hampson, 1926

Species of moth

Epicrocis holophaea is a species of snout moth in the genus Epicrocis. It was described by George Hampson in 1926. It is found in South Africa.
