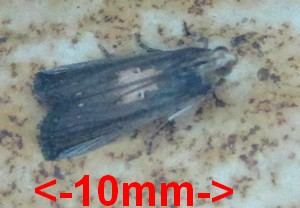

Scientific classification
- Kingdom: Animalia
- Phylum: Arthropoda
- Clade: Pancrustacea
- Class: Insecta
- Order: Lepidoptera
- Family: Pyralidae
- Genus: Morosaphycita
- Species: M. morosalis

Binomial name
- Morosaphycita morosalis (Saalmüller, 1880)

Synonyms
- Myelois morosalis Saalmüller, 1880; Pempelia morosalis

= Morosaphycita morosalis =

Species of moth

Morosaphycita morosalis is a moth of the family Pyralidae. It lives throughout Eastern Africa from Egypt to South Africa, including the Indian Ocean islands and in India and Nepal.

It has a length of approx. 10 millimetres (0.39 in) and a wingspan of around 20 millimetres (0.79 in).

The larvae are considered a pest to Jatropha curcas, a species in the family Euphorbiaceae, eating its flowers and young fruits.
