= Commotria albinervella =

Scientific classification
- Kingdom: Animalia
- Phylum: Arthropoda
- Class: Insecta
- Order: Lepidoptera
- Family: Pyralidae
- Genus: Commotria
- Species: C. albinervella

Binomial name
- Commotria albinervella Hampson, 1918

Species of moth

Commotria albinervella is a species of snout moth in the genus Commotria. It was described by George Hampson in 1918 and is known from Zimbabwe and South Africa.
