= Synoria euglyphella =

Scientific classification
- Domain: Eukaryota
- Kingdom: Animalia
- Phylum: Arthropoda
- Class: Insecta
- Order: Lepidoptera
- Family: Pyralidae
- Genus: Synoria
- Species: S. euglyphella

Binomial name
- Synoria euglyphella Ragonot, 1888

Species of moth

Synoria euglyphella is a species of snout moth. It is found in South Africa.
