= Aglossodes prionophoralis =

Scientific classification
- Kingdom: Animalia
- Phylum: Arthropoda
- Clade: Pancrustacea
- Class: Insecta
- Order: Lepidoptera
- Family: Pyralidae
- Genus: Aglossodes
- Species: A. prionophoralis

Binomial name
- Aglossodes prionophoralis Ragonot, 1891

Synonyms
- Dattinia natalensis Janse, 1922

Species of moth

Aglossodes prionophoralis is a species of snout moth in the genus Aglossodes. It was described by Ragonot, in 1891, and is known from South Africa and Zimbabwe.
