= Epicrocis africanella =

Scientific classification
- Domain: Eukaryota
- Kingdom: Animalia
- Phylum: Arthropoda
- Class: Insecta
- Order: Lepidoptera
- Family: Pyralidae
- Genus: Epicrocis
- Species: E. africanella

Binomial name
- Epicrocis africanella (Ragonot, 1888)

Synonyms
- Salebria africanella Ragonot, 1888

Species of moth

Epicrocis africanella is a species of snout moth in the genus Epicrocis. It was described by Ragonot in 1888. It is found in South Africa.
