= Epicrocis brevipalpata =

Scientific classification
- Domain: Eukaryota
- Kingdom: Animalia
- Phylum: Arthropoda
- Class: Insecta
- Order: Lepidoptera
- Family: Pyralidae
- Genus: Epicrocis
- Species: E. brevipalpata

Binomial name
- Epicrocis brevipalpata Balinsky, 1994

Species of moth

Epicrocis brevipalpata is a species of snout moth in the genus Epicrocis. It was described by Boris Balinsky in 1994. It is found in South Africa.
