= Epicrocis nigrinella =

Scientific classification
- Kingdom: Animalia
- Phylum: Arthropoda
- Class: Insecta
- Order: Lepidoptera
- Family: Pyralidae
- Genus: Epicrocis
- Species: E. nigrinella

Binomial name
- Epicrocis nigrinella Balinsky, 1994

Species of moth

Epicrocis nigrinella is a species of snout moth in the genus Epicrocis. It was described by Boris Balinsky in 1994 and is found in Namibia and South Africa.
