= Mussidia nigrivenella =

Scientific classification
- Domain: Eukaryota
- Kingdom: Animalia
- Phylum: Arthropoda
- Class: Insecta
- Order: Lepidoptera
- Family: Pyralidae
- Genus: Mussidia
- Species: M. nigrivenella

Binomial name
- Mussidia nigrivenella Ragonot, 1888

Species of moth

Mussidia nigrivenella is a species of snout moth in the genus Mussidia. It was described by Ragonot in 1888. It is found in Ivory Coast, Kenya, Niger, South Africa and Mozambique.

The larvae feed on Zea mays, Theobroma cacao and Gossypium species.
