= Mussidia melanoneura =

Scientific classification
- Domain: Eukaryota
- Kingdom: Animalia
- Phylum: Arthropoda
- Class: Insecta
- Order: Lepidoptera
- Family: Pyralidae
- Genus: Mussidia
- Species: M. melanoneura

Binomial name
- Mussidia melanoneura Ragonot, 1893

Species of moth

Mussidia melanoneura is a species of snout moth in the genus Mussidia. It was described by Émile Louis Ragonot in 1893. It is found in South Africa and Madagascar.
