= Lorymodes stenopteralis =

Scientific classification
- Kingdom: Animalia
- Phylum: Arthropoda
- Class: Insecta
- Order: Lepidoptera
- Family: Pyralidae
- Genus: Lorymodes
- Species: L. stenopteralis

Binomial name
- Lorymodes stenopteralis Hampson, 1917

Species of moth

Lorymodes stenopteralis is a species of snout moth in the genus Lorymodes. It was described by George Hampson in 1917. It is found in South Africa.
