= Endolasia transvaalica =

Scientific classification
- Kingdom: Animalia
- Phylum: Arthropoda
- Class: Insecta
- Order: Lepidoptera
- Family: Pyralidae
- Genus: Endolasia
- Species: E. transvaalica

Binomial name
- Endolasia transvaalica Hampson, 1926

Species of moth

Endolasia transvaalica is a species of snout moth in the genus Endolasia. It was described by George Hampson in 1926. It is found in South Africa.
