= Didia subramosella =

Scientific classification
- Kingdom: Animalia
- Phylum: Arthropoda
- Class: Insecta
- Order: Lepidoptera
- Family: Pyralidae
- Genus: Didia
- Species: D. subramosella

Binomial name
- Didia subramosella Ragonot, 1893

Species of moth

Didia subramosella is a species of snout moth in the genus Didia. It was described by Ragonot, in 1893. It is found in South Africa.
