= Myelodes jansei =

Scientific classification
- Kingdom: Animalia
- Phylum: Arthropoda
- Class: Insecta
- Order: Lepidoptera
- Family: Pyralidae
- Genus: Myelodes
- Species: M. jansei

Binomial name
- Myelodes jansei Hampson, 1930

Species of moth

Myelodes jansei is a species of snout moth, and the type species in the genus Myelodes. It was described by George Hampson in 1930. It is found in Zimbabwe.
