= Epicrocis albigeralis =

Scientific classification
- Kingdom: Animalia
- Phylum: Arthropoda
- Class: Insecta
- Order: Lepidoptera
- Family: Pyralidae
- Genus: Epicrocis
- Species: E. albigeralis

Binomial name
- Epicrocis albigeralis (Walker, 1866)

Synonyms
- Scopula albigeralis Walker, 1866

Species of moth

Epicrocis albigeralis is a species of snout moth in the genus Epicrocis. It was described by Francis Walker in 1866, and is known from South Africa.
