= Neopaschia flavociliata =

Scientific classification
- Kingdom: Animalia
- Phylum: Arthropoda
- Class: Insecta
- Order: Lepidoptera
- Family: Pyralidae
- Genus: Neopaschia
- Species: N. flavociliata

Binomial name
- Neopaschia flavociliata Janse, 1922

Species of moth

Neopaschia flavociliata is a species of snout moth in the genus Neopaschia. It was described by Anthonie Johannes Theodorus Janse in 1922. It is found in South Africa.
