= Epicrocis oegnusalis =

Scientific classification
- Kingdom: Animalia
- Phylum: Arthropoda
- Class: Insecta
- Order: Lepidoptera
- Family: Pyralidae
- Genus: Epicrocis
- Species: E. oegnusalis

Binomial name
- Epicrocis oegnusalis (Walker, 1859)

Synonyms
- Pyralis oegnusalis Walker, 1859; Canthelea oegnusalis; Epicrocis anpingialis Strand, 1919; Canthelea anpingialis; Phycis (Myelois) saturatella Mabille, 1880; Canthelea africana Janse, 1942; Eurhodope lateritialis Walker, 1863; Nephopterix lateritialis

Species of moth

Epicrocis oegnusalis is a species of moth of the family Pyralidae. It is found in Sierra Leone, Angola, South Africa, Zanzibar, Madagascar, India (Punjab, Assam), Sri Lanka, Nepal, Bangladesh, the Andaman Islands, Burma, Thailand, Singapore, China, Taiwan, Indonesia (Sumatra, Java, Wallacea), the Philippines (Luzon, Palawan), New Guinea and Australia.
