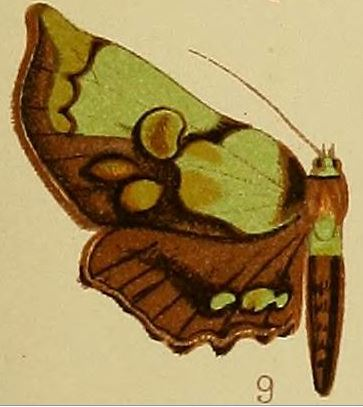

Scientific classification
- Kingdom: Animalia
- Phylum: Arthropoda
- Class: Insecta
- Order: Lepidoptera
- Family: Pyralidae
- Genus: Mittonia
- Species: M. hampsoni

Binomial name
- Mittonia hampsoni (Distant, 1897)

Synonyms
- Macna hampsoni Distant, 1897

= Mittonia hampsoni =

Species of moth

Mittonia hampsoni is a species of snout moth in the genus Mittonia. It was described by William Lucas Distant in 1897 and is known from South Africa (including Transvaal) and Zambia.
