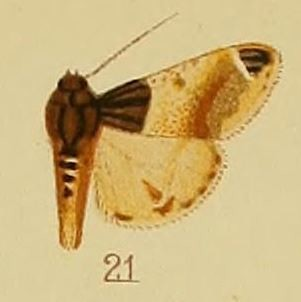

Scientific classification
- Kingdom: Animalia
- Phylum: Arthropoda
- Class: Insecta
- Order: Lepidoptera
- Family: Pyralidae
- Genus: Epilepia
- Species: E. melanobasis

Binomial name
- Epilepia melanobasis (Hampson, 1906)

Synonyms
- Macalla melanobasis Hampson, 1906

= Epilepia melanobasis =

Species of moth

Epilepia melanobasis is a species of snout moth in the genus Epilepia. It was described by George Hampson in 1906, and it is known from South Africa, Namibia and Zimbabwe.
