= Epicrocis picta =

Scientific classification
- Kingdom: Animalia
- Phylum: Arthropoda
- Class: Insecta
- Order: Lepidoptera
- Family: Pyralidae
- Genus: Epicrocis
- Species: E. picta

Binomial name
- Epicrocis picta (Balinsky, 1991)

Synonyms
- Canthelea picta Balinsky, 1991

Species of moth

Epicrocis picta is a species of snout moth in the genus Epicrocis. It was described by Boris Balinsky in 1991 and is known from South Africa and Namibia.
