= Boris Balinsky =

Ukrainian-South African biologist (1905–1997)

Borys Balinsky Борис Балінський
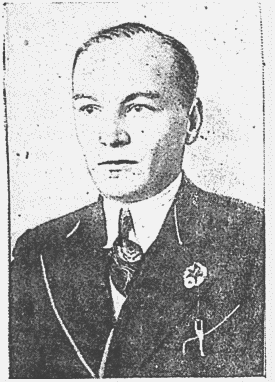
- Born: 23 September 1905; Kiev, Russian Empire
- Died: 1 September 1997 (aged 91); Johannesburg, South Africa
- Citizenship: Russian Empire (1905–1917); Ukrainian People's Republic (1917–1921); Soviet Union (1922–1941); Germany (1941–1949); South Africa (1950–1983)
- Education: Kiev University
- Spouses: Catherine Singaiivska; Elizabeth Stengel
- Children: John Balinsky, Helen David
- Scientific career
- Fields: Embryology, entomology
- Workplaces: Kiev University; I. I. Schmalhausen Institute of Zoology, NAS of Ukraine; University of the Witwatersrand
- Doctoral advisor: Ivan Schmalhausen

Borys Ivanovych Balinsky (23 September 1905 – 1 September 1997) was a Ukrainian-South African biologist, embryologist, entomologist.

A professor at Kyiv University and later the University of the Witwatersrand, Johannesburg, Balinsky was a pioneer researcher in the field of experimental embryology, electron microscopy and developmental biology and the author of a popular textbook in embryology An Introduction to Embryology.

== Early life and education ==
Balinsky was born 23 September 1905, in Kyiv, then part of the Russian Empire (now the capital of present day, Ukraine). His father, Ivan Balinsky, was a historian, lawyer and teacher at Galen College. His mother, Elizaveta Radzymovska was a biology teacher. Her aunt, Valentyna Radzymovska, was a biologist who was involved in Ukrainian independence movements. His parents loved English literature and spoke Ukrainian, Russian and English at home. His love of etymology began with a book he received in 1916 on collecting butterflies, as well as with the summers he spent in the village of Severinovka, where his grandfather kept bees.

He was a student of the Soviet zoologist and evolutionary biologist, Ivan Schmalhausen, and one of the first people to conduct experiments inducing organogenesis in amphibian embryos. His distinguished himself by having his first scientific paper published while he was only 20 and still an undergraduate.

He married his first wife Katya Syngayevskaya in 1928, after meeting her during an embryology seminar. Balinsky's son John Balinsky was born in 1934.

== Career ==
Balinsky became a full university professor at Kyiv University in 1933 at age 28 and the deputy director of the Ukrainian Academy of Sciences two years later in 1935. He became a recognised expert in fish and amphibian development.

His wife was arrested October 7, 1937 for engaging in counter-revolutionary propaganda and was sentenced to ten years in a gulag. Therefore Balinsky lost his post as professor and as deputy director of the Institute. His wife, Syngayevskaya would die of peritonitis in 1943.

A victim of Soviet repressions, Balinsky remained in Kyiv under German occupation during World War II while others evacuated. He and his family fled to Poznań, Poland after the German evacuation and later Munich, Germany. From 1945 to 1947, he worked as a professor of Histology at the temporary UNRRA University in Munich. After the closing of the UNRRA University in 1947, Balinsky also briefly worked in Scotland in Conrad Hal Waddington's laboratory on mice embryology from 1947 to 1949.

Later, in 1949, he migrated to South Africa where he become one of the founders of South African experimental bioscience. In 1949, Balinsky accepted a lecturer position at the University of the Witwatersrand. He was appointed Head of Zoology at the school, serving from 1954 to 1973. In 1960, drawing from the courses he taught at Witwatersrand, Balinsky published the An Introduction to Embryology, which became one of the most widely used Embryology textbook worldwide and served as a foundational textbook in the field for years to come. He also served as Witwatersrand's Dean of the Faculty of Science from 1965 to 1967 He served as the President of the Entomological Society of Southern Africa in 1966.

Balinsky also worked in entomology and described new species of Plecoptera, Odonata and moths from the family Pyralidae, mainly from Caucasus and South Africa.

== Death and legacy ==
He died at home in Johannesburg on 1 September 1997, aged 91. His son John Balinsky also studied and became a scientist. John Balinsky went on to work for the University Witwatersrand and served as the chairman for the Department of Zoology at Iowa State University.

== Insects described ==
=== Plecoptera ===
- Pontoperla teberdinica Balinsky, 1950
- Pontoperla katherinae Balinsky
- Balinskycercella gudu Balinsky, 1956
- Balinskycercella tugelae Balinsky, 1956
- Balinskycercella fontium Balinsky, 1956

=== Dragonflies ===
- Agriocnemis pinheyi Balinsky, 1963
- Agriocnemis ruberrima Balinsky, 1961
- Ceratogomphus triceraticus Balinsky, 1963
- Chlorolestes draconicus Balinsky, 1956
- Orthetrum robustum Balinsky, 1965
- Pseudagrion helenae Balinsky, 1964
- Pseudagrion inopinatum Balinsky, 1971
- Pseudagrion vumbaense Balinsky, 1963
- Urothemis luciana Balinsky, 1961

=== Lepidoptera ===
==== New species ====
- Abachausia grisea Balinsky, 1994
- Acrobasis africanella Balinsky, 1994
- Afromyelois communis Balinsky, 1991
- Afromylea natalica Balinsky, 1994
- Afropsipyla pictella Balinsky, 1994
- Afropsipyla similis Balinsky, 1994
- Ambetilia crucifera Balinsky, 1994
- Ancylosis aeola Balinsky, 1987
- Ancylosis eugraphella Balinsky, 1987
- Ancylosis eurhoda Balinsky, 1989
- Ancylosis glaphyria Balinsky, 1987
- Ancylosis melanophlebia Balinsky, 1989
- Ancylosis mimeugraphella Balinsky, 1989
- Ancylosis montana Balinsky, 1989
- Ancylosis namibiella Balinsky, 1987
- Ancylosis obscurella Balinsky, 1989
- Ancylosis perfervid Balinsky, 1989
- Ancylosis similis Balinsky, 1987
- Apomyelois bicolorata Balinsky, 1991
- Arsissa transvaalica Balinsky, 1991
- Aspithroides minuta Balinsky, 1994
- Azanicola adspersa Balinsky, 1991
- Bahiria defecta Balinsky, 1994
- Bahiria durbanica Balinsky, 1994
- Bahiria flavicosta Balinsky, 1994
- Bahiria latevalvata Balinsky, 1994
- Bahiria macrognatha Balinsky, 1994
- Bahiria magna Balinsky, 1994
- Bahiria similis Balinsky, 1994
- Bahiria ximenianata Balinsky, 1994
- Cabotella inconspicua Balinsky, 1994
- Candiopella dukei Balinsky, 1994
- Cantheleamima excisa Balinsky, 1994
- Ceuthelea umtalensis Balinsky, 1994
- Cunibertoides nigripatagiata Balinsky, 1991
- Emporia melanobasis Balinsky, 1991
- Encryphodes ethiopella Balinsky, 1991
- Epicrocis abbreviata Balinsky, 1994
- Epicrocis ancylosiformis Balinsky, 1994
- Epicrocis arcana Balinsky, 1994
- Epicrocis brevipalpata Balinsky, 1994
- Epicrocis complicata Balinsky, 1994
- Epicrocis coriacelloides Balinsky, 1994
- Epicrocis crassa Balinsky, 1994
- Epicrocis flavicosta Balinsky, 1994
- Epicrocis furcilinea Balinsky, 1994
- Epicrocis gracilis Balinsky, 1994
- Epicrocis imitans Balinsky, 1994
- Epicrocis insolita Balinsky, 1994
- Epicrocis intermedia Balinsky, 1994
- Epicrocis noncapillata Balinsky, 1994
- Epicrocis ornata Balinsky, 1994
- Epicrocis ornatella Balinsky, 1994
- Epicrocis picta Balinsky, 1991
- Epicrocis plumbifasciata Balinsky, 1994
- Epicrocis punctata Balinsky, 1994
- Epicrocis sacculata Balinsky, 1994
- Epicrocis spiculata Balinsky, 1994
- Epicrocis vansoni Balinsky, 1994
- Eucarphia anomala Balinsky, 1994
- Eurhodope nyctosia Balinsky, 1991
- Euzophera crassignatha Balinsky, 1994
- Euzophera crinita Balinsky, 1994
- Euzophera cullinanensis (Balinsky, 1991)
- Euzophera minima Balinsky, 1994
- Euzophera termivelata Balinsky, 1994
- Euzopherodes capicola Balinsky, 1994
- Faveria dubia Balinsky, 1994
- Faveria fusca Balinsky, 1994
- Faveria ignicephalis Balinsky, 1994
- Faveria minima Balinsky, 1994
- Faveria minuscula Balinsky, 1994
- Faveria nonceracanthia Balinsky, 1994
- Faveria onigra Balinsky, 1994
- Faveria poliostrota Balinsky, 1994
- Flabellobasis montana Balinsky, 1991
- Gaana minima Balinsky, 1994
- Gaana quatra Balinsky, 1994
- Getulia maculosa Balinsky, 1994
- Hobohmia paradoxa Balinsky, 1994
- Homoeosoma masaiensis Balinsky, 1991
- Joannisia heterotypa Balinsky, 1994
- Joannisia jansei Balinsky, 1994
- Joannisia poliopasta Balinsky, 1994
- Joannisia semiales Balinsky, 1994
- Kivia longisacculata Balinsky, 1994
- Laodamia affinis Balinsky, 1994
- Laodamia glaucocephalis Balinsky, 1994
- Laodamia grisella Balinsky, 1994
- Laodamia homotypa Balinsky, 1994
- Laodamia hortensis Balinsky, 1994
- Laodamia inermis Balinsky, 1994
- Laodamia injucunda Balinsky, 1994
- Laodamia karkloofensis Balinsky, 1994
- Laodamia lugubris Balinsky, 1994
- Laodamia nigerrima Balinsky, 1994
- Laodamia nonplagella Balinsky, 1994
- Laodamia pulchra Balinsky, 1994
- Laodamia salisburyensis Balinsky, 1994
- Laodamia sarniensis Balinsky, 1994
- Laodamia similis Balinsky, 1994
- Laodamia spissa Balinsky, 1994
- Laodamia squamata Balinsky, 1994
- Laodamia zoetendalensis Balinsky, 1994
- Leviantenna ferox Balinsky, 1994
- Macrovalva quadrielevata Balinsky, 1994
- Magiriamorpha superpalpia Balinsky, 1994
- Miliberta gnathilata Balinsky, 1994
- Nakurubia sacculata Balinsky, 1994
- Namibicola simplex Balinsky, 1994
- Namibicola splendida Balinsky, 1991
- Namibiopsis punctata Balinsky, 1994
- Nonphycita lineata Balinsky, 1994
- Nyctegretis cullinanensis Balinsky, 1991
- Oncocera affinis Balinsky, 1994
- Oncocera cenochreella Ragonot, 1888
- Oncocera dubia Balinsky, 1994
- Oncocera glaucocephalis Balinsky, 1994
- Oncocera grisella Balinsky, 1994
- Oncocera homotypa Balinsky, 1994
- Oncocera horrens Balinsky, 1994
- Oncocera hortensis Balinsky, 1994
- Oncocera ignicephalis Balinsky, 1994
- Oncocera inermis Balinsky, 1994
- Oncocera injucunda Balinsky, 1994
- Oncocera karkloofensis Balinsky, 1994
- Oncocera lugubris Balinsky, 1994
- Oncocera nigerrima Balinsky, 1994
- Oncocera nonplagella Balinsky, 1994
- Oncocera pulchra Balinsky, 1994
- Oncocera salisburyensis Balinsky, 1994
- Oncocera sarniensis Balinsky, 1994
- Oncocera similis Balinsky, 1994
- Oncocera spiculata Balinsky, 1994
- Oncocera spissa Balinsky, 1994
- Oncocera squamata Balinsky, 1994
- Oncocera zoetendalensis Balinsky, 1994
- Ortholepis polyodonta Balinsky, 1991
- Ortholepis pyrobasis Balinsky, 1991
- Ortholepis unguinata Balinsky, 1994
- Paralaodamia haploa Balinsky, 1994
- Paralaodamia angustata Balinsky, 1994
- Paralaodamia fraudulenta Balinsky, 1994
- Paralaodamia modesta Balinsky, 1994
- Paralaodamia pretoriensis Balinsky, 1994
- Paralaodamia serrata Balinsky, 1994
- Paralaodamia subligaculata Balinsky, 1994
- Paralaodamia transvaalica Balinsky, 1994
- Phycita attenuata Balinsky, 1994
- Phycita exaggerata Balinsky, 1994
- Phycita ligubris Balinsky, 1994
- Phycita randensis Balinsky, 1994
- Phycita singularis Balinsky, 1994
- Phycita spiculata Balinsky, 1994
- Phycita spissoterminata Balinsky, 1994
- Phycita suppenditata Balinsky, 1994
- Phycitophila obscurita Balinsky, 1994
- Phycitopsis insulata Balinsky, 1994
- Pretoria nigribasis Balinsky, 1994
- Proancylosis argenticostata Balinsky, 1991
- Pseudogetulia luminosa Balinsky, 1994
- Pseudographis dermatina Balinsky, 1989
- Pseudographis mesosema Balinsky, 1989
- Psorosa africana Balinsky, 1991
- Pylamorpha albida Balinsky, 1994
- Pylamorpha cristata Balinsky, 1994
- Quasiexuperius rhodesianus Balinsky, 1994
- Ramosignathos inconspicuella Balinsky, 1994
- Samaria inconspicuella Balinsky, 1994
- Sematoneura africana Balinsky, 1994
- Shebania grandis Balinsky, 1991
- Shebania maculata Balinsky, 1991
- Spatulipalpia monstrosa Balinsky, 1994
- Staudingeria mimeugraphella Balinsky, 1989
- Trachypteryx victoriola Balinsky, 1991
- Ulophora flavinia Balinsky, 1994

==== New genera ====
- Abachausia Balinsky, 1994
- Afromyelois Balinsky, 1991
- Afromylea Balinsky, 1994
- Afropsipyla Balinsky, 1994
- Ambetilia Balinsky, 1994
- Aspithroides Balinsky, 1994
- Azanicola Balinsky, 1991
- Bahiria Balinsky, 1994
- Cabotella Balinsky, 1994
- Candiopella Balinsky, 1994
- Cantheleamima Balinsky, 1994
- Ceuthelea Balinsky, 1994
- Cunibertoides Balinsky, 1991
- Flabellobasis Balinsky, 1991
- Hobohmia Balinsky, 1994
- Joannisia Balinsky, 1994
- Kivia Balinsky, 1994
- Leviantenna Balinsky, 1994
- Macrovalva Balinsky, 1994
- Magiriamorpha Balinsky, 1994
- Miliberta Balinsky, 1994
- Nakurubia Balinsky, 1994
- Namibicola Balinsky, 1991
- Namibiopsis Balinsky, 1994
- Nonphycita Balinsky, 1994
- Paralaodamia Balinsky, 1994
- Phycitophila Balinsky, 1994
- Proancylosis Balinsky, 1991
- Pseudogetulia Balinsky, 1994
- Pseudographis Balinsky, 1989
- Pylamorpha Balinsky, 1994
- Quasiexuperius Balinsky, 1994
- Ramosignathos Balinsky, 1994
- Shebania Balinsky, 1991

== Sources ==
- Balinsky, Borys (1988). Digital Surrogate of Boris Balinsky Memoir. University of Illinois Archives.
- Korzh, Volodymyr (2005). "Borys Balinsky: transition from embryology to developmental biology" (PDF). BioEssays. 27 (9): 970–977. doi:10.1002/bies.20253. PMID 16108077. Archived from the original (PDF) on 23 September 2015.
- Willis, C.K.; Samways, M.J. (2011). Waterdancers of South Africa's National Botanical Gardens (PDF). SANBI Biodiversity Series. Vol. 21. Pretoria, South Africa: South African National Biodiversity Institute. p. 108. ISBN 978-1-919976-68-6.
- Fabian, B. (December 2009). "Balinsky's Darwinian roots". South African Journal of Science. 105 (11–12): 410–414. doi:10.4102/sajs.v105i11/12.149. Archived from the original on 7 April 2023.
- E.S. Grossman (2005). "Borys Balinsky 10 September 1905 — 1 September 1997". South African Journal of Science. 101 (May/June): 309–312. hdl:10520/EJC96417.
- Desnitskiy, A. G. (2014). "On a contribution of Borys Balinsky to the comparative and ecological embryology of amphibians". Russian Journal of Developmental Biology. 45 (2): 101–104. doi:10.1134/S1062360414010032. ISSN 1062-3604. S2CID 5635200.
