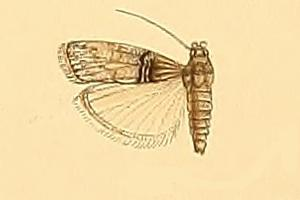
- Trachonitis capensis

Scientific classification
- Kingdom: Animalia
- Phylum: Arthropoda
- Clade: Pancrustacea
- Class: Insecta
- Order: Lepidoptera
- Family: Pyralidae
- Tribe: Phycitini
- Genus: Trachonitis; Zeller, 1848

Type species
- Tinea christella (Hübner, 1776)

= Trachonitis (moth) =

Genus of moths

Trachonitis is a genus of snout moths. It was described by Philipp Christoph Zeller in 1848.

== Species ==
- Trachonitis capensis Hampson, 1901 (often placed in Flabellobasis)
- Trachonitis cristella (Hübner, 1776) (Europe)
- Trachonitis odilella Legrand, 1966 (from the Seychelles)
- Trachonitis renatella Legrand, 1966 (from the Seychelles)
