= Namibicola splendida =

Scientific classification
- Domain: Eukaryota
- Kingdom: Animalia
- Phylum: Arthropoda
- Class: Insecta
- Order: Lepidoptera
- Family: Pyralidae
- Genus: Namibicola
- Species: N. splendida

Binomial name
- Namibicola splendida Balinsky, 1991

Species of moth

Namibicola splendida is a species of snout moth in the genus Namibicola. It was described by Boris Balinsky in 1991 and is known from Namibia (including Luederitz, the type location) and South Africa.
