= Namibicola simplex =

Scientific classification
- Domain: Eukaryota
- Kingdom: Animalia
- Phylum: Arthropoda
- Class: Insecta
- Order: Lepidoptera
- Family: Pyralidae
- Genus: Namibicola
- Species: N. simplex

Binomial name
- Namibicola simplex Balinsky, 1994

Species of moth

Namibicola simplex is a species of snout moth in the genus Namibicola. It was described by Boris Balinsky in 1994 and is known from South Africa (including Eastern Cape, the type localation).
