= Euzopherodes taprobalis =

Scientific classification
- Kingdom: Animalia
- Phylum: Arthropoda
- Class: Insecta
- Order: Lepidoptera
- Family: Pyralidae
- Genus: Euzopherodes
- Species: E. taprobalis

Binomial name
- Euzopherodes taprobalis (Hampson, 1908)

Synonyms
- Nonia taprobalis Hampson, 1908; Neononia taprobalis

Species of moth

Euzopherodes taprobalis is a species of snout moth in the genus Euzopherodes. It was described by George Hampson in 1908. It is found in Sri Lanka.
