= Flabellobasis montana =

Scientific classification
- Domain: Eukaryota
- Kingdom: Animalia
- Phylum: Arthropoda
- Class: Insecta
- Order: Lepidoptera
- Family: Pyralidae
- Genus: Flabellobasis
- Species: F. montana

Binomial name
- Flabellobasis montana Balinsky, 1991

Species of moth

Flabellobasis montana is a species of snout moth. It was described by Boris Balinsky in 1991 and is known from South Africa.
