= Ortholepis baloghi =

Scientific classification
- Kingdom: Animalia
- Phylum: Arthropoda
- Clade: Pancrustacea
- Class: Insecta
- Order: Lepidoptera
- Family: Pyralidae
- Genus: Ortholepis
- Species: O. baloghi

Binomial name
- Ortholepis baloghi Neunzig, 2003

Species of moth

Ortholepis baloghi is a moth of the family Pyralidae. Herbert H. Neunzig described it in 2003. It is found in North America, including Michigan. It is found in the prairie fen habitat.

The wingspan is about 13 mm.
