= Euzopherodes vapidella =

Scientific classification
- Kingdom: Animalia
- Phylum: Arthropoda
- Clade: Pancrustacea
- Class: Insecta
- Order: Lepidoptera
- Family: Pyralidae
- Genus: Euzopherodes
- Species: E. vapidella

Binomial name
- Euzopherodes vapidella (J. J. Mann, 1857)

Synonyms
- Ephestia vapidella J. J. Mann, 1857; Delattinia vapidella maroccella Roesler, 1965

Species of moth

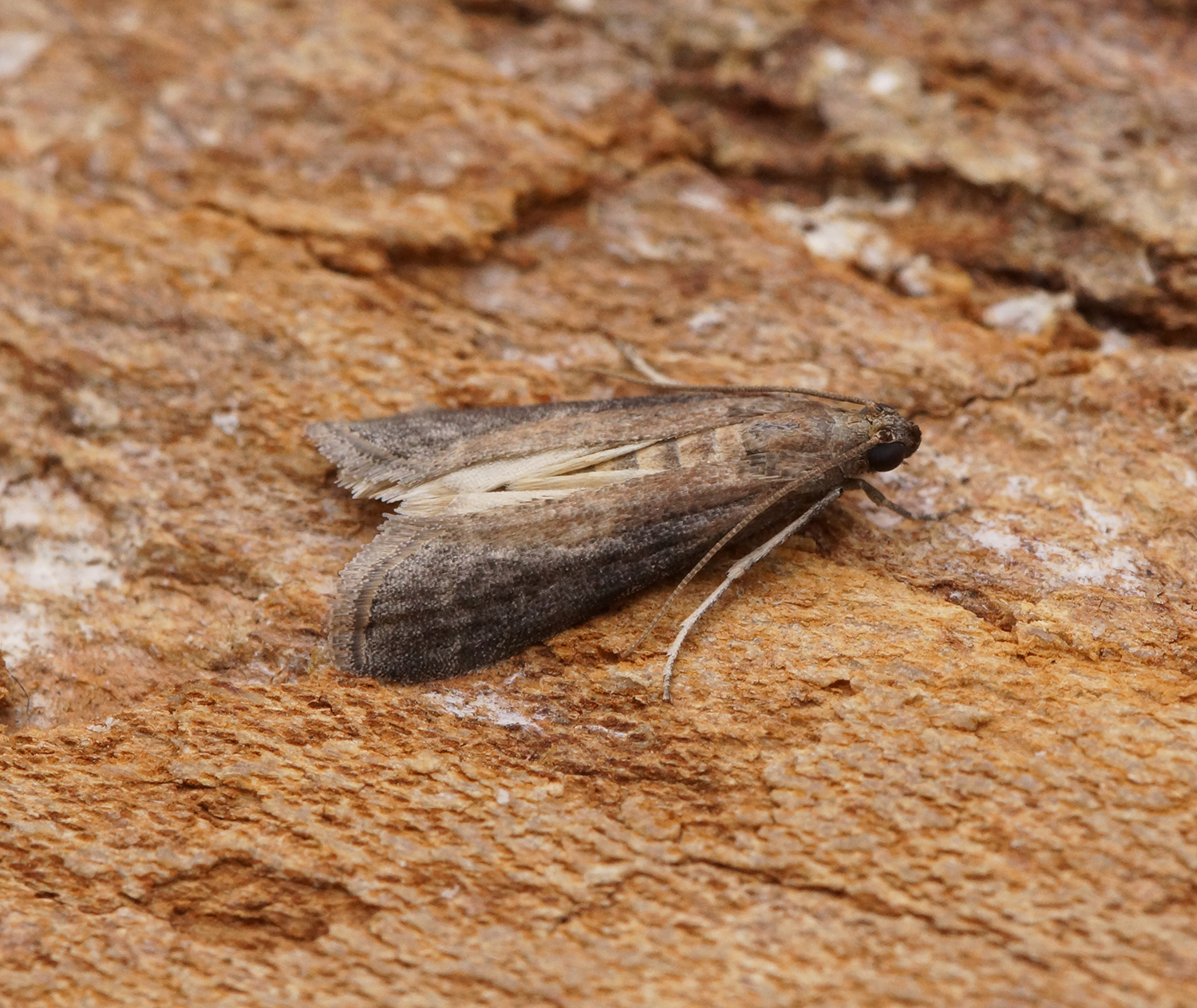
A yam moth

Euzopherodes vapidella, the yam moth or citrus stub moth, is a species of snout moth in the genus Euzopherodes. It was described by Josef Johann Mann in 1857. It is found in Spain, Portugal, France, Switzerland, Austria, the Balkan Peninsula, Sardinia, Sicily, Israel, Egypt, Morocco, Ivory Coast, Nigeria and western Africa.

Adults are fruit piercers and are considered a pest on Citrus species.

The larvae feed on Dioscorea alata and Dioscorea cayenensis.
