= Pseudagrion vumbaense =

Conservation status
- Endangered (IUCN 3.1)

Scientific classification
- Kingdom: Animalia
- Phylum: Arthropoda
- Clade: Pancrustacea
- Class: Insecta
- Order: Odonata
- Suborder: Zygoptera
- Family: Coenagrionidae
- Genus: Pseudagrion
- Species: P. vumbaense

Binomial name
- Pseudagrion vumbaense Balinsky, 1963

Species of damselfly

Pseudagrion vumbaense is a species of damselfly in the family Coenagrionidae. It is endemic to Zimbabwe. Its natural habitats are subtropical or tropical moist montane forests and rivers. It is threatened by habitat loss.
