= Azanicola =

Scientific classification
- Domain: Eukaryota
- Kingdom: Animalia
- Phylum: Arthropoda
- Class: Insecta
- Order: Lepidoptera
- Family: Pyralidae
- Subfamily: Phycitinae
- Genus: Azanicola; Balinsky, 1991
- Species: A. adspersa

Binomial name
- Azanicola adspersa Balinsky, 1991

Genus of moths

Azanicola is a monotypic snout moth genus described by Boris Balinsky in 1991. Its single species, Azanicola adspersa, described by the same author, is found in South Africa.
