= Cabotella =

Scientific classification
- Domain: Eukaryota
- Kingdom: Animalia
- Phylum: Arthropoda
- Class: Insecta
- Order: Lepidoptera
- Family: Pyralidae
- Subfamily: Phycitinae
- Genus: Cabotella; Balinsky, 1994
- Species: C. inconspicua

Binomial name
- Cabotella inconspicua Balinsky, 1994

Genus of moths

Cabotella is a monotypic snout moth genus described by Boris Balinsky in 1994. Its only species, Cabotella inconspicua, described in the same publication, is found in South Africa.
