= Euzopherodes albicans =

Scientific classification
- Kingdom: Animalia
- Phylum: Arthropoda
- Clade: Pancrustacea
- Class: Insecta
- Order: Lepidoptera
- Family: Pyralidae
- Genus: Euzopherodes
- Species: E. albicans

Binomial name
- Euzopherodes albicans Hampson, 1899

Species of moth

Euzopherodes albicans is a species of snout moth in the genus Euzopherodes. It was described by George Hampson in 1899. It is found in Australia.
