= Bahiria latevalvata =

Scientific classification
- Domain: Eukaryota
- Kingdom: Animalia
- Phylum: Arthropoda
- Class: Insecta
- Order: Lepidoptera
- Family: Pyralidae
- Genus: Bahiria
- Species: B. latevalvata

Binomial name
- Bahiria latevalvata Balinsky, 1994

Species of moth

Bahiria latevalvata is a species of snout moth in the genus Bahiria. It was described by Boris Balinsky in 1994 and is found in South Africa.
