= Encryphodes aenictopa =

Scientific classification
- Domain: Eukaryota
- Kingdom: Animalia
- Phylum: Arthropoda
- Class: Insecta
- Order: Lepidoptera
- Family: Pyralidae
- Genus: Encryphodes
- Species: E. aenictopa

Binomial name
- Encryphodes aenictopa Turner, 1913

Species of moth

Encryphodes aenictopa is a species of snout moth. It was described by Alfred Jefferis Turner in 1913 and is found in Australia.
