= Euzopherodes ephestialis =

Scientific classification
- Kingdom: Animalia
- Phylum: Arthropoda
- Class: Insecta
- Order: Lepidoptera
- Family: Pyralidae
- Genus: Euzopherodes
- Species: E. ephestialis

Binomial name
- Euzopherodes ephestialis Hampson, 1903

Synonyms
- Symphestia ephestialis

Species of moth

Euzopherodes ephestialis is a species of snout moth in the genus Euzopherodes. It was described by George Hampson in 1903. It is found in India and Pakistan.

The larvae feed on Loranthus species.
