= Ortholepis subgenistella =

Scientific classification
- Kingdom: Animalia
- Phylum: Arthropoda
- Class: Insecta
- Order: Lepidoptera
- Family: Pyralidae
- Genus: Ortholepis
- Species: O. subgenistella

Binomial name
- Ortholepis subgenistella (Hampson, 1901)

Synonyms
- Nephopteryx subgenistella Hampson, 1901

Species of moth

Ortholepis subgenistella is a moth of the family Pyralidae. It was described by George Hampson in 1901. It is found in South Africa.
