= Nyctegretis cullinanensis =

Scientific classification
- Domain: Eukaryota
- Kingdom: Animalia
- Phylum: Arthropoda
- Class: Insecta
- Order: Lepidoptera
- Family: Pyralidae
- Genus: Nyctegretis
- Species: N. cullinanensis

Binomial name
- Nyctegretis cullinanensis Balinsky, 1991

Species of moth

Nyctegretis cullinanensis is a species of snout moth in the genus Nyctegretis. It was described by Boris Balinsky in 1991 and is known from Transvaal, South Africa.
