= Euzopherodes euphrontis =

Scientific classification
- Kingdom: Animalia
- Phylum: Arthropoda
- Class: Insecta
- Order: Lepidoptera
- Family: Pyralidae
- Genus: Euzopherodes
- Species: E. euphrontis

Binomial name
- Euzopherodes euphrontis (Meyrick, 1937)

Synonyms
- Nyctigenes euphrontis Meyrick, 1937

Species of moth

Euzopherodes euphrontis is a species of snout moth in the genus Euzopherodes. It was described by Edward Meyrick in 1937, and is known from the Democratic Republic of the Congo.
