= Abachausia =

Scientific classification
- Kingdom: Animalia
- Phylum: Arthropoda
- Clade: Pancrustacea
- Class: Insecta
- Order: Lepidoptera
- Family: Pyralidae
- Subfamily: Phycitinae
- Genus: Abachausia; Balinsky, 1994
- Species: A. grisea

Binomial name
- Abachausia grisea Balinsky, 1994

Genus of moths

Abachausia is a monotypic genus of moths belonging to the family Pyralidae. It contains only one species, Abachausia grisea, which is found in Namibia and South Africa.
