= Ceuthelea =

Scientific classification
- Kingdom: Animalia
- Phylum: Arthropoda
- Class: Insecta
- Order: Lepidoptera
- Family: Pyralidae
- Subfamily: Phycitinae
- Genus: Ceuthelea; Balinsky, 1994
- Species: C. umtalensis

Binomial name
- Ceuthelea umtalensis Balinsky, 1994

Genus of moths

Ceuthelea is a monotypic snout moth genus described by Boris Balinsky in 1994. Its single species, Ceuthelea untalensis, described in the same publication, is found in South Africa.
