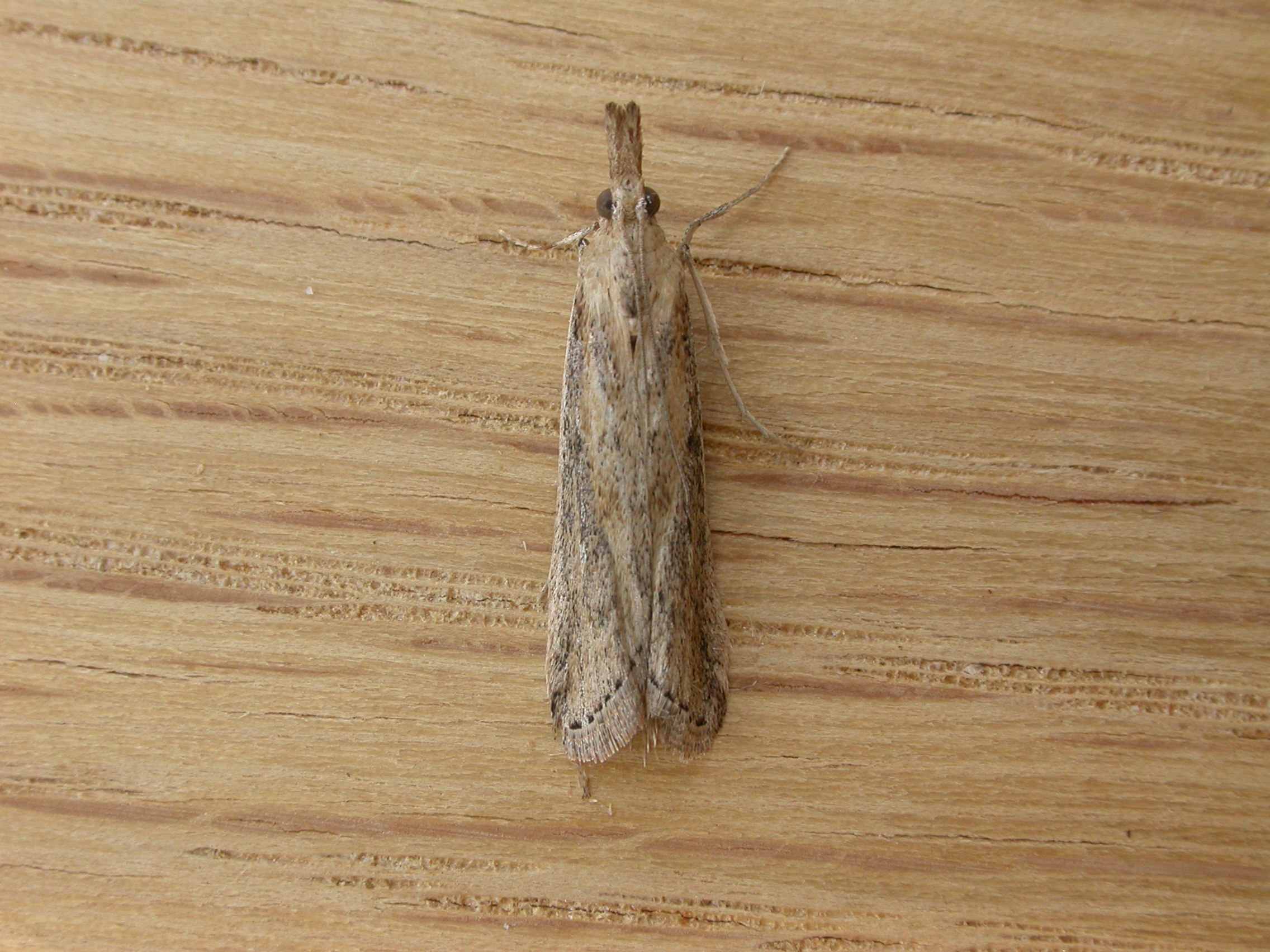
- Faveria

Scientific classification
- Kingdom: Animalia
- Phylum: Arthropoda
- Class: Insecta
- Order: Lepidoptera
- Family: Pyralidae
- Tribe: Phycitini
- Genus: Faveria; Walker, 1859

Synonyms
- Oligochroa Ragonot, 1888; Pristarthria Ragonot, 1893; Sclerobia Ragonot, 1893

= Faveria =

Genus of moths

Faveria is a genus of snout moths. It was described by Francis Walker in 1859.

== Species ==
- Faveria albilinea (de Joannis, 1927)
- Faveria coriacella (Ragonot, 1888)
- Faveria dasyptera (Lower, 1903)
- Faveria dionysia (Zeller, 1846)
- Faveria griseopuncta Horak, 1997
- Faveria laiasalis Walker, 1859
- Faveria leucophaeella (Zeller, 1867)
- Faveria minutella (Ragonot, 1885)
- Faveria mundalis (Walker, 1863)
- Faveria nigrilinea (de Joannis, 1927)
- Faveria poliostrota (Balinsky, 1994)
- Faveria sordida (Staudinger, 1879)
- Faveria subdasyptera Yamanaka, 2002
- Faveria tritalis (Walker, 1863)
