= Euzopherodes homocapna =

Scientific classification
- Domain: Eukaryota
- Kingdom: Animalia
- Phylum: Arthropoda
- Class: Insecta
- Order: Lepidoptera
- Family: Pyralidae
- Genus: Euzopherodes
- Species: E. homocapna

Binomial name
- Euzopherodes homocapna Turner, 1947

Species of moth

Euzopherodes homocapna is a species of snout moth in the genus Euzopherodes. It was described by Alfred Jefferis Turner in 1947 and is found in Australia.
