= Nyctegretis aenigmella =

Scientific classification
- Domain: Eukaryota
- Kingdom: Animalia
- Phylum: Arthropoda
- Class: Insecta
- Order: Lepidoptera
- Family: Pyralidae
- Genus: Nyctegretis
- Species: N. aenigmella

Binomial name
- Nyctegretis aenigmella Leraut, 2002

Species of moth

Nyctegretis aenigmella is a species of snout moth. It is found in France and on Corsica.
