= Faveria coriacella =

Scientific classification
- Domain: Eukaryota
- Kingdom: Animalia
- Phylum: Arthropoda
- Class: Insecta
- Order: Lepidoptera
- Family: Pyralidae
- Genus: Faveria
- Species: F. coriacella

Binomial name
- Faveria coriacella (Ragonot, 1888)

Synonyms
- Oligochroa coriacella Ragonot, 1888; Salebria coriacella; Pempelia coriacella

Species of moth

Faveria coriacella is a species of moth in the family Pyralidae. It was described by Ragonot in 1888. It is found in South Africa.
