= Euzopherodes charlottae =

Scientific classification
- Domain: Eukaryota
- Kingdom: Animalia
- Phylum: Arthropoda
- Class: Insecta
- Order: Lepidoptera
- Family: Pyralidae
- Genus: Euzopherodes
- Species: E. charlottae

Binomial name
- Euzopherodes charlottae (Rebel, 1914)

Synonyms
- Euzophera charlottae Rebel, 1914

Species of moth

Euzopherodes charlottae is a species of snout moth in the genus Euzopherodes. It was described by Rebel in 1914. It is found in France, the Czech Republic, Austria, Slovakia, Hungary, Romania, Bulgaria, North Macedonia, Albania and Turkey.
