= Ortholepis cretaciella =

Scientific classification
- Domain: Eukaryota
- Kingdom: Animalia
- Phylum: Arthropoda
- Class: Insecta
- Order: Lepidoptera
- Family: Pyralidae
- Genus: Ortholepis
- Species: O. cretaciella

Binomial name
- Ortholepis cretaciella de Joannis, 1927

Species of moth

Ortholepis cretaciella is a moth of the family Pyralidae. It was described by Joseph de Joannis in 1927. It is found in Mozambique.
