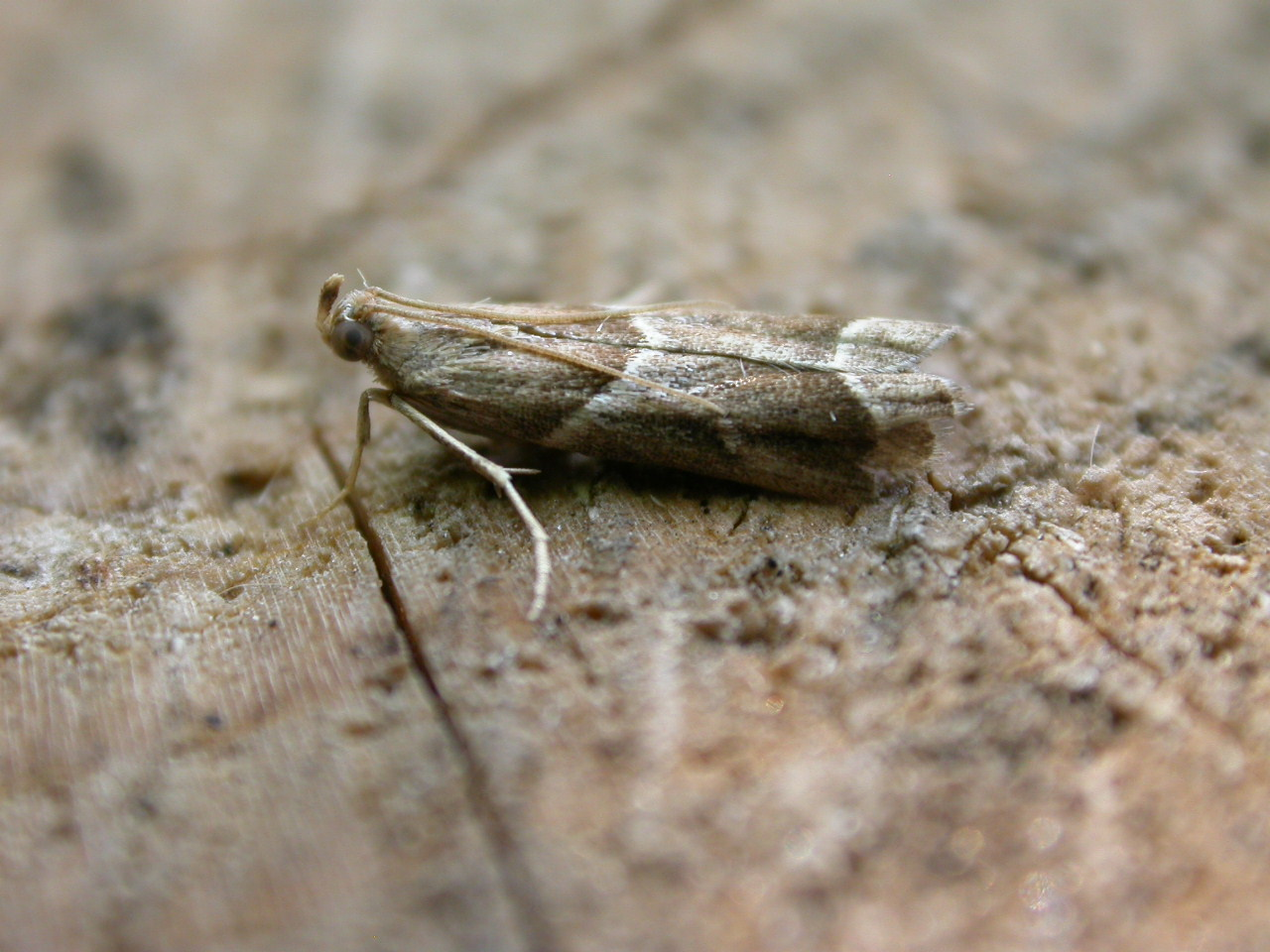

Scientific classification
- Kingdom: Animalia
- Phylum: Arthropoda
- Class: Insecta
- Order: Lepidoptera
- Family: Pyralidae
- Genus: Nyctegretis
- Species: N. lineana

Binomial name
- Nyctegretis lineana (Scopoli, 1786)

Synonyms
- Tinea lineana Scopoli, 1786; Tinea achatinella Hübner, 1824; Nyctegretis calamitatella Roesler, 1973; Nyctegretis katastrophella Roesler, 1970

= Nyctegretis lineana =

Species of moth

Nyctegretis lineana is a moth of the family Pyralidae. It is found from Europe to China and Mongolia.

The wingspan is 17–19 mm (0.67–0.75 in). The butterflies are on wing from July to August depending on the location.

The larvae feed on Ononis repens repens, Ononis repens spinosa and sometimes Trifolium.
