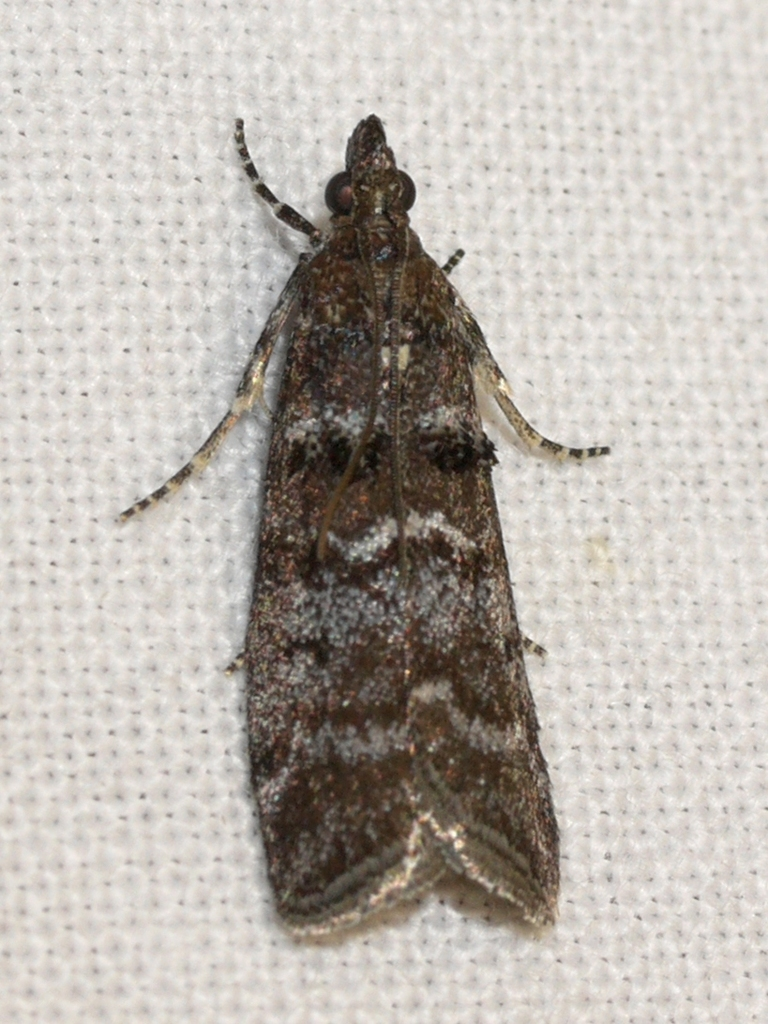

Scientific classification
- Kingdom: Animalia
- Phylum: Arthropoda
- Class: Insecta
- Order: Lepidoptera
- Family: Pyralidae
- Genus: Ortholepis
- Species: O. pasadamia

Binomial name
- Ortholepis pasadamia (Dyar, 1917)

Synonyms
- Immyrla pasadamia Dyar, 1917

= Ortholepis pasadamia =

Species of moth

Ortholepis pasadamia, the striped birch pyralid moth or paper birch leaftier, is a moth of the family Pyralidae. It was described by Harrison Gray Dyar Jr. in 1917. It is found in North America, including Alberta, British Columbia, Illinois, Maine, Manitoba, Massachusetts, Minnesota, New Hampshire, Nova Scotia, Ontario, Quebec and Wisconsin.

The larvae feed on birch.
