= Candiopella =

Scientific classification
- Domain: Eukaryota
- Kingdom: Animalia
- Phylum: Arthropoda
- Class: Insecta
- Order: Lepidoptera
- Family: Pyralidae
- Subfamily: Phycitinae
- Genus: Candiopella; Balinsky, 1994

Genus of moths

Candiopella is a genus of snout moths. It was described by Boris Balinsky in 1994 and is known from South Africa and Réunion.

== Species ==
- Candiopella dukei Balinsky, 1994
- Candiopella reunionalis Guillermet, 2007
