= Faveria sordida =

Scientific classification
- Domain: Eukaryota
- Kingdom: Animalia
- Phylum: Arthropoda
- Class: Insecta
- Order: Lepidoptera
- Family: Pyralidae
- Genus: Faveria
- Species: F. sordida

Binomial name
- Faveria sordida (Staudinger, 1879)

Synonyms
- Pempelia sordida Staudinger, 1879; Pristophora atmologa Meyrick, 1937

Species of moth

Faveria sordida is a species of moth in the family Pyralidae. It was described by Staudinger in 1879. It is found on Cyprus, and in Israel, Asia Minor and Iraq.
