= Faveria griseopuncta =

Scientific classification
- Domain: Eukaryota
- Kingdom: Animalia
- Phylum: Arthropoda
- Class: Insecta
- Order: Lepidoptera
- Family: Pyralidae
- Genus: Faveria
- Species: F. griseopuncta

Binomial name
- Faveria griseopuncta Horak, 1997

Species of moth

Faveria griseopuncta is a species of moth in the family Pyralidae. It was described by Marianne Horak in 1997. It is found in the Australian state of Queensland.
