= Nyctegretis leonina =

Scientific classification
- Kingdom: Animalia
- Phylum: Arthropoda
- Class: Insecta
- Order: Lepidoptera
- Family: Pyralidae
- Genus: Nyctegretis
- Species: N. leonina

Binomial name
- Nyctegretis leonina (Hampson, 1930)

Synonyms
- Trichorachia leonina Hampson, 1930

Species of moth

Nyctegretis leonina is a species of snout moth in the genus Nyctegretis. It was described by George Hampson in 1930, and it is known from South Africa, Sierra Leone and Zimbabwe.
