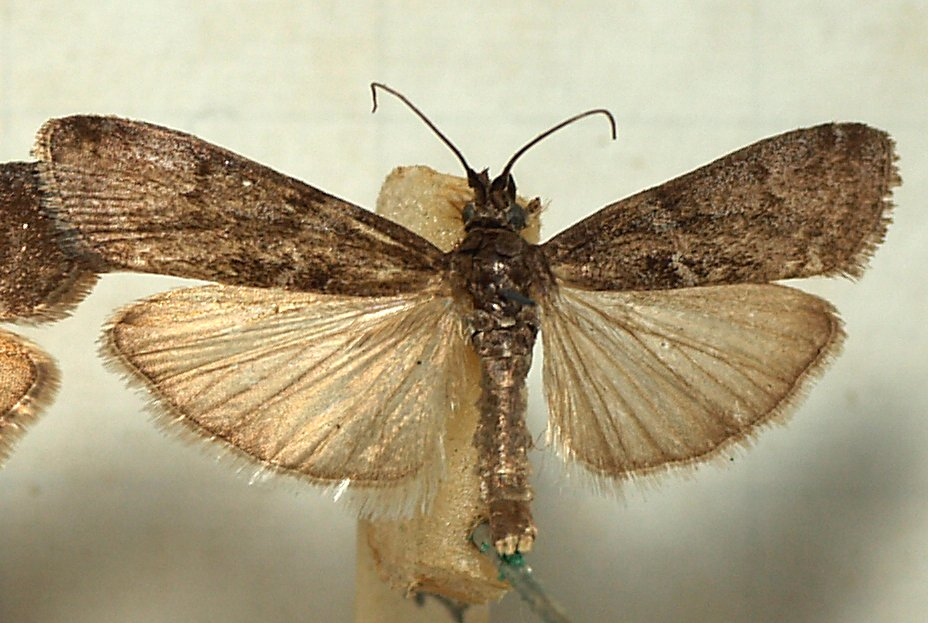

Scientific classification
- Kingdom: Animalia
- Phylum: Arthropoda
- Clade: Pancrustacea
- Class: Insecta
- Order: Lepidoptera
- Family: Pyralidae
- Genus: Ortholepis
- Species: O. betulae

Binomial name
- Ortholepis betulae (Goeze, 1778)

Synonyms
- Metriostola betulae Goeze, 1778

= Ortholepis betulae =

Species of moth

Ortholepis betulae is a moth of the family Pyralidae described by Johann August Ephraim Goeze in 1778. It is found in Europe.

The wingspan is 24–27 mm. The moth flies in one generation from May to August.

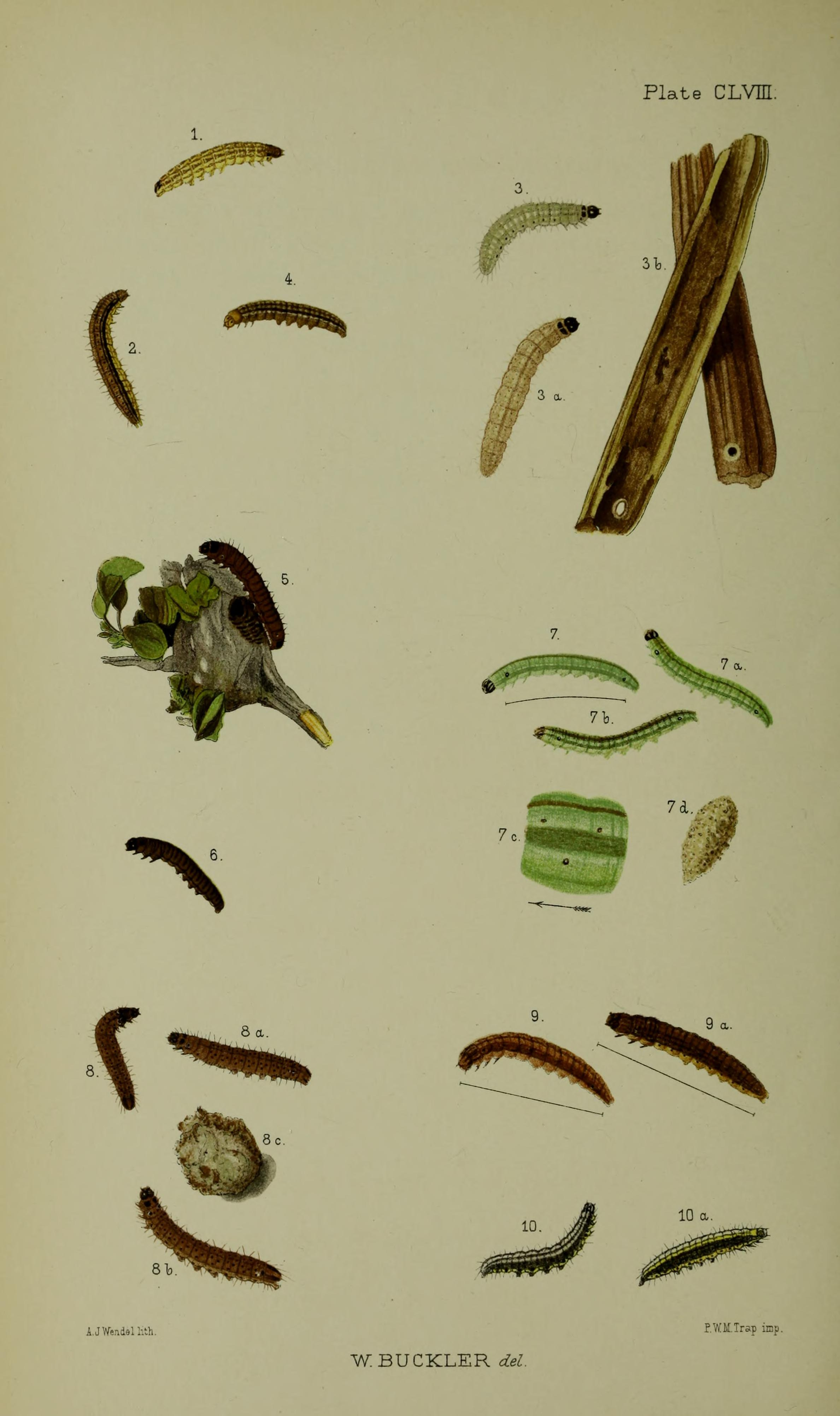
Figs. 10, 10a larva after final moult

The caterpillars feed on birch.

== Notes ==
1. The flight season refers to Belgium and the Netherlands. This may vary in other parts of the range.
