= Cantheleamima =

Scientific classification
- Domain: Eukaryota
- Kingdom: Animalia
- Phylum: Arthropoda
- Class: Insecta
- Order: Lepidoptera
- Family: Pyralidae
- Subfamily: Phycitinae
- Genus: Cantheleamima; Balinsky, 1994
- Species: C. excisa

Binomial name
- Cantheleamima excisa Balinsky, 1994

Genus of moths

Cantheleamima is a monotypic snout moth genus described by Boris Balinsky in 1994. Its only species, Cantheleamima excisa, described in the same publication, is found in South Africa and Zimbabwe.
