= Aspithroides =

Scientific classification
- Domain: Eukaryota
- Kingdom: Animalia
- Phylum: Arthropoda
- Class: Insecta
- Order: Lepidoptera
- Family: Pyralidae
- Subfamily: Phycitinae
- Genus: Aspithroides; Balinsky, 1994
- Species: A. minuta

Binomial name
- Aspithroides minuta Balinsky, 1994

Genus of moths

Aspithroides is a monotypic snout moth genus described by Boris Balinsky in 1994. Its single species, Aspithroides minuta, described by the same author, is found in South Africa.
