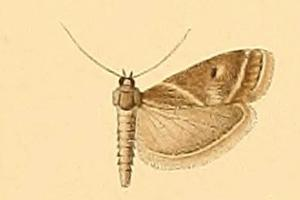
- Nyctegretis triangulella

Scientific classification
- Kingdom: Animalia
- Phylum: Arthropoda
- Clade: Pancrustacea
- Class: Insecta
- Order: Lepidoptera
- Family: Pyralidae
- Tribe: Phycitini
- Genus: Nyctegretis; Zeller, 1848

Synonyms
- Trichorachia Hampson, 1930

= Nyctegretis =

Genus of moths

Nyctegretis is a genus of moths in the family of Pyralidae. It was first described by Philipp Christoph Zeller in 1848.

== Species ==
- Nyctegretis aenigmella P. Leraut, 2002
- Nyctegretis cullinanensis Balinsky, 1991
- Nyctegretis inclinella Ragonot, 1888
- Nyctegretis leonina (Hampson, 1930)
- Nyctegretis lineana (Scopoli, 1786)
- Nyctegretis ruminella La Harpe, 1860
- Nyctegretis triangulella Ragonot, 1901
