= Bahiria maytenella =

Scientific classification
- Domain: Eukaryota
- Kingdom: Animalia
- Phylum: Arthropoda
- Class: Insecta
- Order: Lepidoptera
- Family: Pyralidae
- Genus: Bahiria
- Species: B. maytenella

Binomial name
- Bahiria maytenella Yamanaka, 2004

Species of moth

Bahiria maytenella is a species of snout moth. It was described by Hiroshi Yamanaka in 2004. It is found in Japan (it was described from Okinawa).

The wingspan is 9–11 millimetres (0.35–0.43 in).
