= Afropsipyla =

Scientific classification
- Kingdom: Animalia
- Phylum: Arthropoda
- Clade: Pancrustacea
- Class: Insecta
- Order: Lepidoptera
- Family: Pyralidae
- Subfamily: Phycitinae
- Genus: Afropsipyla; Balinsky, 1994

Genus of moths

Afropsipyla is a genus of snout moths. It was described by Boris Balinsky in 1994. It contains the species A. pictella from Namibia and A. similis from South Africa.

== Species ==
- Afropsipyla pictella Balinsky, 1994
- Afropsipyla similis Balinsky, 1994
