= Lyubov Yanovska =

Ukrainian writer and feminist

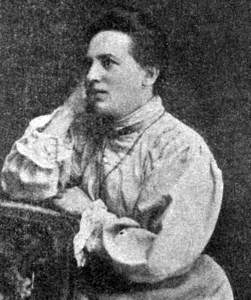
- Born: 1861; Eastern Ukraine
- Died: 1933 (aged 71–72)
- Occupations: Writer, feminist
- Notable work: Novels, plays
- Spouse: Vasyl Yanovskyi
- Children: Valentyna Radzymovska

Lyubov Yanovska (Ukrainian: Любов Олександрівна Яновська; 1861–1933) was a Ukrainian writer and feminist.

== Biography ==
The daughter of Oleksandr Shcherbachov, a published author of Russian descent, and a Ukrainian mother, she was born Lyubov Shcherbachova in eastern Ukraine. Her mother's aunt was married to Panteleimon Kulish. Her parents separated due to tensions caused by their different ethnic backgrounds. In 1881, she married Vasyl Yanovskyi, a Ukrainian intellectual, and educated herself on Ukrainian culture, literature and history. Her first short story was published in 1897. She also wrote novels and plays.

In 1905, Yanovska moved to Kyiv, where she became involved in literary circles and the women's movement. After 1916, she was no longer able to write because of health problems aggravated by her work helping women and children left in poverty by World War I. She suffered a paralytic stroke in 1923 and died ten years later.

Her work was translated to English for the collections In the Dark of the Night (1998) and Warm the Children, O Sun (1998).

Her daughter was Valentyna Radzymovska, Ukrainian physiologist and biochemist.
