= Nyctegretis inclinella =

Scientific classification
- Domain: Eukaryota
- Kingdom: Animalia
- Phylum: Arthropoda
- Class: Insecta
- Order: Lepidoptera
- Family: Pyralidae
- Genus: Nyctegretis
- Species: N. inclinella

Binomial name
- Nyctegretis inclinella Ragonot, 1888

Species of moth

Nyctegretis inclinella is a species of snout moth in the genus Nyctegretis. It was described by Ragonot in 1888. It is found in South Africa.
