= Faveria subdasyptera =

Scientific classification
- Domain: Eukaryota
- Kingdom: Animalia
- Phylum: Arthropoda
- Class: Insecta
- Order: Lepidoptera
- Family: Pyralidae
- Genus: Faveria
- Species: F. subdasyptera

Binomial name
- Faveria subdasyptera Yamanaka, 2002

Species of moth

Faveria subdasyptera is a species of moth in the snout moth family (Pyralidae). It was described by Hiroshi Yamanaka in 2002 and is endemic to Okinawa, Japan.
