= Candiopella dukei =

Scientific classification
- Domain: Eukaryota
- Kingdom: Animalia
- Phylum: Arthropoda
- Class: Insecta
- Order: Lepidoptera
- Family: Pyralidae
- Genus: Candiopella
- Species: C. dukei

Binomial name
- Candiopella dukei Balinsky, 1994

Species of moth

Candiopella dukei is a species of snout moth in the genus Candiopella. It was described by Boris Balinsky in 1994 and is known from South Africa.
