= Faveria dasyptera =

Scientific classification
- Kingdom: Animalia
- Phylum: Arthropoda
- Class: Insecta
- Order: Lepidoptera
- Family: Pyralidae
- Genus: Faveria
- Species: F. dasyptera

Binomial name
- Faveria dasyptera (Lower, 1903)

Synonyms
- Nephopteryx dasyptera Lower, 1903

Species of moth

Faveria dasyptera is a species of moth in the family Pyralidae. It was described by Oswald Bertram Lower in 1903. It is found on the east coasts of the Australian states of Queensland and New South Wales.
