= Cunibertoides =

Scientific classification
- Domain: Eukaryota
- Kingdom: Animalia
- Phylum: Arthropoda
- Class: Insecta
- Order: Lepidoptera
- Family: Pyralidae
- Subfamily: Phycitinae
- Genus: Cunibertoides; Balinsky, 1991
- Species: C. nigripatagiata

Binomial name
- Cunibertoides nigripatagiata Balinsky, 1991

Genus of moths

Cunibertoides is a monotypic snout moth genus described by Boris Balinsky in 1991. Its only species, Cunibertoides nigripatagiata, described by the same author, is known from South Africa.
