= Acrobasis africanella =

Scientific classification
- Kingdom: Animalia
- Phylum: Arthropoda
- Clade: Pancrustacea
- Class: Insecta
- Order: Lepidoptera
- Family: Pyralidae
- Genus: Acrobasis
- Species: A. africanella

Binomial name
- Acrobasis africanella Balinsky, 1994

Species of moth

Acrobasis africanella is a species of snout moth in the genus Acrobasis. It was described by Boris Balinsky in 1994 and is found in South Africa.
