= Euzopherodes nipponensis =

Scientific classification
- Domain: Eukaryota
- Kingdom: Animalia
- Phylum: Arthropoda
- Class: Insecta
- Order: Lepidoptera
- Family: Pyralidae
- Genus: Euzopherodes
- Species: E. nipponensis

Binomial name
- Euzopherodes nipponensis Yamanaka, 2006

Species of moth

Euzopherodes nipponensis is a species of snout moth in the genus Euzopherodes. It was described by Hiroshi Yamanaka in 2006 and is known from Japan.
