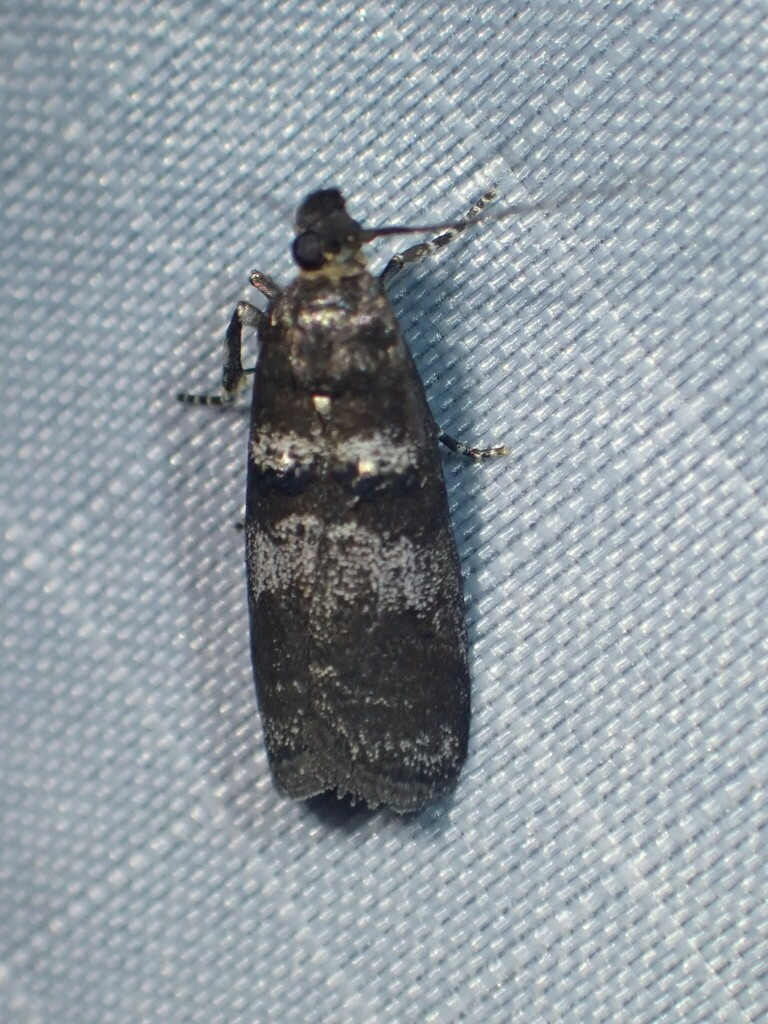

Scientific classification
- Domain: Eukaryota
- Kingdom: Animalia
- Phylum: Arthropoda
- Class: Insecta
- Order: Lepidoptera
- Family: Pyralidae
- Genus: Ortholepis
- Species: O. myricella

Binomial name
- Ortholepis myricella McDunnough, 1958

= Ortholepis myricella =

Species of moth

Ortholepis myricella is a moth of the family Pyralidae. It was described by James Halliday McDunnough in 1958. It is found in North America, including British Columbia, Maine, Manitoba, Michigan, Nova Scotia and Quebec.

The wingspan is about 15 mm.
