= Faveria poliostrota =

Scientific classification
- Domain: Eukaryota
- Kingdom: Animalia
- Phylum: Arthropoda
- Class: Insecta
- Order: Lepidoptera
- Family: Pyralidae
- Genus: Faveria
- Species: F. poliostrota

Binomial name
- Faveria poliostrota (Balinsky, 1994)

Synonyms
- Oligochroa poliostrota Balinsky, 1994

Species of moth

Faveria poliostrota is a species of moth in the family Pyralidae. It was described by Boris Balinsky in 1994 and is found in South Africa.
