= Faveria leucophaeella =

Scientific classification
- Kingdom: Animalia
- Phylum: Arthropoda
- Clade: Pancrustacea
- Class: Insecta
- Order: Lepidoptera
- Family: Pyralidae
- Genus: Faveria
- Species: F. leucophaeella

Binomial name
- Faveria leucophaeella (Zeller, 1867)

Synonyms
- Pempelia leucophaeella Zeller, 1867; Oligochroa leucophaeella; Oligochroa siderella Ragonot, 1888; Epicrocis siderella; Nephopteryx hyemalis Butler, 1880; Oligochroa atratella Ragonot, 1888; Laodamia pernigerella Ragonot, 1889

Species of moth

Faveria leucophaeella is a species of snout moth in the genus Faveria. It was described by Philipp Christoph Zeller in 1867. It is found in South Africa, Australia, Japan, Taiwan and China.
