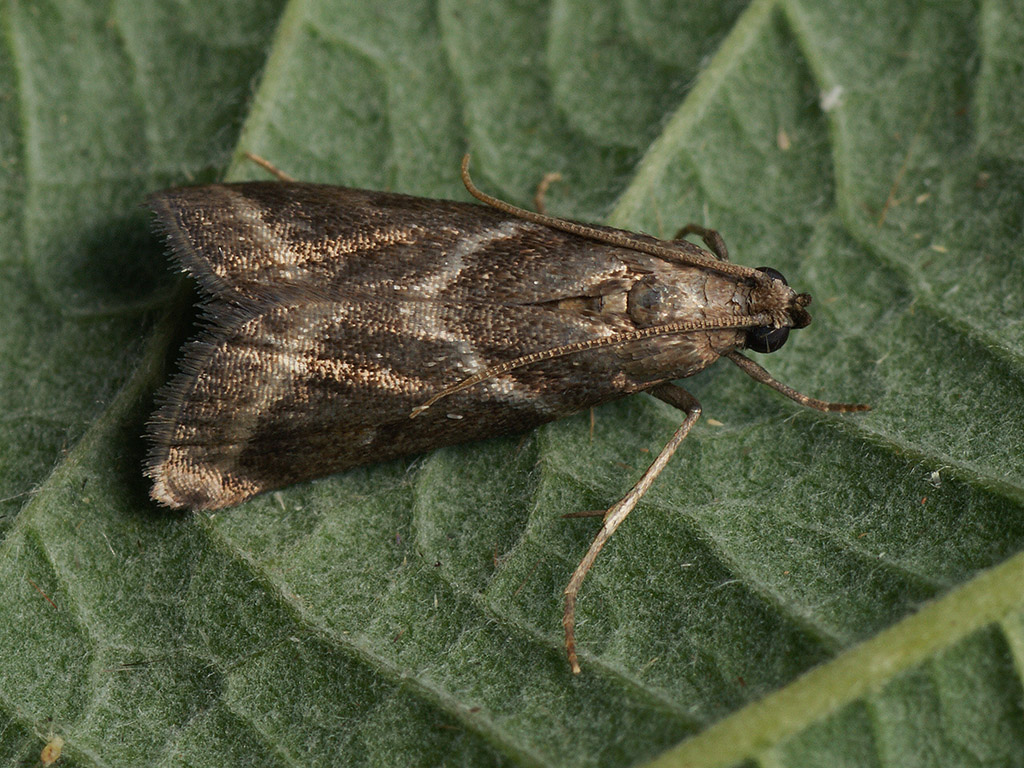

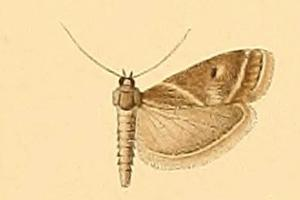

Scientific classification
- Domain: Eukaryota
- Kingdom: Animalia
- Phylum: Arthropoda
- Class: Insecta
- Order: Lepidoptera
- Family: Pyralidae
- Genus: Nyctegretis
- Species: N. triangulella

Binomial name
- Nyctegretis triangulella Ragonot, 1901

Synonyms
- Nyctegretis impossibilella Roesler, 1969

= Nyctegretis triangulella =

Species of moth

Nyctegretis triangulella is a species of snout moth. It is found in Italy, Austria, the Czech Republic, Slovakia, Hungary, Romania and Greece.

The wingspan is 14–17 mm.
