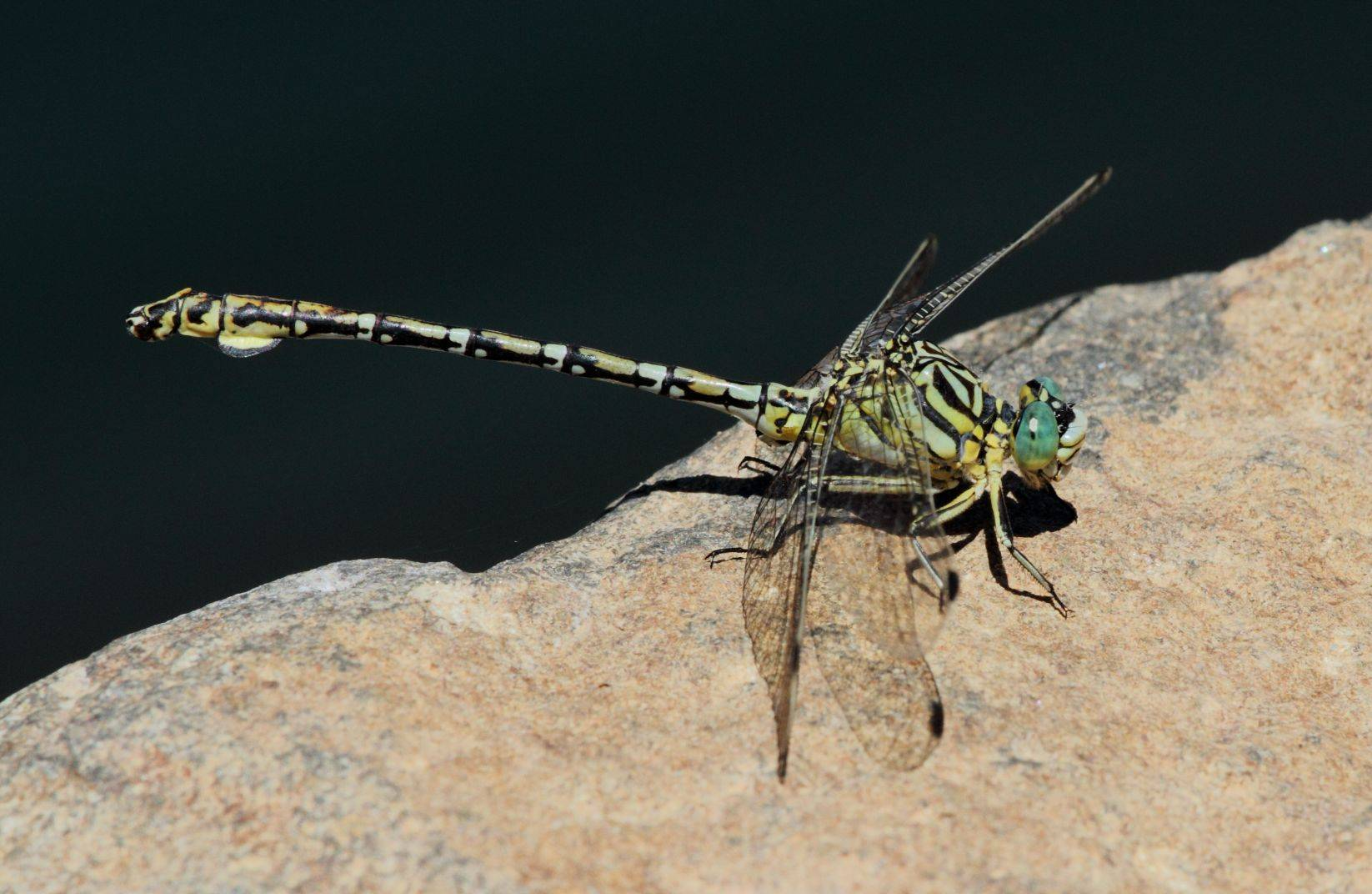
- Male

Conservation status
- Least Concern (IUCN 3.1)

Scientific classification
- Kingdom: Animalia
- Phylum: Arthropoda
- Class: Insecta
- Order: Odonata
- Infraorder: Anisoptera
- Family: Gomphidae
- Genus: Ceratogomphus
- Species: C. pictus

Binomial name
- Ceratogomphus pictus Hagen in Selys, 1854

= Ceratogomphus pictus =

Species of dragonfly

Ceratogomphus pictus, the common thorntail, is a species of dragonfly in the family Gomphidae. It is found in Botswana, Mozambique, Namibia, South Africa, Zimbabwe and possibly the Democratic Republic of Congo (one isolated record from Katanga). Its natural habitats are the edges of large pools and slow-flowing streams.

This dragonfly is 46–53 mm long, with a wingspan of 60–69 mm. The face is yellow with black bands and the eyes are greyish blue. The synthorax has broad grey and greenish-yellow stripes bordered by thin black lines. Segments 1-7 of the abdomen have broken black and yellow rings, and segment 8 has large yellow foliations with black edges. Segment 10 has a sharp, forward-pointing spine that extends over the top of segment 9.

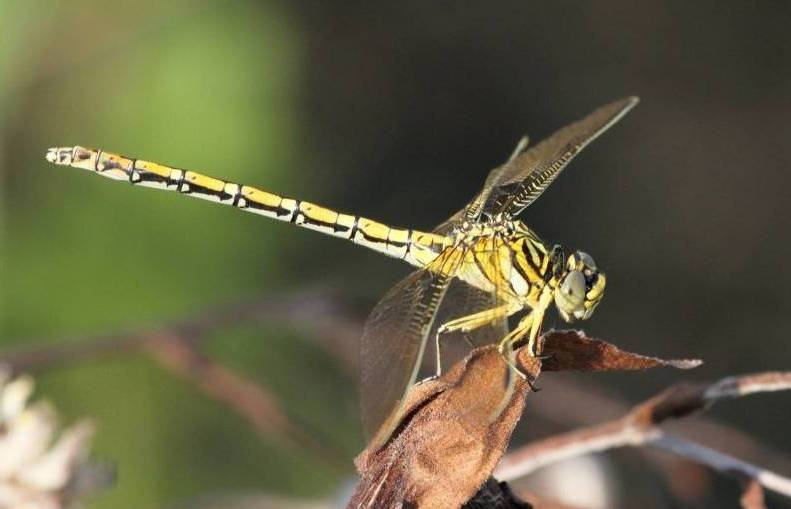
Female common thorntail
