= Candiopella reunionalis =

Scientific classification
- Domain: Eukaryota
- Kingdom: Animalia
- Phylum: Arthropoda
- Class: Insecta
- Order: Lepidoptera
- Family: Pyralidae
- Genus: Candiopella
- Species: C. reunionalis

Binomial name
- Candiopella reunionalis Guillermet, 2007

Species of moth

Candiopella reunionalis is a species of snout moth in the genus Candiopella. It was described by Christian Guillermet in 2007 and is known from Réunion.
