= Trachonitis cristella =

Scientific classification
- Domain: Eukaryota
- Kingdom: Animalia
- Phylum: Arthropoda
- Class: Insecta
- Order: Lepidoptera
- Family: Pyralidae
- Genus: Trachonitis
- Species: T. cristella

Binomial name
- Trachonitis cristella (Denis & Schiffermüller, 1775)

Synonyms
- Tinea cristella Denis & Schiffermüller, 1775; Nephopterix cristalis Hübner, 1825

Species of moth

Trachonitis cristella is a species of snout moth in the genus Trachonitis. It was described by Michael Denis and Ignaz Schiffermüller in 1775, although some sources attribute it to Jacob Hübner. It is found in much of Europe, including Portugal, France, Germany, Switzerland, Austria, Italy, Poland, the Czech Republic, Slovakia, Hungary, Croatia, Bosnia and Herzegovina, North Macedonia, Greece, Romania, Ukraine and Russia.

The wingspan is 20–26 mm.

The larvae feed on Betula species.
