= Afropsipyla pictella =

Scientific classification
- Kingdom: Animalia
- Phylum: Arthropoda
- Clade: Pancrustacea
- Class: Insecta
- Order: Lepidoptera
- Family: Pyralidae
- Genus: Afropsipyla
- Species: A. pictella

Binomial name
- Afropsipyla pictella Balinsky, 1994

Species of moth

Afropsipyla pictella is a species of snout moth in the genus Afropsipyla. It was described by Boris Balinsky in 1994 and is known from Namibia (it was described from Abachaus) and South Africa.
