= Namibicola barrettae =

Scientific classification
- Kingdom: Animalia
- Phylum: Arthropoda
- Class: Insecta
- Order: Lepidoptera
- Family: Pyralidae
- Genus: Namibicola
- Species: N. barrettae

Binomial name
- Namibicola barrettae (Hampson, 1901)

Synonyms
- Megasis barrettae Hampson, 1901

Species of moth

Namibicola barrettae is a species of snout moth in the genus Namibicola. It was described by George Hampson in 1901 and is known from South Africa (including Annshaw, Eastern Cape, the type location).
