= John B. Balinsky =

Ukrainian-born zoologist (1934–1983)

John Boris Balinsky
- Іван (Джон) Балінський
- Born: 4 July 1934; Kyiv, Ukrainian SSR
- Died: 1 October 1983 (aged 49); Ames, Iowa
- Citizenship: USSR (1934–1950); South Africa (1950–1983)
- Education: St. John's College, Johannesburg; University of the Witwatersrand
- Scientific career
- Fields: Biochemistry, zoology
- Workplaces: University of the Witwatersrand; University of London; Columbia University; Iowa State University

John (Ivan) Boris Balinsky (July 4, 1934 in Kyiv – October 1, 1983 in Ames, Iowa) was a Ukrainian-South African zoologist. His father Boris Balinsky was an embryologist.

== Early life ==
Balinsky was born in Kyiv into a family of biologists; his father, Boris Balinsky, was a university professor and his mother, Katia Syngayevskaya, was a laboratory researcher. In 1937, his mother was sentenced to 10 years in a Gulag work camp, as part of Stalin's Great Purge. The sentence was later reduced but she died suddenly in 1943.

Balinsky graduated from St. John's College in Johannesburg, South Africa. He obtained his Bachelors of Science in Zoology and Chemistry in 1955 from the University of Witwatersrand in Johannesburg and a Ph.D. in biochemistry in 1959 from the University of London.

== Career ==
Balinsky studied amphibian physiology. He investigated cell environmental adaptation regulation during development. Balinsky authored 47 research publications, including a chapter in the book "Comparative Biochemistry of Nitrogen Metabolism".

Balinsky also described several species of Echinodermata:

- Ophiactis delagoa JB Balinsky, 1957
- Macrophiothrix mossambica JB Balinsky, 1957
- Amphiura inhacensis JB Balinsky, 1957

== Awards and grants ==
Balinsky received numerous awards and grants, including:

- Witwatersrand Council of Education Overseas Scholarship (1956)
- Nuffield Foundation in dominions (1962)
- Carnegie Corporation of New York (1967)
- U. S. National Institutes of Health International Fellowship (1968)
- South African Council for the scientific and Industrial Research Senior Bursary (1975); and
- Harry Oppenheimer Fellowship Award (1975).

== Membership ==
Balinsky was a member of:

- AAAS
- Biochemical Society
- Royal Society of South Africa
- Physiological Society of Southern Africa; and
- Society for Endocrinology, Metabolism and Diabetes of Southern Africa

He was also the vice-chair from 1974-1975 of the South African Biochemical Society and, from 1973-1974, chair of the Society for Experimental Biology, Transvaal.
