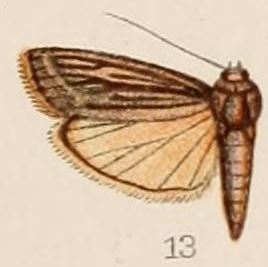

Scientific classification
- Kingdom: Animalia
- Phylum: Arthropoda
- Class: Insecta
- Order: Lepidoptera
- Family: Pyralidae
- Genus: Euzopherodes
- Species: E. albistrigella

Binomial name
- Euzopherodes albistrigella Hampson, 1908

Synonyms
- Radiestra albistrigella

= Euzopherodes albistrigella =

Species of moth

Euzopherodes albistrigella is a species of snout moth in the genus Euzopherodes. It was described by George Hampson in 1908. It is found in Sri Lanka and India.

This species has a wingspan of 30 mm.
