= Ortholepis rectilineella =

Scientific classification
- Domain: Eukaryota
- Kingdom: Animalia
- Phylum: Arthropoda
- Class: Insecta
- Order: Lepidoptera
- Family: Pyralidae
- Genus: Ortholepis
- Species: O. rectilineella

Binomial name
- Ortholepis rectilineella (Ragonot, 1888)

Synonyms
- Salebria rectilineella Ragonot, 1888; Immyrla rectilineella

Species of moth

Ortholepis rectilineella is a species of snout moth in the genus Ortholepis. It was described by Émile Louis Ragonot in 1888. It is found in South Africa.
