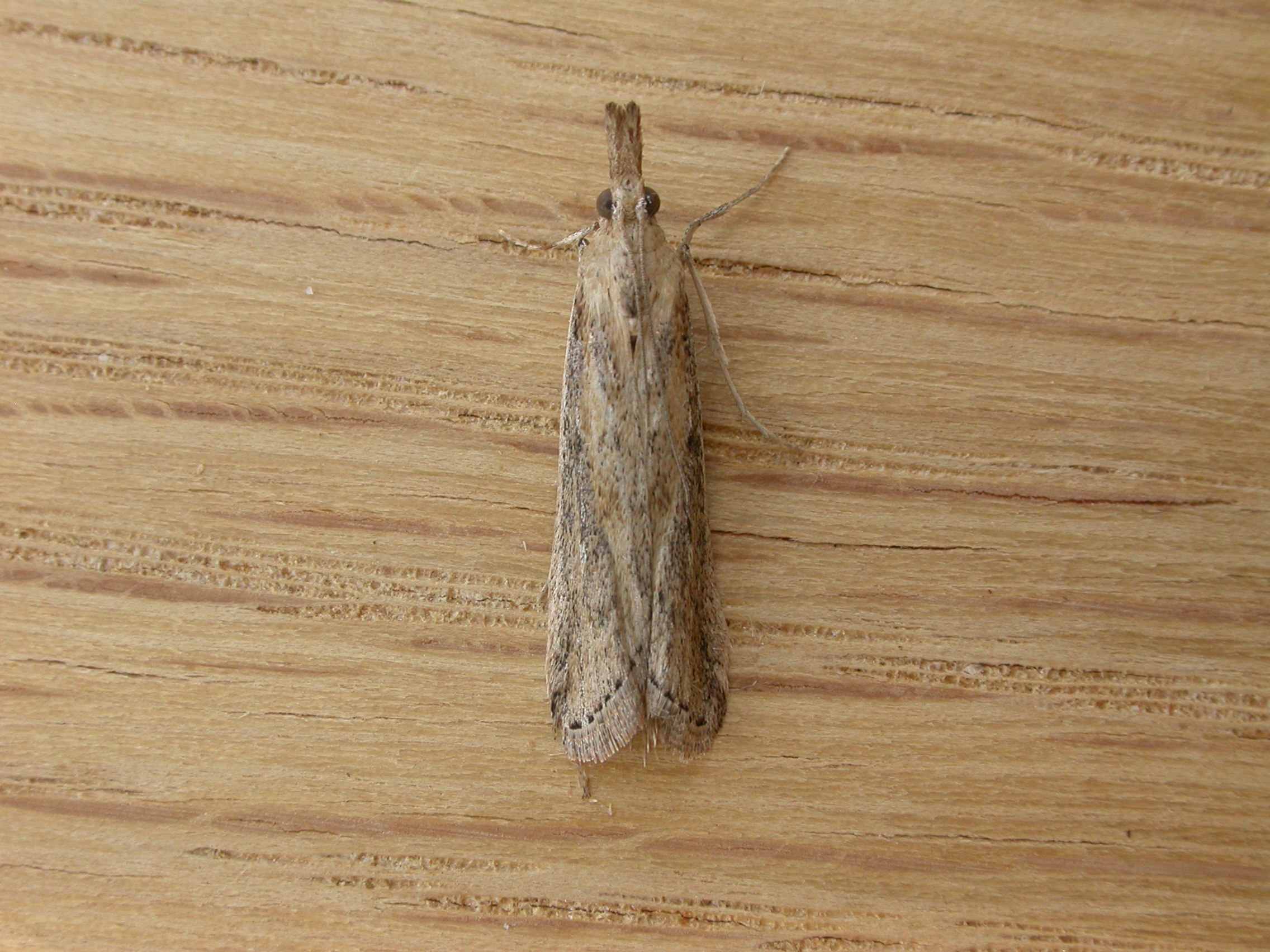

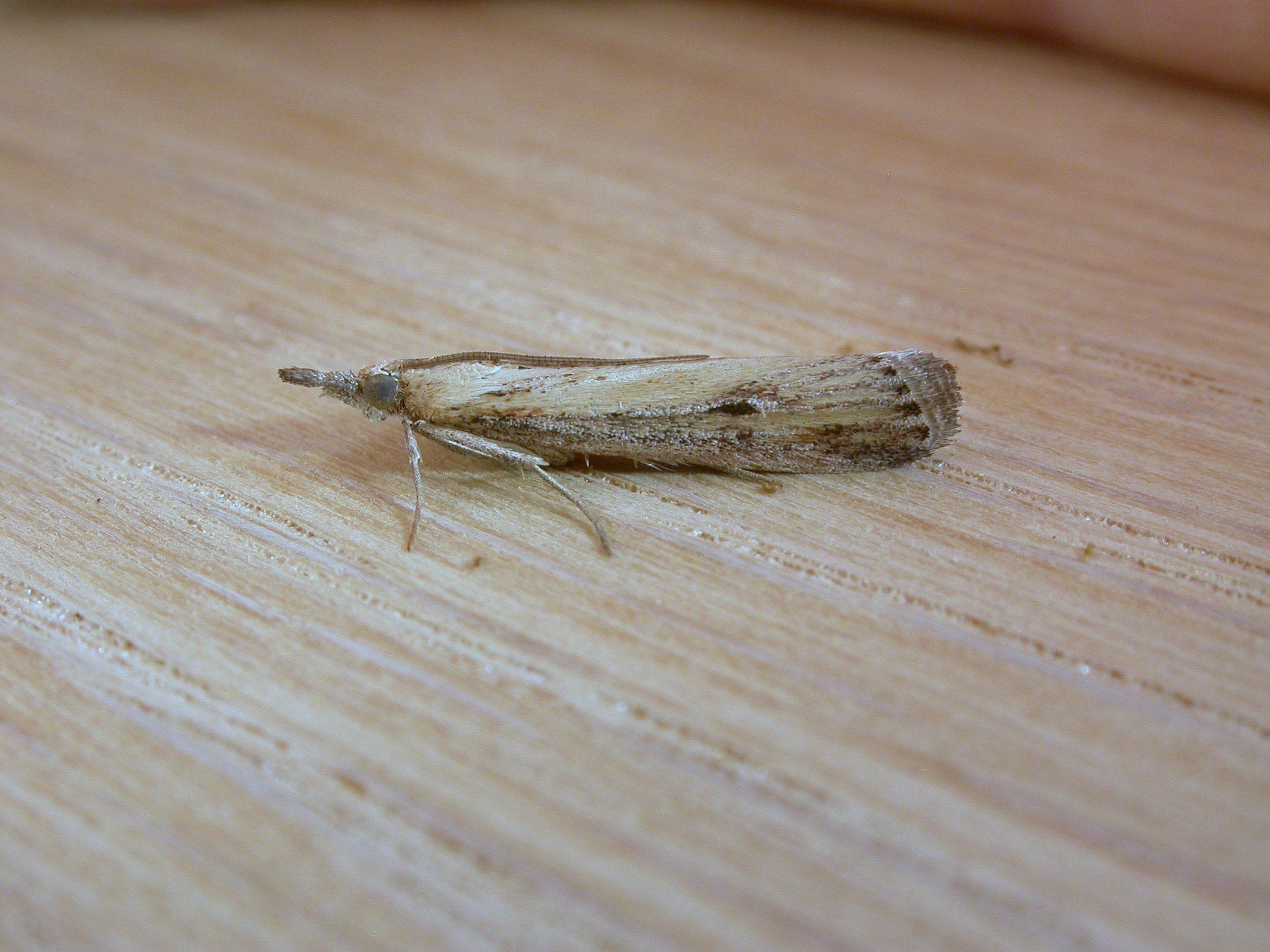

Scientific classification
- Kingdom: Animalia
- Phylum: Arthropoda
- Class: Insecta
- Order: Lepidoptera
- Family: Pyralidae
- Genus: Faveria
- Species: F. tritalis

Binomial name
- Faveria tritalis (Walker, 1863)

Synonyms
- Hypochalcia tritalis Walker, 1863; Crambus cygnosellus Walker, 1866; Eucarphia vulgatella Meyrick, 1879; Eucarphia cnephaeella Meyrick, 1879

= Faveria tritalis =

Species of moth

Faveria tritalis is a moth of the family Pyralidae.

== Distribution ==
It is known from Australia, including Queensland and the Australian Capital Territory, New South Wales and Victoria.

== Description ==
The wingspan is about 20 mm. Adults have forewings with a fawn pattern.

== Habitation ==
The larvae feed on various grasses, including Cynodon dactylon. They live in a silken shelter with incorporated leaves of the food plant.
