= Namibicola palmwagos =

Scientific classification
- Kingdom: Animalia
- Phylum: Arthropoda
- Clade: Pancrustacea
- Class: Insecta
- Order: Lepidoptera
- Family: Pyralidae
- Genus: Namibicola
- Species: N. palmwagos

Binomial name
- Namibicola palmwagos Mey, 2011

Species of moth

Namibicola palmwagos is a species of snout moth in the genus Namibicola. It was described by Wolfram Mey in 2011, and is known from Namibia and South Africa.

The larvae feed on Euphorbia bothae and possibly also on Euphorbia gregaria and Euphorbia damara.
