= Ortholepis jugosella =

Scientific classification
- Domain: Eukaryota
- Kingdom: Animalia
- Phylum: Arthropoda
- Class: Insecta
- Order: Lepidoptera
- Family: Pyralidae
- Genus: Ortholepis
- Species: O. jugosella

Binomial name
- Ortholepis jugosella Ragonot, 1887

Species of moth

Ortholepis jugosella is a moth of the family Pyralidae. It was described by Émile Louis Ragonot in 1887. It is found in North America, including Maine, North Carolina and Tennessee.
