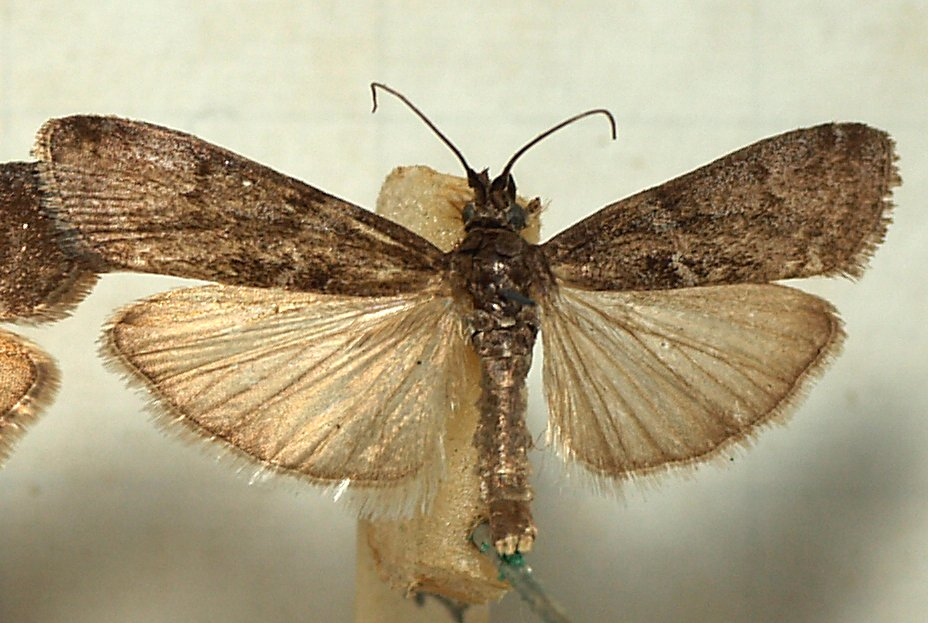
- Ortholepis betulae

Scientific classification
- Domain: Eukaryota
- Kingdom: Animalia
- Phylum: Arthropoda
- Class: Insecta
- Order: Lepidoptera
- Family: Pyralidae
- Tribe: Phycitini
- Genus: Ortholepis; Ragonot, 1887

Synonyms
- Metriostola Ragonot, 1893

= Ortholepis =

Genus of moths

Ortholepis is a genus of moths of the family Pyralidae described by Émile Louis Ragonot in 1887.

== Species ==
- Ortholepis baloghi Neunzig, 2003
- Ortholepis betulae (Goeze, 1776)
- Ortholepis cretaciella de Joannis, 1927
- Ortholepis jugosella Ragonot, 1887
- Ortholepis myricella McDunnough, 1958
- Ortholepis pasadamia (Dyar, 1917)
- Ortholepis polyodonta Balinsky, 1991
- Ortholepis pyrobasis Balinsky, 1991
- Ortholepis rectilineella (Ragonot, 1888)
- Ortholepis rhodorella McDunnough, 1958
- Ortholepis subgenistella (Hampson, 1901)
- Ortholepis vacciniella (Lienig & Zeller, 1846)
