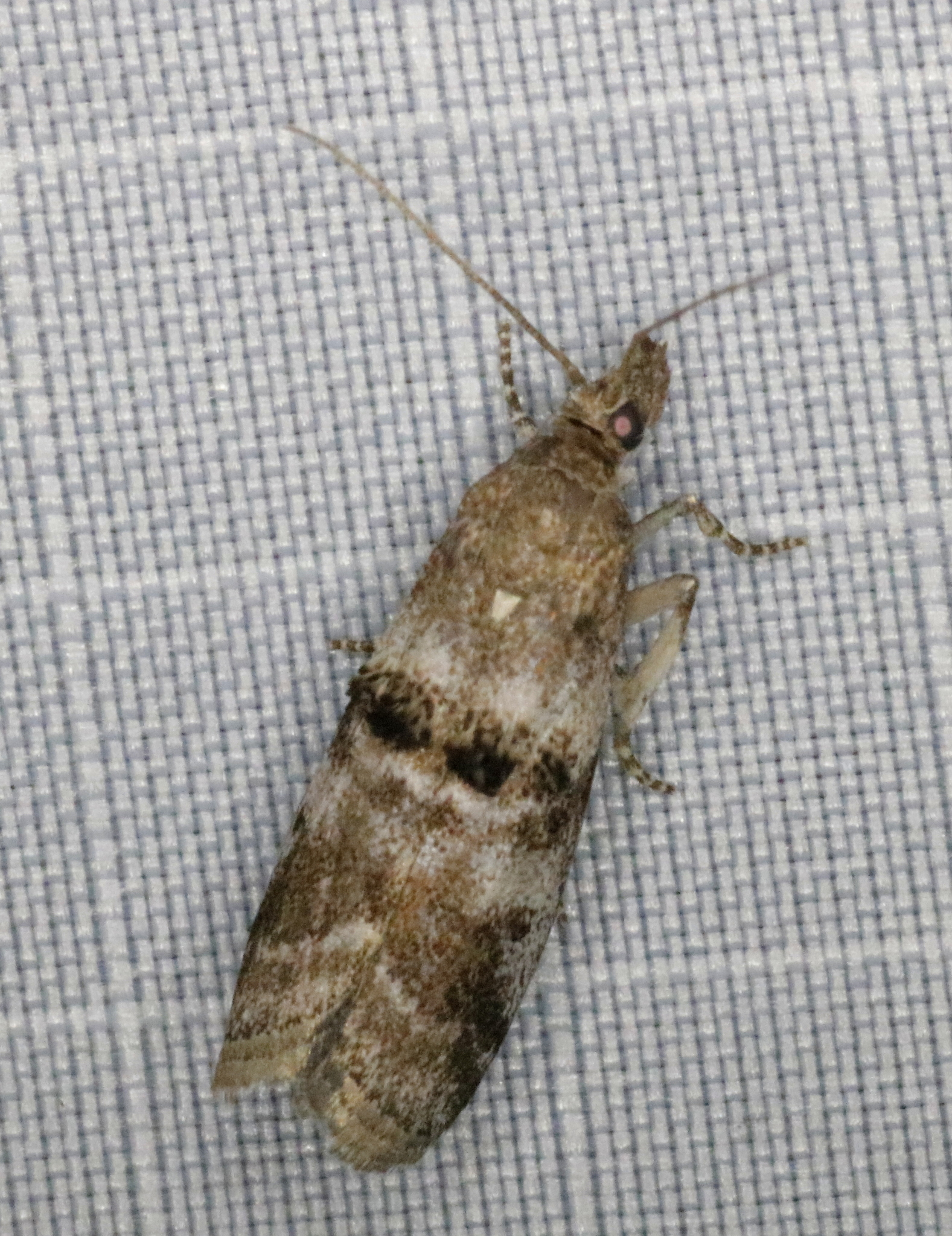

Scientific classification
- Kingdom: Animalia
- Phylum: Arthropoda
- Class: Insecta
- Order: Lepidoptera
- Family: Pyralidae
- Genus: Ortholepis
- Species: O. rhodorella

Binomial name
- Ortholepis rhodorella McDunnough, 1958

= Ortholepis rhodorella =

Species of moth

Ortholepis rhodorella is a species of moth in the family Pyralidae. It was first described by James Halliday McDunnough in 1958. It is found in North America, including Maine and Nova Scotia.

The wingspan is about 17 mm.
