= Faveria dionysia =

Scientific classification
- Kingdom: Animalia
- Phylum: Arthropoda
- Clade: Pancrustacea
- Class: Insecta
- Order: Lepidoptera
- Family: Pyralidae
- Genus: Faveria
- Species: F. dionysia

Binomial name
- Faveria dionysia (Zeller, 1846)

Synonyms
- Pempelia dionysia Zeller, 1846; Oligochroa terrella Ragonot, 1888

Species of moth

Faveria dionysia is a species of moth in the family Pyralidae. It was described by Zeller in 1846. It is found in Spain, Portugal, Italy, Greece, Iraq, Namibia, South Africa, Gambia and the United Arab Emirates.
