= Faveria nigrilinea =

Scientific classification
- Domain: Eukaryota
- Kingdom: Animalia
- Phylum: Arthropoda
- Class: Insecta
- Order: Lepidoptera
- Family: Pyralidae
- Genus: Faveria
- Species: F. nigrilinea

Binomial name
- Faveria nigrilinea (de Joannis, 1927)

Synonyms
- Ilithyia nigrilinea de Joannis, 1927

Species of moth

Faveria nigrilinea is a species of moth in the family Pyralidae. It was described by Joseph de Joannis in 1927. It is found in Mozambique.
