= Ortholepis pyrobasis =

Scientific classification
- Domain: Eukaryota
- Kingdom: Animalia
- Phylum: Arthropoda
- Class: Insecta
- Order: Lepidoptera
- Family: Pyralidae
- Genus: Ortholepis
- Species: O. pyrobasis

Binomial name
- Ortholepis pyrobasis Balinsky, 1991

Species of moth

Ortholepis pyrobasis is a moth of the family Pyralidae. It was described by Boris Balinsky in 1991 and is found in South Africa.
