= Namibicola karios =

Scientific classification
- Kingdom: Animalia
- Phylum: Arthropoda
- Clade: Pancrustacea
- Class: Insecta
- Order: Lepidoptera
- Family: Pyralidae
- Genus: Namibicola
- Species: N. karios

Binomial name
- Namibicola karios Mey, 2011

Species of moth

Namibicola karios is a species of snout moth in the genus Namibicola. It was described by Wolfram Mey in 2011 and is known from Namibia (including Karas, the type location).
