= Faveria minutella =

Scientific classification
- Domain: Eukaryota
- Kingdom: Animalia
- Phylum: Arthropoda
- Class: Insecta
- Order: Lepidoptera
- Family: Pyralidae
- Genus: Faveria
- Species: F. minutella

Binomial name
- Faveria minutella (Ragonot, 1885)

Synonyms
- Salebria minutella Ragonot, 1885

Species of moth

Faveria minutella is a species of moth in the family Pyralidae. It was described by Ragonot in 1885. It is found in Sri Lanka.
