= Bahiria =

Scientific classification
- Domain: Eukaryota
- Kingdom: Animalia
- Phylum: Arthropoda
- Class: Insecta
- Order: Lepidoptera
- Family: Pyralidae
- Subfamily: Phycitinae
- Tribe: Phycitini
- Genus: Bahiria; Balinsky, 1994

Genus of moths

Bahiria is a genus of snout moths. It was erected by Boris Balinsky in 1994.

== Species ==
- Bahiria defecta Balinsky, 1994
- Bahiria durbanica Balinsky, 1994
- Bahiria flavicosta Balinsky, 1994
- Bahiria latevalvata Balinsky, 1994
- Bahiria macrognatha Balinsky, 1994
- Bahiria magma Balinsky, 1994
- Bahiria maytenella Yamanaka, 2004
- Bahiria similis Balinsky, 1994
- Bahiria ximanianata Balinsky, 1994
