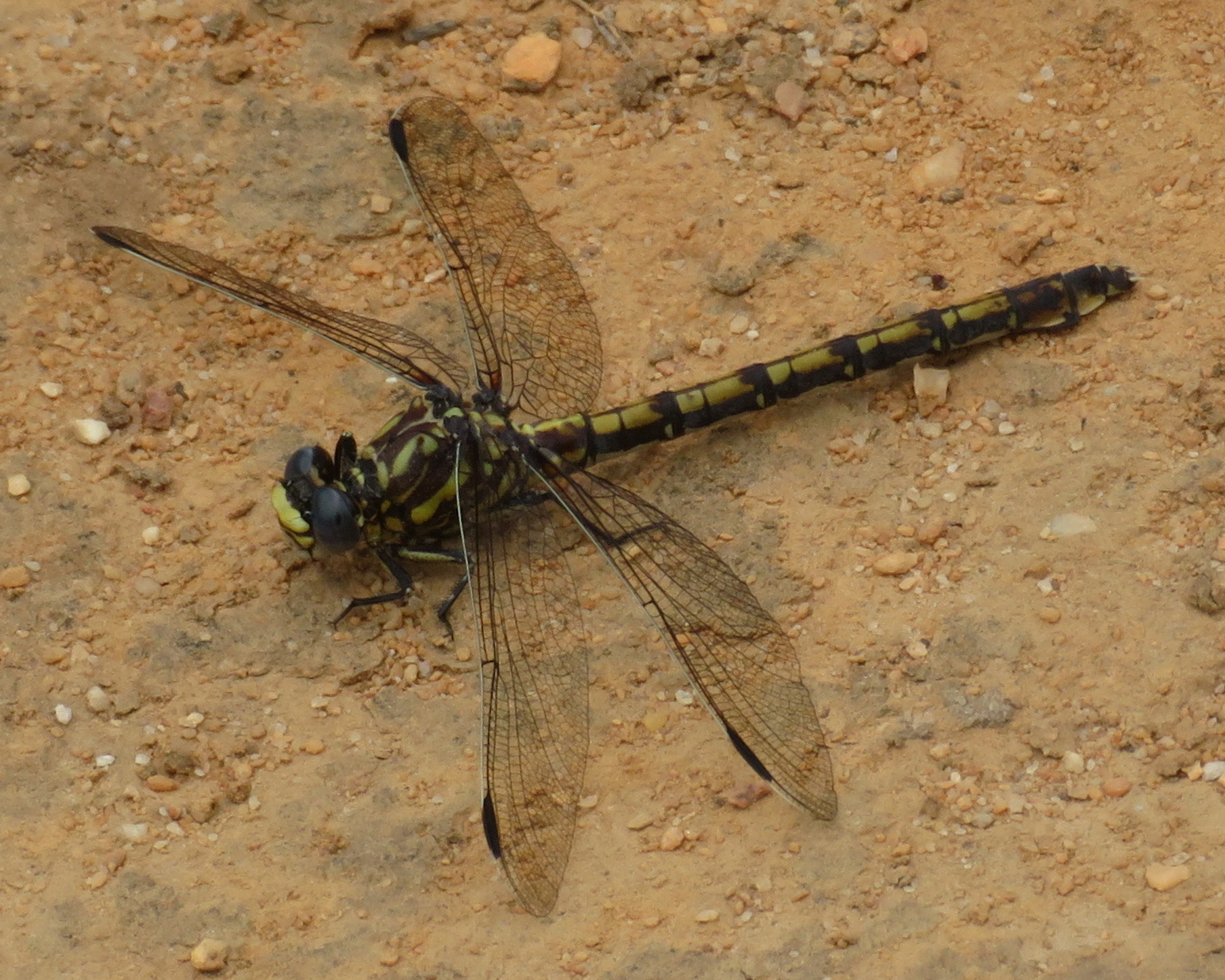

Conservation status
- Near Threatened (IUCN 3.1)

Scientific classification
- Kingdom: Animalia
- Phylum: Arthropoda
- Class: Insecta
- Order: Odonata
- Infraorder: Anisoptera
- Family: Gomphidae
- Genus: Ceratogomphus
- Species: C. triceraticus

Binomial name
- Ceratogomphus triceraticus Balinsky, 1963

= Ceratogomphus triceraticus =

Species of dragonfly

Ceratogomphus triceraticus is a species of dragonfly in the family Gomphidae. It is endemic to South Africa. Its natural habitat is rivers. It is threatened by habitat loss.
