= Euzopherodes lutisignella =

Scientific classification
- Domain: Eukaryota
- Kingdom: Animalia
- Phylum: Arthropoda
- Class: Insecta
- Order: Lepidoptera
- Family: Pyralidae
- Genus: Euzopherodes
- Species: E. lutisignella

Binomial name
- Euzopherodes lutisignella (J. J. Mann, 1869)

Synonyms
- Myelois lutisignella J. J. Mann, 1869; Lydia lutisignella; Infinita lutisignella

Species of moth

Euzopherodes lutisignella is a species of snout moth in the genus Euzopherodes. It was described by Josef Johann Mann in 1869. It is found in Slovenia, Croatia, Albania, Greece, Turkey, Bulgaria, Romania, Russia and on Sicily. It has also been recorded from Kyrgyzstan.
