= Euzopherodes liturosella =

Scientific classification
- Domain: Eukaryota
- Kingdom: Animalia
- Phylum: Arthropoda
- Class: Insecta
- Order: Lepidoptera
- Family: Pyralidae
- Genus: Euzopherodes
- Species: E. liturosella

Binomial name
- Euzopherodes liturosella (Erschoff, 1874)

Synonyms
- Myelois liturosella Erschoff, 1874

Species of moth

Euzopherodes liturosella is a species of snout moth in the genus Euzopherodes. It was described by Nikolay Grigoryevich Erschoff in 1874. It is found in Turkmenistan.
