= Ancylosis mimeugraphella =

Scientific classification
- Kingdom: Animalia
- Phylum: Arthropoda
- Class: Insecta
- Order: Lepidoptera
- Family: Pyralidae
- Genus: Ancylosis
- Species: A. mimeugraphella

Binomial name
- Ancylosis mimeugraphella (Balinsky, 1989)

Synonyms
- Staudingeria mimeugraphella Balinsky, 1989

Species of moth

Ancylosis mimeugraphella is a species of snout moth in the genus Ancylosis. It was described by Boris Balinsky in 1989 and is found in South Africa and Namibia.
