= Euzopherodes allocrossa =

Scientific classification
- Domain: Eukaryota
- Kingdom: Animalia
- Phylum: Arthropoda
- Class: Insecta
- Order: Lepidoptera
- Family: Pyralidae
- Genus: Euzopherodes
- Species: E. allocrossa

Binomial name
- Euzopherodes allocrossa Lower, 1903

Synonyms
- Euzopherodes concinella Turner, 1947

Species of moth

Euzopherodes allocrossa is a species of snout moth in the genus Euzopherodes. It was described by Oswald Bertram Lower in 1903 and is found in Australia.
