= Ancylosis similis =

Scientific classification
- Domain: Eukaryota
- Kingdom: Animalia
- Phylum: Arthropoda
- Class: Insecta
- Order: Lepidoptera
- Family: Pyralidae
- Genus: Ancylosis
- Species: A. similis

Binomial name
- Ancylosis similis Balinsky, 1987

Species of moth

Ancylosis similis is a species of snout moth in the genus Ancylosis. It was described by Boris Balinsky in 1987 and is known from South Africa.
