= Euzopherodes oberleae =

Scientific classification
- Domain: Eukaryota
- Kingdom: Animalia
- Phylum: Arthropoda
- Class: Insecta
- Order: Lepidoptera
- Family: Pyralidae
- Genus: Euzopherodes
- Species: E. oberleae

Binomial name
- Euzopherodes oberleae Roesler, 1973

Species of moth

Euzopherodes oberleae is a species of snout moth in the genus Euzopherodes. It was described by Roesler in 1973 and is known from Japan.
