= Encryphodes =

Scientific classification
- Domain: Eukaryota
- Kingdom: Animalia
- Phylum: Arthropoda
- Class: Insecta
- Order: Lepidoptera
- Family: Pyralidae
- Tribe: Phycitini
- Genus: Encryphodes; Turner, 1913

Genus of moths

Encryphodes is a genus of snout moths. It was described by Alfred Jefferis Turner in 1913.

== Species ==
- Encryphodes aenictopa Turner, 1913
- Encryphodes ethiopella Balinsky, 1991
