= Nyctegretis ruminella =

Scientific classification
- Domain: Eukaryota
- Kingdom: Animalia
- Phylum: Arthropoda
- Class: Insecta
- Order: Lepidoptera
- Family: Pyralidae
- Genus: Nyctegretis
- Species: N. ruminella

Binomial name
- Nyctegretis ruminella La Harpe, 1860

Species of moth

Nyctegretis ruminella is a species of snout moth. It is found in France, Spain, on Sardinia, Corsica and Sicily and in Romania and Bulgaria.
