= Afromyelois =

Scientific classification
- Kingdom: Animalia
- Phylum: Arthropoda
- Clade: Pancrustacea
- Class: Insecta
- Order: Lepidoptera
- Family: Pyralidae
- Subfamily: Phycitinae
- Genus: Afromyelois; Balinsky, 1991
- Species: A. communis

Binomial name
- Afromyelois communis Balinsky, 1991

Genus of moths

Afromyelois is a monotypic snout moth genus described by Boris Balinsky in 1991. It contains the single species Afromyelois communis, described by the same author, which is found in South Africa.
