= Faveria mundalis =

Scientific classification
- Kingdom: Animalia
- Phylum: Arthropoda
- Class: Insecta
- Order: Lepidoptera
- Family: Pyralidae
- Genus: Faveria
- Species: F. mundalis

Binomial name
- Faveria mundalis (Walker, 1863)

Synonyms
- Nephopteryx mundalis Walker, 1863

Species of moth

Faveria mundalis is a species of moth in the family Pyralidae. It was described by Francis Walker in 1863. It is found on Seram Island.
