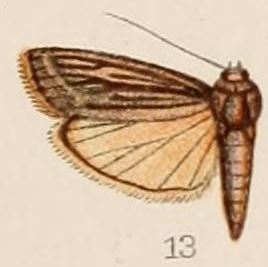
- Euzopherodes albistrigella

Scientific classification
- Kingdom: Animalia
- Phylum: Arthropoda
- Class: Insecta
- Order: Lepidoptera
- Family: Pyralidae
- Subfamily: Phycitinae
- Tribe: Phycitini
- Genus: Euzopherodes; Hampson, 1899

Synonyms
- Lydia Rebel, 1901 (preocc.); Lydia Hampson, 1901 (preocc.); Phloeophaga Chrétien, 1911; Phlocophaga Amsel, 1935; Radiestra Hampson, 1927; Neononia Hampson, 1930; Symphestia Hampson, 1930; Trigonopyralis Amsel, 1935; Nyctigenes Meyrick, 1937; Epilydia Amsel, 1954; Delattinia Roesler, 1965; Infinita Whalley, 1970; Euzopherades Hampson, 1927

= Euzopherodes =

Genus of moths

Euzopherodes is a genus of snout moths. It was described by George Hampson in 1899.

== Species ==
- Euzopherodes albicans Hampson, 1899
- Euzopherodes albistrigella Hampson, 1908
- Euzopherodes allocrossa Lower, 1903
- Euzopherodes capicola Balinsky, 1994
- Euzopherodes charlottae Rebel, 1914
- Euzopherodes ephestialis Hampson, 1903
- Euzopherodes euphrontis (Meyrick, 1937)
- Euzopherodes homocapna Turner, 1947
- Euzopherodes keltella Amsel, 1935
- Euzopherodes lutisignella (Mann, 1869)
- Euzopherodes liturosella (Erschoff, 1874)
- Euzopherodes nipponensis Yamanaka, 2006
- Euzopherodes oberleae Roesler, 1973
- Euzopherodes pusilla Mabille, 1906
- Euzopherodes taprobalis Hampson, 1908
- Euzopherodes vapidella (Mann, 1857)
