= Euzopherodes keltella =

Scientific classification
- Domain: Eukaryota
- Kingdom: Animalia
- Phylum: Arthropoda
- Class: Insecta
- Order: Lepidoptera
- Family: Pyralidae
- Genus: Euzopherodes
- Species: E. keltella

Binomial name
- Euzopherodes keltella (Amsel, 1935)

Synonyms
- Trigonopyralis keltella Amsel, 1935

Species of moth

Euzopherodes keltella is a species of snout moth in the genus Euzopherodes. It was described by Hans Georg Amsel in 1935. It is found in the Palestinian territories and Israel.
