= Euzopherodes pusilla =

Scientific classification
- Domain: Eukaryota
- Kingdom: Animalia
- Phylum: Arthropoda
- Class: Insecta
- Order: Lepidoptera
- Family: Pyralidae
- Genus: Euzopherodes
- Species: E. pusilla

Binomial name
- Euzopherodes pusilla (Mabille, 1906)

Synonyms
- Euzophera pusilla Mabille, 1906; Metalosticha cinnamomea Rothschild, 1915

Species of moth

Euzopherodes pusilla is a species of snout moth in the genus Euzopherodes. It was described by Paul Mabille in 1906. It is found in Algeria.
