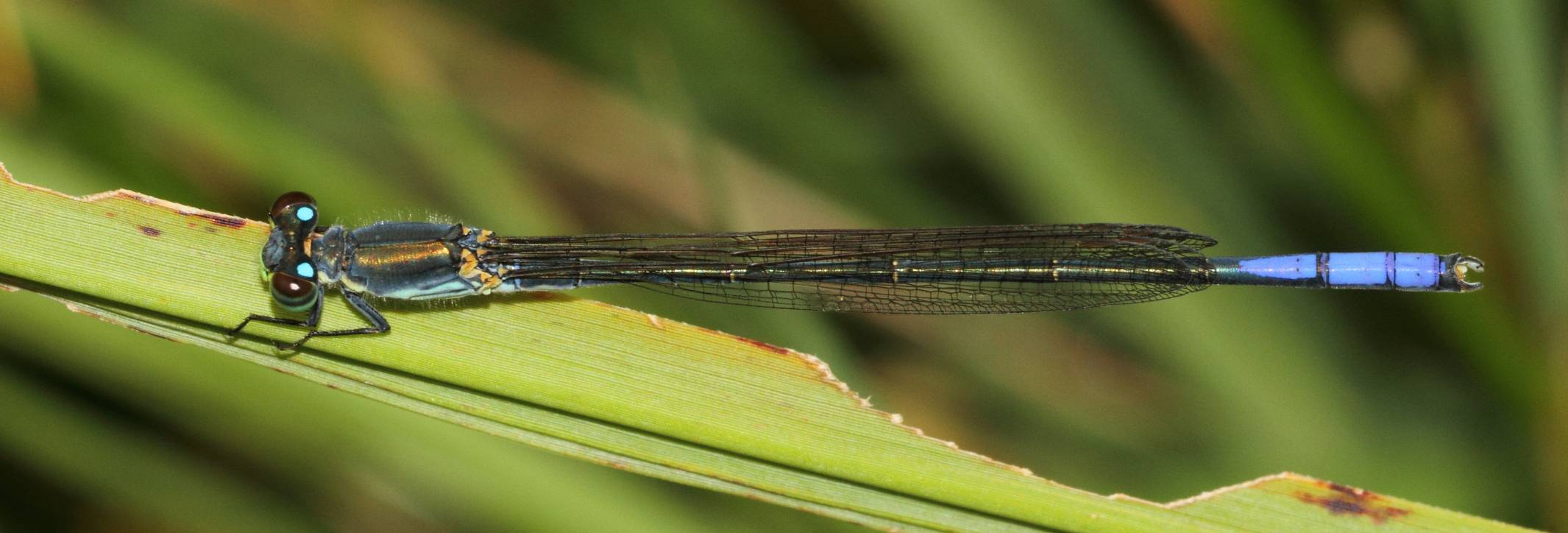
- Male

Conservation status
- Near Threatened (IUCN 3.1)

Scientific classification
- Kingdom: Animalia
- Phylum: Arthropoda
- Clade: Pancrustacea
- Class: Insecta
- Order: Odonata
- Suborder: Zygoptera
- Family: Coenagrionidae
- Genus: Pseudagrion
- Species: P. inopinatum

Binomial name
- Pseudagrion inopinatum Balinsky, 1971

= Pseudagrion inopinatum =

Species of damselfly

Pseudagrion inopinatum, the Badplaas sprite or Balinsky's sprite is a species of damselfly in the family Coenagrionidae. It is endemic to South Africa. Its natural habitats include open rivers with abundant marginal vegetation.
