= Encryphodes ethiopella =

Scientific classification
- Domain: Eukaryota
- Kingdom: Animalia
- Phylum: Arthropoda
- Class: Insecta
- Order: Lepidoptera
- Family: Pyralidae
- Genus: Encryphodes
- Species: E. ethiopella

Binomial name
- Encryphodes ethiopella Balinsky, 1991

Species of moth

Encryphodes ethiopella is a species of snout moth. It was described by Boris Balinsky in 1991 and is found in South Africa.
