= Namibicola =

Scientific classification
- Domain: Eukaryota
- Kingdom: Animalia
- Phylum: Arthropoda
- Class: Insecta
- Order: Lepidoptera
- Family: Pyralidae
- Subfamily: Phycitinae
- Genus: Namibicola; Balinsky, 1991

Genus of moths

Namibicola is a genus of snout moths described by Boris Balinsky in 1991.

== Species ==
- Namibicola barrettae (Hampson, 1901)
- Namibicola karios Mey, 2011
- Namibicola palmwagos Mey, 2011
- Namibicola simplex Balinsky, 1994
- Namibicola splendida Balinsky, 1991
