= Euzopherodes capicola =

Scientific classification
- Kingdom: Animalia
- Phylum: Arthropoda
- Class: Insecta
- Order: Lepidoptera
- Family: Pyralidae
- Genus: Euzopherodes
- Species: E. capicola

Binomial name
- Euzopherodes capicola Balinsky, 1994

Species of moth

Euzopherodes capicola is a species of snout moth in the genus Euzopherodes. It was described by Boris Balinsky in 1994 and is found in Namibia and South Africa.
