= Ortholepis polyodonta =

Scientific classification
- Domain: Eukaryota
- Kingdom: Animalia
- Phylum: Arthropoda
- Class: Insecta
- Order: Lepidoptera
- Family: Pyralidae
- Genus: Ortholepis
- Species: O. polyodonta

Binomial name
- Ortholepis polyodonta Balinsky, 1991

Species of moth

Ortholepis polyodonta is a moth of the family Pyralidae. It was described by Boris Balinsky in 1991 and is found in South Africa.
