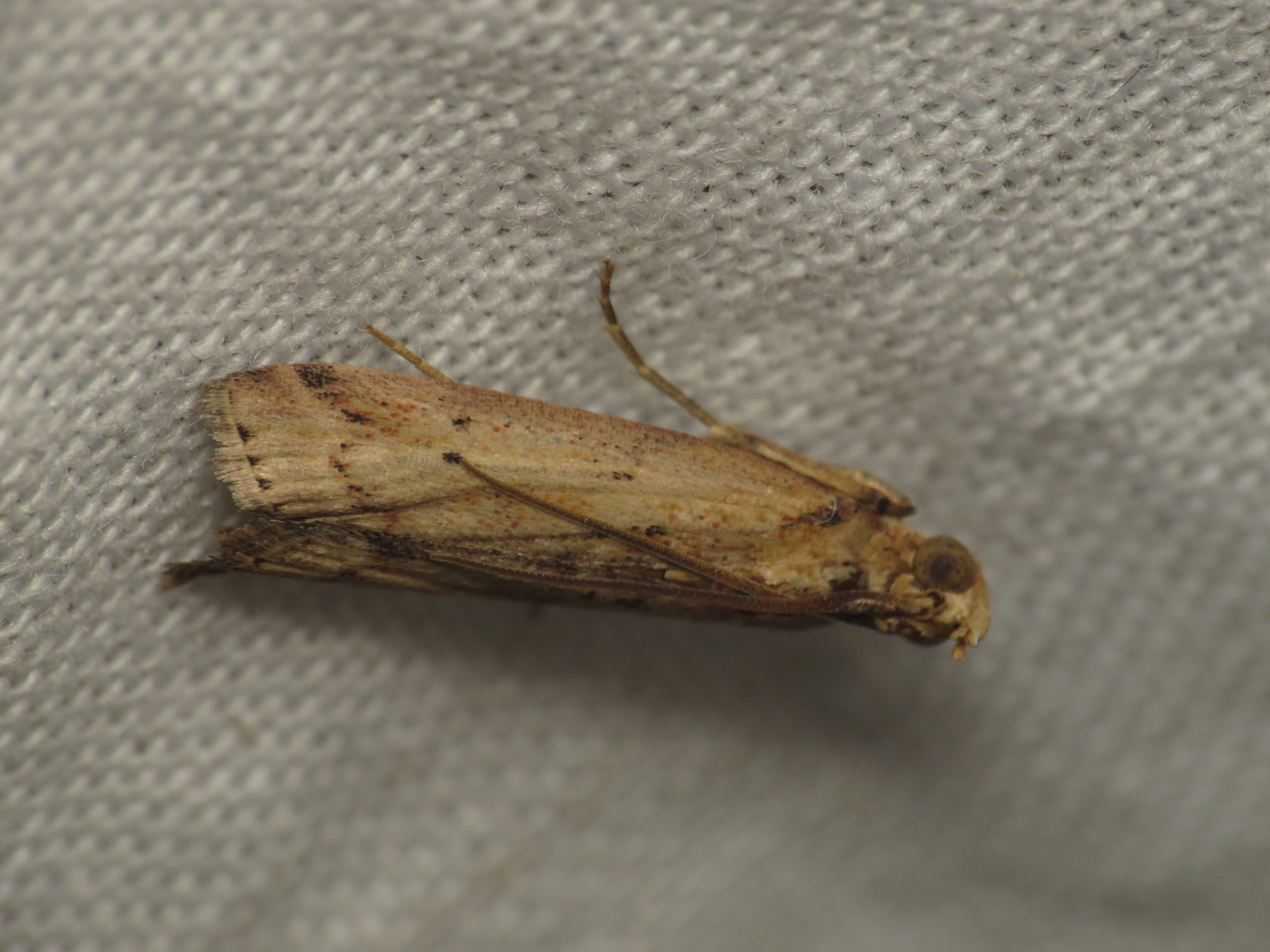

Scientific classification
- Kingdom: Animalia
- Phylum: Arthropoda
- Class: Insecta
- Order: Lepidoptera
- Family: Pyralidae
- Genus: Faveria
- Species: F. laiasalis

Binomial name
- Faveria laiasalis Walker, 1859

Synonyms
- Trachonitis sublignalis Walker, 1863; Nephopteryx patulalis Walker, 1863; Pempelia strigiferella Meyrick, 1879; Pempelia rufitinctella Meyrick, 1879; Nephopteryx epicrypha Turner, 1904

= Faveria laiasalis =

Species of moth

Faveria laiasalis is a species of moth of the family Pyralidae. It was found by Francis Walker in 1859 and is found in Queensland, Australia.

The larvae have been reared on Cynodon dactylon.
