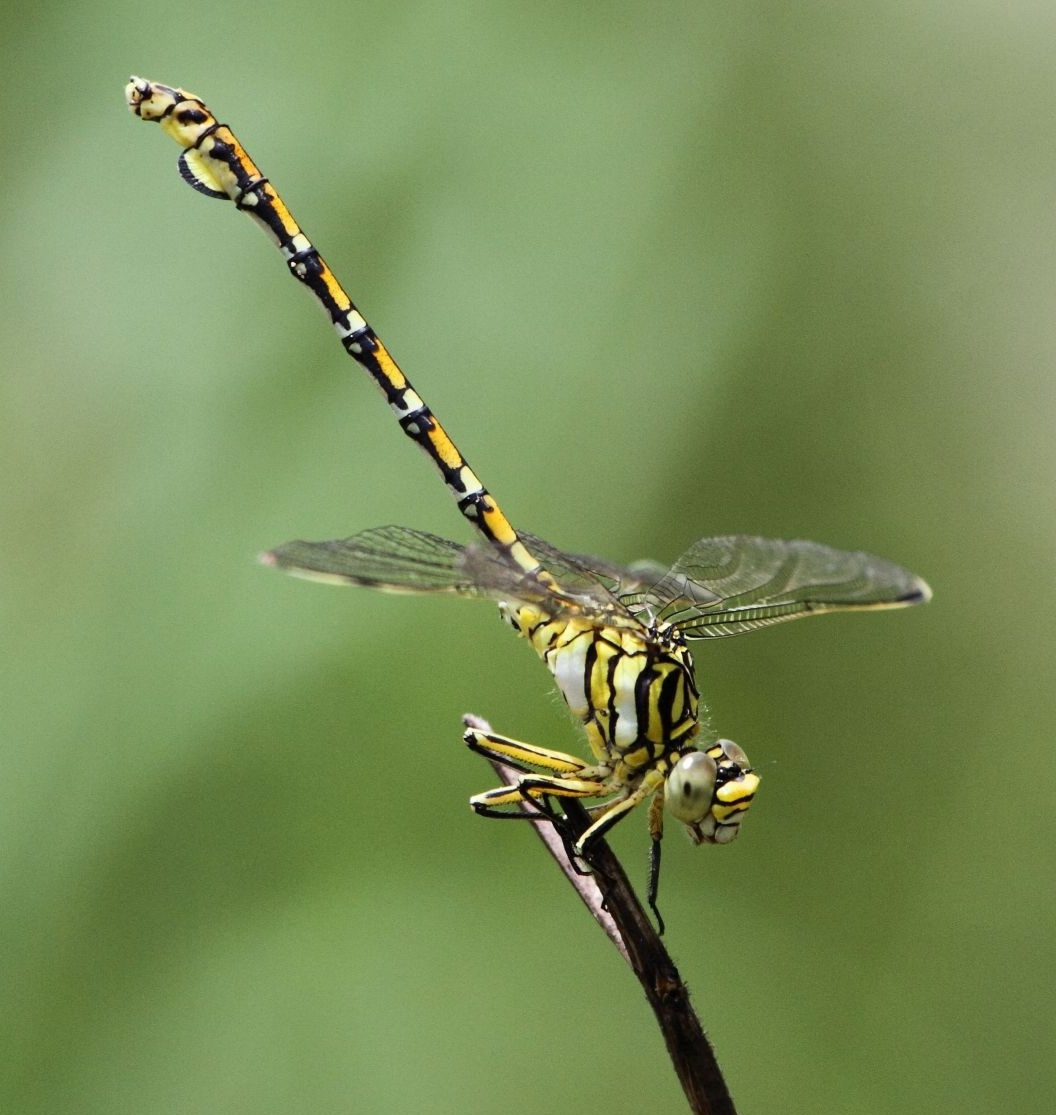
- Ceratogomphus pictus

Scientific classification
- Kingdom: Animalia
- Phylum: Arthropoda
- Class: Insecta
- Order: Odonata
- Infraorder: Anisoptera
- Family: Gomphidae
- Genus: Ceratogomphus; Selys, 1854

= Ceratogomphus =

Genus of dragonflies

Ceratogomphus, commonly known as thorntails, is a small genus of dragonfly in the family Gomphidae found in southern Africa. The genus contains only two species:

- Ceratogomphus pictus Hagen in Selys, 1854 – common thorntail
- Ceratogomphus triceraticus Balinsky, 1963 – cape thorntail
