= Afropsipyla similis =

Scientific classification
- Kingdom: Animalia
- Phylum: Arthropoda
- Clade: Pancrustacea
- Class: Insecta
- Order: Lepidoptera
- Family: Pyralidae
- Genus: Afropsipyla
- Species: A. similis

Binomial name
- Afropsipyla similis Balinsky, 1994

Species of moth

Afropsipyla similis is a species of snout moth in the genus Afropsipyla. It was described by Boris Balinsky in 1994 and is known from South Africa (it was described from Johannesburg).
