= Valentyna Radzymovska =

- Валентина Радзимовська
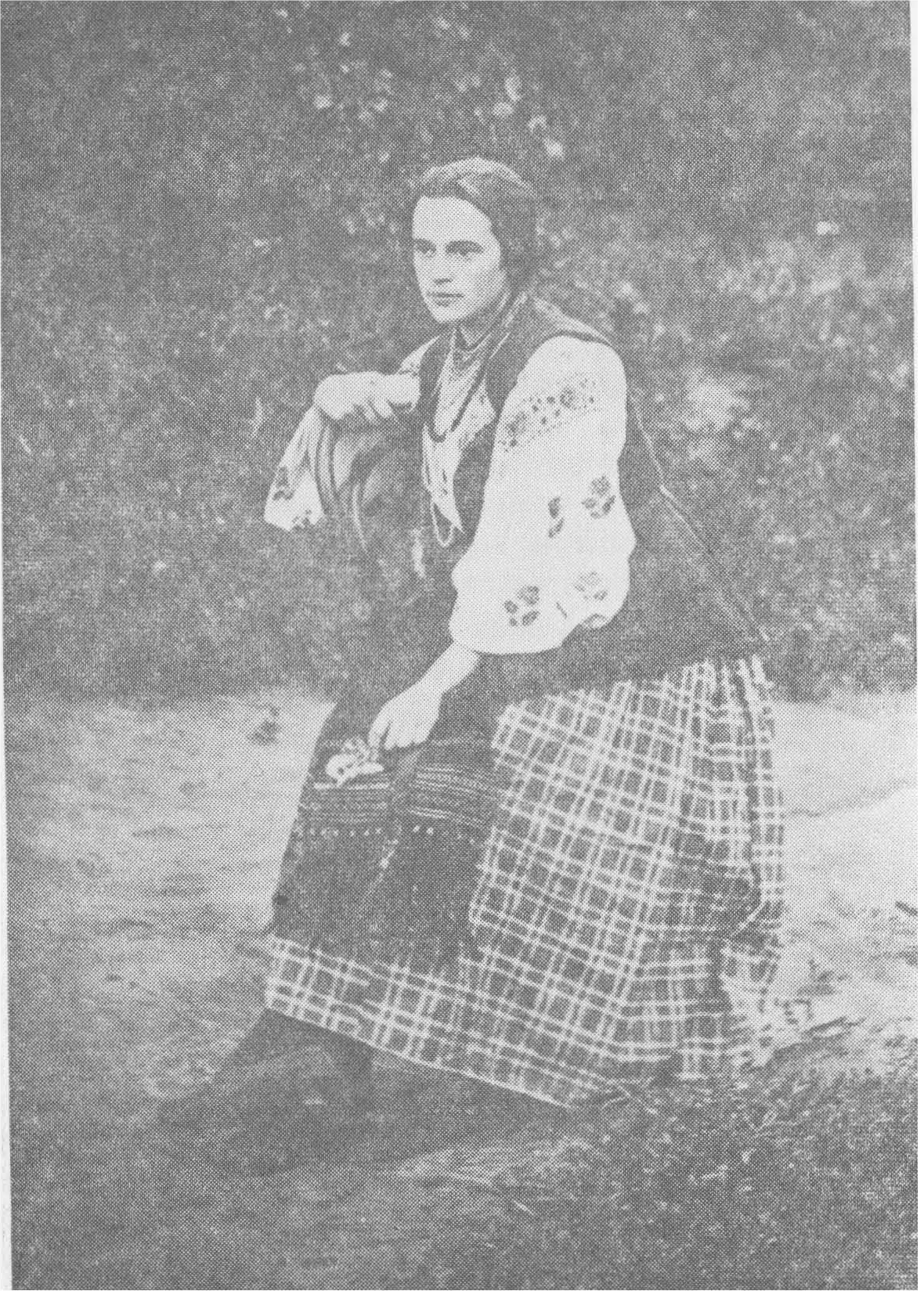
- Born: Valentyna Yanovska; 13 October 1886; Matiashivka, Poltava Governorate, Russian Empire
- Died: 22 December 1953 (aged 67); Champaign, Illinois, United States

Valentyna Radzymovska (Ukrainian: Валентина Радзимовська; October 1, 1886 – December 22, 1953) was a Ukrainian biologist who made significant contributions to the fields of physiology, biochemistry, and medicine. Despite being erased from the Soviet history books, Radzymovska's work has been recognized in independent Ukraine for its scientific importance and impact on medical knowledge.

== Early life and career ==
Radzymovska was born in 1886 in a small estate near Lubny in the Poltava region, in the family of Ukrainian nobleman Vasyl Yanovskyi. Her mother was Lyubov Yanovska, a writer, public figure, and future member of the Central Rada. While studying at the Lubensk Women's Oleksandrivsk Gymnasium, Radzymovska joined the circle of the Revolutionary Ukrainian Party.

She studied in Kyiv Higher Women Medical Courses, as women were not allowed to study in the university those days. Still, she was prohibited from studying medicine as she took part in illegal political activity supporting Ukrainian national renaissance. So in 1904, she should leave for Kyiv where she actually was graduated from the university in 1913. Radzymovska joined physiological chemistry chair staff under Oleksii Sadoven.

In 1924, she defended her doctoral thesis and became professor of biochemistry and physiology in Medical Institute and People's Educational Institute in Kyiv.

Later in 1930 she was arrested by Soviet State Political Directorate on political accusations in Union for the Freedom of Ukraine trial. Later, she was released from custody, but still fired from her research positions. Radzymovska recovered some of them in mid 1930s. In 1939-1941 she was physiology professor in Melitopol Educational Institute.

In 1941, she stayed in Ukraine during German invasion and occupation. She holds positions in Kyiv Clinical Medicine Institute and Chair in Lviv University. In 1943, she left to Germany and in 1950 to the United States.

After graduating from the gymnasium, Radzymovska continued her education at the science courses of Lohvytska-Skalon in St. Petersburg. While there, she participated in the St. Petersburg Ukrainian community together with Dmytro Doroshenko, Valentyn Sadovskyi, Pavlo Krat, and others.

However, it is believed that Radzymovska's studies in St. Petersburg were cut short due to her "excessive social activity" and her becoming pregnant with her lover, history teacher Ivan Radzymovskyi, whom she married in Kyiv.

== Contributions ==
Radzymovska's research developed in three main directions: the influence of acid-alkaline balance on the function of living cells, pathological physiology of tuberculosis, and children's physiology. Her doctoral dissertation focused on the survival of cells outside the body under conditions of varying amounts of acid in the nutrient medium. The knowledge gained from this work has been crucial for clinics that perform artificial insemination and laboratories that study the development of viruses.

In 1921, during a period of famine, Radzymovska developed a special device, an electrode, which was used to measure the acidity of animal cells isolated from the body. She performed more than 50 series of experiments, using a total of more than 1,200 dishes of cultured rabbit cells. Based on the results of this work, not only was a dissertation published, but scientific articles in leading international journals, including German and British.

Radzymovska's research also focused on tuberculosis, a deadly disease that was highly prevalent at the beginning of the 20th century. She not only studied the tissue changes caused by tuberculosis but also looked for ways to rehabilitate from this disease, which were limited in those days when antibiotics were almost unknown. Radzymovska became interested in the physiology of childhood early in her career. While working at the Froebel Institute, she investigated the impact of social upheavals on children's health in general.

In 1923, Radzymovska's work "Children of the Revolution" about the impact of malnutrition on the development of children was published. During 1922, the second year of the famine caused by terrorism when bread was taken from the peasants, she and two colleagues examined 6,845 children, conducting more than 27,000 anthropometric measurements. The conclusions of the monograph sounded the alarm: "On the basis of all the above, it is clear that children during the revolution entered the stage of detention and disruption of normal development. ... The task of educators, teachers, doctors is to quickly navigate the consequences of severe trauma and help the young organism because it perhaps to return what he lost..."

== Legacy and recognition ==
Despite her significant contributions to science, Radzymovska's name was erased from Soviet history books, and her scientific institutions nearly forgot her contribution. Only during independent Ukraine, isolated intelligences began to return her name to the context of the history of medicine and the history of Kyiv University. Radzymovska's legacy was further eroded during the Soviet era, where her work was downplayed and not recognized as a valuable contribution to the field of science.

== Death ==
She died in Illinois on December 22, 1953.

== Family ==
Her children were Olha and Yevhen Radzymovskyi. Yevhen was researcher in engineering (1905-1975), professor in University of Illinois at Urbana-Champaign since 1959.

== Notable works ==
- Krontovski, A. A.; Radzymovska, V. V. (1922). "On the influence of changes of concentration of the H• resp. OH′ ions on the life of the tissue cells of vertebrates". The Journal of Physiology. 56 (5): 275–282. doi:10.1113/jphysiol.1922.sp002010. ISSN 0022-3751. PMC 1405378. PMID 16993529.
- Radzimowska, W. W.; Jazimirska, M. C. (1925). "Über die Bestimmung der Wasserstoffionen-Konzentration in Einzelnen Bakterienkolonien". Klinische Wochenschrift. 4 (2): 72–73. doi:10.1007/BF01748138. ISSN 0023-2173. S2CID 29888050.

== Sources ==
- Ivan Rozhin. Valentyna Radzymovska: SHORT SKETCH OF HER LIFE, HER SCIENTIFIC AND PUBLIC ACTIVITY.; Published by the Ukrainian Free Academy of Sciences — Winnipeg, 1968. — 48 p.
- Bastian, H., says:, M. E. Z., says:, H. B., & says:, J. V. K. (2022, November 7). Early ukrainian women scientists: Part 1 – from fossils to the planets and back. Absolutely Maybe. Retrieved April 11, 2023, from https://absolutelymaybe.plos.org/2022/04/27/early-ukrainian-women-scientists-part-1-from-fossils-to-the-planets-and-back/
- Boldyriev, O. (n.d.). ПОЛІТИЧНЕ ТА ОСОБИСТЕ В КИЇВСЬКОМУ НАУКОВОМУ ЖИТТІ ВАЛЕНТИНИ РАДЗИМОВСЬКОЇ. City: History, Culture, Society. Retrieved April 11, 2023, from http://mics.org.ua/journal/index.php/mics/article/view/218
- from WiE-UC March Newsletterby sbucieee. (2022, March 13). Biography ofbiography of Valentynavalentyna Radzymovska - p. 2Radzymovska. issuu. Retrieved April 11, 2023, from https://issuu.com/sbucieee/docs/newsletter_22/s/15100141
- Ukrainian women and girls in science - official website of Ukraine. (n.d.). Retrieved April 12, 2023, from https://ukraine.ua/stories/ukrainian-women-in-science/
