= Afromylea =

Scientific classification
- Kingdom: Animalia
- Phylum: Arthropoda
- Clade: Pancrustacea
- Class: Insecta
- Order: Lepidoptera
- Family: Pyralidae
- Subfamily: Phycitinae
- Genus: Afromylea; Balinsky, 1994
- Species: A. natalica

Binomial name
- Afromylea natalica Balinsky, 1994

Genus of moths

Afromylea is a genus of snout moths. It contains the species Afromylea natalica. It is found in South Africa.
