= Flabellobasis =

Scientific classification
- Kingdom: Animalia
- Phylum: Arthropoda
- Class: Insecta
- Order: Lepidoptera
- Family: Pyralidae
- Subfamily: Phycitinae
- Genus: Flabellobasis; Balinsky, 1991

Genus of moths

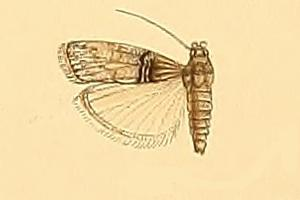
Illustration of Flabellobasis capensis

Flabellobasis is a genus of snout moths. It was described by Boris Balinsky in 1991 and is known from South Africa.

== Species ==
- Flabellobasis capensis (Hampson, 1901)
- Flabellobasis montana Balinsky, 1991
