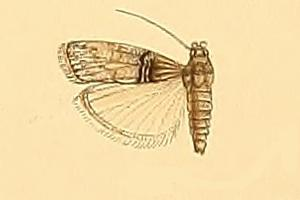

Scientific classification
- Kingdom: Animalia
- Phylum: Arthropoda
- Class: Insecta
- Order: Lepidoptera
- Family: Pyralidae
- Genus: Flabellobasis
- Species: F. capensis

Binomial name
- Flabellobasis capensis (Hampson, 1901)

Synonyms
- Trachonitis capensis Hampson, 1901; Candiopella reunionalis Guillermet, 2007

= Flabellobasis capensis =

Species of moth

Flabellobasis capensis is a species of snout moth in the genus Flabellobasis. It is found in South Africa, Ghana, Kenya, Namibia, Réunion and Zimbabwe but has also been recorded from Spain.

The wingspan is about 24 mm.
