= List of Pyralidae genera =

This is a full list of Pyralidae genera.

- Abachausia
- Abaera
- Abareia
- Acallidia
- Acallis
- Accinctapubes
- Achroia
- Acolastodes
- Acracona
- Acritonia
- Acrobasis
- Acrobasopsis
- Acroncosa
- Actenia
- Acteniopsis
- Actinocrates
- Actrix
- Acyperas
- Adanarsa
- Addyme
- Adelosemia
- Adelperga
- Adelphia
- Adenopteryx
- Adulis
- Afra
- Africella
- Afromyelois
- Afromylea
- Afropsipyla
- Agastophanes
- Aglossa
- Aglossodes
- Ahyalosticta
- Alispoides
- Alophia
- Alphacrambus
- Alpheias
- Alpheioides
- Ambesa
- Ambetilia
- Ambluncus
- Amechedia
- Amegarthria
- Ammatucha
- Amphiderita
- Amphignostis
- Amphithrix
- Amyelois
- Anacostia
- Anactenia
- Anadelosemia
- Anaeglis
- Anarnatula
- Anassodes
- Anchylobela
- Ancova
- Ancylodes
- Ancylodinia
- Ancylosis
- Ancylosoma
- Anderida
- Anegcephalesis
- Anemmalocera
- Anemosa
- Anemosella
- Anephopteryx
- Anerastia
- Anerosoma
- Anexophana
- Anisothrix
- Anjumania
- Anobostra
- Anonaepestis
- Anoristia
- Anthopteryx
- Antiptilotis
- Antisindris
- Anypsipyla
- Aphomia
- Aphycita
- Aphyletes
- Apocera
- Apodentinodia
- Apomyelois
- Aprophthasia
- Aptunga
- Araeopaschia
- Arbinia
- Archiephestia
- Archigalleria
- Arctioblepsis
- Ardekania
- Ardekanopsis
- Ardjuna
- Area
- Arenipses
- Arescoptera
- Arica
- Arimania
- Arispe
- Arivaca
- Arouva
- Arsenaria
- Arsissa
- Arta
- Asalebria
- Asaluria
- Asarta
- Asartodes
- Asclerobia
- Asemeia
- Aspithroides
- Assara
- Astrapometis
- Atascosa
- Athaliptis
- Atheloca
- Atopothoures
- Auchmera
- Audeoudia
- Aurana
- Australephestiodes
- Austropaschia
- Autocyrota
- Auxacia
- Azaera
- Azamora
- Azanicola
- Bahiria
- Balanomis
- Balidarcha
- Bandera
- Bapara
- Baptotropa
- Barberia
- Barbifrontia
- Basacallis
- Bazaria
- Belutschistania
- Bema
- Benderia
- Berastagia
- Bertelia
- Bethulia
- Betsimisaraka
- Bibasilaris
- Birinus
- Bisinusia
- Blepharocerus
- Boeswarthia
- Bonchis
- Borosia
- Bostra
- Brachiolodes
- Bradypodicola
- Bradypophila
- Bradyrrhoa
- Burgeonidea
- Cabnia
- Cabotella
- Cacotherapia
- Cacozelia
- Cacozophera
- Cactoblastis
- Cadra
- Cahela
- Caina
- Calamotropa
- Calamotropodes
- Calguia
- Callasopia
- Callionyma
- Calybitia
- Candiopella
- Canthelea
- Cantheleamima
- Caphys
- Cappsia
- Caradjaria
- Carcha
- Cardamyla
- Caristanius
- Carthade
- Carthara
- Cassiana
- Casuaria
- Cataclysta
- Catadupa
- Catalaodes
- Catamola
- Cataprosopus
- Catastia
- Cathayia
- Cathyalia
- Catocrocis
- Catopyla
- Caudellia
- Caustella
- Caviana
- Cavipalpia
- Cayennia
- Cecidipta
- Centrometopia
- Ceracanthia
- Ceratagra
- Ceratothalama
- Ceroprepes
- Ceuthelea
- Ceutholopha
- Chararica
- Cherchera
- Chevalierella
- Chilocremastis
- Chloropaschia
- Chorrera
- Chortonoeca
- Christophia
- Chrysauge
- Chrysophila
- Chrysoscinia
- Ciliocera
- Ciliocerodes
- Ciliopempelia
- Citripestis
- Clydonopteron
- Cnephidia
- Coenochroa
- Coenodomus
- Coenotropa
- Coleocornutia
- Coleothrix
- Commotria
- Comotia
- Condylolomia
- Conobathra
- Copamyntis
- Coptarthria
- Corcyra
- Cosmethella
- Craftsia
- Cremnophila
- Creobota
- Cristia
- Crocalia
- Crocidomera
- Crocydopora
- Cromarcha
- Cryptadia
- Cryptarthria
- Cryptoblabes
- Cryptomyelois
- Cryptophycita
- Cryptoses
- Cryptozophera
- Crystallozyga
- Ctenarthria
- Ctenomedes
- Ctenomeristis
- Culcitaria
- Cuniberta
- Cunibertoides
- Curena
- Cyclidalis
- Cyclopalpia
- Cyiza
- Cyphita
- Cyprusia
- Dalakia
- Daria
- Dastira
- Dasycnemia
- Dasypyga
- Dasyvesica
- Dattinia
- Davara
- Dectocera
- Delcina
- Delogenes
- Delopterus
- Dembea
- Dentitegumia
- Deopteryx
- Derbeta
- Deuterollyta
- Dialepta
- Diatomocera
- Didia
- Difundella
- Diloxia
- Diloxis
- Dinopleura
- Dioryctria
- Dipha
- Dipsochares
- Discofrontia
- Discordia
- Distortia
- Ditrachyptera
- Diviana
- Divitiaca
- Dolichomia
- Doloessa
- Dracaenura aegialitis
- Drepanodia
- Drescoma
- Drescomopsis
- Dysphylia
- Ecbatania
- Ecbletodes
- Eccopidia
- Eccopisa
- Ecnomoneura
- Ectohomoeosoma
- Edulica
- Elaealis
- Elasmopalpus
- Eldana
- Elegia
- Elisabethinia
- Ematheudes
- Embryoglossa
- Emmalocera
- Emporia
- Endolasia
- Endosimilis
- Endotricha
- Enosima
- Entmemacornis
- Epacternis
- Ephedrophila
- Ephestia
- Ephestiodes
- Ephestiopsis
- Epichalcia
- Epicrocis
- Epidauria
- Epidelia
- Epiepischnia
- Epilepia
- Epimorius
- Epiparachma
- Epiparthia
- Epipaschia
- Epischidia
- Epischnia
- Epischnopsis
- Episcythrastis
- Epitamyra
- Epizonora
- Ereboenis
- Erelieva
- Ernophthora
- Ertzica
- Essina
- Ethelontides
- Ethiopsella
- Ethopia
- Etiella
- Etielloides
- Euageta
- Eublemmodes
- Eucampyla
- Eucarphia
- Eugyroptera
- Eulogia
- Eulophopalpia
- Eulophota
- Eumysia
- Eupilocera
- Eurhodope
- Eurhophaea
- Eurythmasis
- Eurythmia
- Eurythmidia
- Euryzonella
- Euzophera
- Euzopherodes
- Exodesis
- Exuperius
- Farnobia
- Farsia
- Fissicera
- Flabellobasis
- Fondoukia
- Fossifrontia
- Fregenia
- Fulrada
- Fundella
- Gabinius
- Galasa
- Galasodes
- Galleria
- Gallerites
- Gauna
- Gennadius
- Genopaschia
- Genophantis
- Gephyra
- Gephyrella
- Geropaschia
- Getulia
- Glendotricha
- Glossopaschia
- Glyphocystis
- Glyptocera
- Glyptoteles
- Gnathomorpha
- Gorama
- Goya
- Gozmanyia
- Grammiphlebia
- Gregorempista
- Guastica
- Gunungia
- Gunungodes
- Gymnancyla
- Gymnancylodes
- Hafisia
- Hannemanneia
- Hanreisseria
- Haplosindris
- Harnochina
- Harraria
- Hednotodes
- Heinrichiessa
- Heminomistis
- Hemiptilocera
- Hemiptiloceroides
- Heras
- Herculia
- Hercynodes
- Heterauge
- Heterochrosis
- Heterocrasa
- Heteromicta
- Hobohmia
- Hoeneodes
- Holoperas
- Homodigma
- Homoeographa
- Homoeosoma
- Homosassa
- Homura
- Honora
- Honorinus
- Horistarcha
- Hosidia
- Humiphila
- Hyalosticta
- Hyboloma
- Hydaspia
- Hylopercnas
- Hylopylora
- Hypanchyla
- Hypargyria
- Hyperparachma
- Hypochalcia
- Hypocosmia
- Hypodaria
- Hypolophota
- Hyporatasa
- Hypotia
- Hypsipyla
- Hypsopygia
- Hypsotropa
- Idiobrotis
- Idnea
- Idneodes
- Ilithyia
- Illatila
- Imerina
- Immyrla
- Incarcha
- Indocabnia
- Indomalayia
- Indomyrlaea
- Insalebria
- Interjectio
- Irakia
- Iraniodes
- Isolopha
- Itambe
- Jacutscia
- Jakuarte
- Jocara
- Kasyapa
- Katja
- Kaurava
- Keradere
- Khachia
- Khorassania
- Khuzistania
- Kivia
- Klimeschiola
- Kumbhakarna
- Lacalma
- Laciempista
- Lacipea
- Laetilia
- Lamacha
- Lambaesia
- Lameerea
- Lamida
- Lamoria
- Larice
- Laristania
- Larodryas
- Lascelina
- Lasiosticha
- Latagognoma
- Laurentia
- Leotropa
- Lepidogma
- Lepidomys
- Lepipaschia
- Leptoses
- Letoa
- Leviantenna
- Lioprosopa
- Lipographis
- Lista
- Locastra
- Lophocera
- Lophopleura
- Lophopleuropsis
- Lophothoracia
- Loryma
- Lorymana
- Lorymodes
- Lymphia
- Macalla
- Macna
- Macrophycis
- Macropyralis
- Macrorrhinia
- Macrovalva
- Madiama
- Magiria
- Magiriamorpha
- Magiriopsis
- Makrania
- Malgachinsula
- Maliarpha
- Mampava
- Mapeta
- Maricopa
- Marionana
- Marionodes
- Marisba
- Martia
- Martiniodes
- Mascelia
- Maschalandra
- Masthala
- Mayaciella
- Mazdacis
- Meca
- Mecistophylla
- Medaniaria
- Mediavia
- Mediophycis
- Megacaphys
- Megacerdresa
- Megalophota
- Megalophycita
- Megarthria
- Megarthridia
- Megasis
- Melanalis
- Melanastia
- Melathrix
- Menuthia
- Merangiria
- Meroptera
- Merulempista
- Mescinia
- Mesciniadia
- Mesciniodes
- Mesodiphlebia
- Mesosindris
- Metacrateria
- Metallosticha
- Metallostichodes
- Metaraphia
- Metephestia
- Metoecis
- Metriostola
- Meyriccia
- Meyrickiella
- Michaeliodes
- Michaelshaffera
- Microchlora
- Micromastra
- Micromescinia
- Micromystix
- Micronix
- Micropaschia
- Microphestia
- Microphycita
- Microrca
- Microsauge
- Microzancla
- Mildrixia
- Milgithea
- Miliberta
- Mimetauge
- Mimicia
- Mimopolyocha
- Minooa
- Mittonia
- Moerbes
- Monoctenocera
- Monoloxis
- Monoptilota
- Monotonia
- Moodna
- Moodnodes
- Moodnopsis
- Murgisca
- Mussidia
- Myelodes
- Myelois
- Myeloisiphana
- Myelopsis
- Myelopsoides
- Myolisa
- Myrlaea
- Nachaba
- Nakurubia
- Namibicola
- Namibiopsis
- Navasota
- Navura
- Nefundella
- Negalasa
- Neobostra
- Neocaphys
- Neocoristis
- Neodavisia
- Neoepimorius
- Neopaschia
- Neopempelia
- Neophrida
- Neorastia
- Neorufalda
- Neostriglina
- Nephopterix
- Nephopterygia
- Nevacolima
- Nhoabe
- Nicetiodes
- Niethammeriodes
- Noctuides
- Nonambesa
- Nonia
- Nonphycita
- Nyctegretis
- Nylonala
- Obutobea
- Ocala
- Ocoba
- Ocrasa
- Ocresia
- Ocrisiodes
- Ocydina
- Odontarthria
- Odontopaschia
- Oectoperodes
- Oedilepia
- Oedothmia
- Oenogenes
- Ogilvia
- Oligochroa
- Oligochroides
- Olybria
- Omphalepia
- Omphalobasella
- Omphalocera
- Omphalomia
- Omphalota
- Oncocera
- Oncolabis
- Oneida
- Ophias
- Oreana
- Ormuzdia
- Orthaga
- Ortholepis
- Orthopygia
- Orybina
- Oryctocera
- Oryctometopia
- Oryctopleura
- Osakia
- Oxyalcia
- Oxybia
- Oxydisia
- Pachypodistes
- Paconius
- Palloria
- Palmia
- Palmitia
- Palpusopsis
- Pandoflabella
- Parabaera
- Parachma
- Parachmidia
- Paractenia
- Paraemporia
- Paragalasa
- Paraglossa
- Paralaodamia
- Paralipsa
- Paramacna
- Paramaxillaria
- Paranatula
- Paraphomia
- Paraphycita
- Pararotruda
- Parasclerobia
- Parasefidia
- Parastericta
- Paratascosa
- Parazanclodes
- Paridnea
- Paroxyptera
- Parramatta
- Parthia
- Passadena
- Passelgis
- Patagoniodes
- Patna
- Patriciola
- Peadus
- Pelasgis
- Pempelia
- Penetiana
- Peniculimius
- Penthesilea
- Peoria
- Peplochora
- Perinetoides
- Perisseretma
- Persicoptera
- Perula
- Phestinia
- Phidotricha
- Philodema
- Philosauritis
- Philotis
- Phobus
- Phycita
- Phycitodes
- Phycitophila
- Phycitopsis
- Phylebria
- Picrogama
- Piesmopoda
- Pima
- Pimodes
- Pionidia
- Pirizania
- Pirizanodes
- Pithyllis
- Plagoa
- Platycrates
- Pleurochila
- Plodia
- Plumiphora
- Plutopaschia
- Pococera
- Pocopaschia
- Pogononeura
- Pogonotropha
- Pogrima
- Poliopaschia
- Poliostola
- Polopeustis
- Polycampsis
- Polylophota
- Polyocha
- Postemmalocera
- Potosa
- Praecomotia
- Praedonula
- Praeepischnia
- Praekatja
- Praerhinaphe
- Praesaluria
- Prasinoxena
- Pretoria
- Pristarthria
- Pristocerella
- Proancylosis
- Procunea
- Promylea
- Prophtasia
- Prorophora
- Proropoca
- Prosaris
- Prosoeuzophera
- Prosthenia
- Protasia
- Proteinia
- Protoetiella
- Protomoerbes
- Protrichia
- Psectrodes
- Pseudacrobasis
- Pseudarenipses
- Pseudasopia
- Pseudocabima
- Pseudocabotia
- Pseudocadra
- Pseudoceroprepes
- Pseudodavara
- Pseudodivona
- Pseudogetulia
- Pseudographis
- Pseudomegasis
- Pseudophycita
- Pseudopiesmopoda
- Psoropristia
- Psorosa
- Psorosana
- Psorosina
- Psorosodes
- Psorozophera
- Pterothrixidia
- Ptyobathra
- Ptyomaxia
- Ptyonocera
- Pyla
- Pylamorpha
- Pyralestes
- Pyralis
- Pyralites
- Pyralosis
- Pyrauge
- Pyraustodes
- Quadraforma
- Quadrischistis
- Quasiexuperius
- Quasipuer
- Quasisalebria
- Quasisarata
- Rabiria
- Ragonotia
- Rambutaneia
- Ramosignathos
- Ramphidium
- Rampylla
- Raphimetopus
- Ratasa
- Repetekiodes
- Replicia
- Restidia
- Reynosa
- Rhagea
- Rhectophlebia
- Rhinaphe
- Rhinaphena
- Rhinogradentia
- Rhodochrysa
- Rhodophaea
- Rhynchephestia
- Rhynchetera
- Rhynchopaschia
- Rhynchopselaphus
- Rhynchopygia
- Rhynchotosale
- Ribua
- Rioja
- Roeseliodes
- Rostripalpus
- Rostrolaetilia
- Rotrudosoma
- Rucuma
- Rufalda
- Rumatha
- Saborma
- Sabormania
- Sacada
- Sacculocornutia
- Salebria
- Salebriacus
- Salebriaria
- Salebriodes
- Salebriopsis
- Salinaria
- Salobrena
- Saluria
- Samaria
- Samcova
- Sandrabatis
- Sanguesa
- Sarasota
- Sarcistis
- Sardzea
- Satole
- Scenedra
- Scenidiopis
- Schistoneura
- Schistotheca
- Schoutedenidea
- Sciota
- Sclerobia
- Sclerobiodes
- Scorylus
- Scythrophanes
- Seeboldia
- Sefidia
- Selagia
- Selagiaforma
- Selga
- Sematoneura
- Semnia
- Sempronia
- Sengania
- Serrulacera
- Setomigma
- Shafferiessa
- Shebania
- Shirazia
- Siboga
- Sindris
- Sineudonia
- Singhalia
- Sosipatra
- Sparactica
- Spatulipalpia
- Spectrobates
- Spectrotrota
- Speiroceras
- Sphinctocera
- Sporophyla
- Spurilaetilia
- Stanempista
- Statia
- Staudingeria
- Stemmatophora
- Stenachroia
- Steneromene
- Stenopaschia
- Stereobela
- Stericta
- Sthenobaea
- Stomoclista
- Strephomescinia
- Streptopalpia
- Stylobasis
- Stylopalpia
- Styphlorachis
- Succadana
- Sudania
- Sudaniola
- Sultania
- Sybrida
- Symphonistis
- Synaphe
- Synoria
- Syntypica
- Taboga
- Tacoma
- Taftania
- Taiwanastrapometis
- Tallula
- Tampa
- Tamraca
- Tamyra
- Tancoa
- Tanyethira
- Taprobania
- Tarquitia
- Tegulifera
- Teleochytis
- Telethusia
- Teliphasa
- Tenellopsis
- Tephris
- Termioptycha
- Tetraschistis
- Thalamorrhyncha
- Tharsanthes
- Thermopteryx
- Thermotesia
- Thiallela
- Thopeutis
- Thospia
- Thylacoptila
- Thyridopyralis
- Tineopaschia
- Tinerastia
- Tinestra
- Tippecoa
- Tirathaba
- Titanoceros
- Tlascala
- Toccolosida
- Toripalpus
- Tornocometis
- Torotambe
- Tosale
- Tota
- Trachonitis
- Trachycera
- Trachylepidia
- Trachypteryx
- Transcaspia
- Trebania
- Tretopteryx
- Triaenoneura
- Trichotophysa
- Triozosneura
- Triphassa
- Trisides
- Trissonca
- Trychnocrana
- Tsaraphycis
- Tsaratanana
- Tulsa
- Tylochares
- Tyndis
- Ufa
- Uliosoma
- Ulophora
- Ulotricha
- Unadilla
- Unadillides
- Uncinus
- Ungulopsis
- Urbania
- Vagobanta
- Valdovecaria
- Valva
- Varneria
- Veldticola
- Verina
- Vezina
- Vietteia
- Villiersoides
- Vinicia
- Vitessa
- Vitessidia
- Vitula
- Vixsinusia
- Voglia
- Volatica
- Volobilis
- Wakulla
- Welderella
- Wunderia
- Xantippe
- Xantippides
- Xenomilia
- Xenophasma
- Yxygodes
- Zaboba
- Zamagiria
- Zamanna
- Zanclodes
- Zapalla
- Zitha
- Zonora
- Zonula
- Zophodia
- Zophodiodes
- Zynodes
