= Farsia (disambiguation) =

Farsia is a small settlement in northeastern Western Sahara.

Farsia may also refer to:

- Farsia (moth), a genus of insects in the family Pyralidae
- Wolfartius, or Farsia, a trilobite genus
