= Venosa (disambiguation) =

Venosa is a town and comune in Italy.

Venosa may also refer to:

== People ==
- Carlo Gesualdo, also known as Gesualdo da Venosa, Italian nobleman and composer
- Robert Venosa, American artist

== Plants ==
- Arnica venosa, an herb commonly known as Shasta County arnica, endemic to California
- Brassavola venosa, a species of orchid
- Chione venosa, a species of flowering plant in the family Rubiaceae
- Disciotis venosa, a fungus in the family Morchellaceae, commonly known as the veiny cup fungus or cup morel
- Diospyros venosa, a tree in the family Ebenaceae
- Dracula venosa, a species of orchid
- Haworthiopsis venosa, a species of succulent flowering plant in the family Asphodelaceae
- Lipochaeta venosa, a species of aster, also known as spreading nehe
- Lysimachia venosa, a plant in the family Myrsinaceae commonly known as veined yellow loosestrife
- Macaranga venosa, a species of plant in the family Euphorbiaceae endemic to French Polynesia
- Notelaea venosa, a plant of Australia commonly known as veined mock-olive, smooth mock-olive, large-leaved mock-olive and large mock-olive
- Onobrychis venosa, an herb in the family Fabaceae, also known as veined sainfoin
- Senegalia venosa, a legume in the family Fabaceae
- Vangueria venosa, a species of flowering plant in the family Rubiaceae
- Virola venosa, a tree in the family Myristicaceae

== Animals ==
- Abantis venosa, a butterfly in the family Hesperiidae, also known as the veined skipper or veined paradise skipper
- Aedophron venosa, a moth in the family Noctuidae
- Agylla venosa, a moth in the family Erebidae
- Cacozophera venosa, a species of snout moth
- Carnarvonia venosa, a fossilised arthropod
- Colotis venosa, a butterfly in the family Pieridae, commonly known as the no patch tip
- Ctenucha venosa, a moth in the family Erebidae, also known as the veined ctenucha moth
- Eudonia venosa, a moth in the family Crambidae endemic to Hawaii
- Lemyra venosa, a moth in the family Erebidae
- Polyocha venosa, a species of snout moth
- Prabhasa venosa, a moth in the family Erebidae
- Rapana venosa, a sea snail, commonly known as the veined rapa whelk or Asian rapa whelk
- Tachina venosa, a species of fly in the family Tachinidae

== Other ==
- Venosa Airfield, a unit of the World War II Foggia Airfield Complex in Italy
