= L. amseli =

L. amseli may refer to:

- Laciempista amseli, a snout moth
- Loxomorpha amseli, a grass moth
