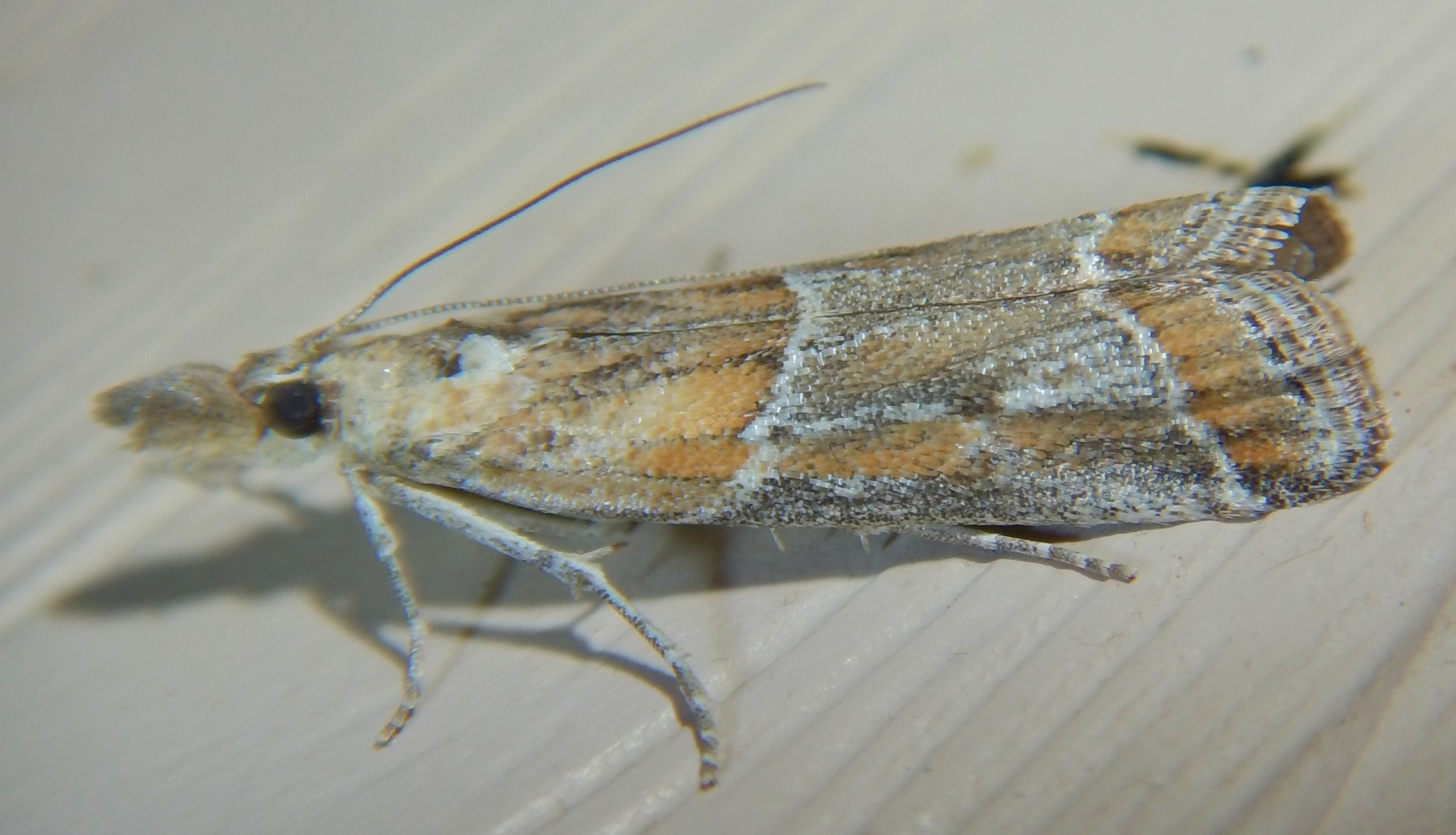

Scientific classification
- Kingdom: Animalia
- Phylum: Arthropoda
- Clade: Pancrustacea
- Class: Insecta
- Order: Lepidoptera
- Family: Pyralidae
- Genus: Lipographis
- Species: L. fenestrella

Binomial name
- Lipographis fenestrella (Packard, 1873)

Synonyms
- List: Pempelia fenestrella Packard, 1873; Lipographis humilis Ragonot, 1887; Pempelia leoninella Packard, 1873; Lipographis leoninella; Pyla pallidella Dyar, 1904

= Lipographis fenestrella =

Species of moth

Lipographis fenestrella is a species of snout moth that was first described by Packard in 1873. It is known from Baja California, California, Nevada and Utah.
