= Nefundella xalapensis =

Scientific classification
- Kingdom: Animalia
- Phylum: Arthropoda
- Class: Insecta
- Order: Lepidoptera
- Family: Pyralidae
- Genus: Nefundella
- Species: N. xalapensis

Binomial name
- Nefundella xalapensis Neunzig, 1986

Species of snout moth in the family Pyralidae from Mexico

Nefundella xalapensis is a species of snout moth in the genus Nefundella. It is found in Mexico.
