= Azaera nodoses =

Scientific classification
- Kingdom: Animalia
- Phylum: Arthropoda
- Clade: Pancrustacea
- Class: Insecta
- Order: Lepidoptera
- Family: Pyralidae
- Genus: Azaera
- Species: A. nodoses

Binomial name
- Azaera nodoses (Dyar, 1914)

Synonyms
- Calamophleps nodoses Dyar, 1914

Species of moth

Azaera nodoses is a species of snout moth in the genus Azaera. It was described by Harrison Gray Dyar Jr. in 1914, and is known from Panama.
