= Drescoma cinilixa =

Scientific classification
- Domain: Eukaryota
- Kingdom: Animalia
- Phylum: Arthropoda
- Class: Insecta
- Order: Lepidoptera
- Family: Pyralidae
- Genus: Drescoma
- Species: D. cinilixa

Binomial name
- Drescoma cinilixa Dyar, 1914

Species of moth

Drescoma cinilixa is a species of snout moth in the genus Drescoma. It was described by Harrison Gray Dyar Jr. in 1914 and is known from Panama, Costa Rica and Guatemala.
