= Odontarthria ochrivenella =

Scientific classification
- Domain: Eukaryota
- Kingdom: Animalia
- Phylum: Arthropoda
- Class: Insecta
- Order: Lepidoptera
- Family: Pyralidae
- Genus: Odontarthria
- Species: O. ochrivenella

Binomial name
- Odontarthria ochrivenella Ragonot, 1893

Species of moth

Odontarthria ochrivenella is a species of snout moth in the genus Odontarthria. It was described by Ragonot in 1893, and is known from Brazil.
