= Ocrisiodes bamella =

Scientific classification
- Domain: Eukaryota
- Kingdom: Animalia
- Phylum: Arthropoda
- Class: Insecta
- Order: Lepidoptera
- Family: Pyralidae
- Genus: Ocrisiodes
- Species: O. bamella

Binomial name
- Ocrisiodes bamella (Amsel, 1958)

Synonyms
- Uncinomorpha bamella Amsel, 1958

Species of moth

Ocrisiodes bamella is a species of snout moth in the genus Ocrisiodes. It was described by Hans Georg Amsel in 1958 and is known from Iran.
