= Nevacolima jaliscoensis =

Scientific classification
- Kingdom: Animalia
- Phylum: Arthropoda
- Class: Insecta
- Order: Lepidoptera
- Family: Pyralidae
- Genus: Nevacolima
- Species: N. jaliscoensis

Binomial name
- Nevacolima jaliscoensis Neunzig, 1994

Species of moth

Nevacolima jaliscoensis is a species of snout moth in the genus Nevacolima. It is found in west-central Mexico.

The length of the forewings is 6.5–8.5 mm (0.26–0.33 in).
