= Ocrisiodes babaella =

Scientific classification
- Domain: Eukaryota
- Kingdom: Animalia
- Phylum: Arthropoda
- Class: Insecta
- Order: Lepidoptera
- Family: Pyralidae
- Genus: Ocrisiodes
- Species: O. babaella

Binomial name
- Ocrisiodes babaella (Amsel, 1970)

Synonyms
- Gnathomorpha babaella Amsel, 1970

Species of moth

Ocrisiodes babaella is a species of snout moth in the genus Ocrisiodes. It was described by Hans Georg Amsel in 1970 and is found in Afghanistan.
