= Nefundella distractor =

Scientific classification
- Kingdom: Animalia
- Phylum: Arthropoda
- Class: Insecta
- Order: Lepidoptera
- Family: Pyralidae
- Genus: Nefundella
- Species: N. distractor

Binomial name
- Nefundella distractor Heinrich, 1956

Species of moth

Nefundella distractor is a species of snout moth in the genus Nefundella. It is found in Puerto Rico.
