= Diatomocera decurrens =

Scientific classification
- Kingdom: Animalia
- Phylum: Arthropoda
- Clade: Pancrustacea
- Class: Insecta
- Order: Lepidoptera
- Family: Pyralidae
- Genus: Diatomocera
- Species: D. decurrens

Binomial name
- Diatomocera decurrens (Dyar, 1914)

Synonyms
- Cabima decurrens Dyar, 1914

Species of moth

Diatomocera decurrens is a species of snout moth in the genus Diatomocera. It was described by Harrison Gray Dyar Jr., in 1914, and is known from Panama.
