= Diatomocera tenebricosa =

Scientific classification
- Domain: Eukaryota
- Kingdom: Animalia
- Phylum: Arthropoda
- Class: Insecta
- Order: Lepidoptera
- Family: Pyralidae
- Genus: Diatomocera
- Species: D. tenebricosa

Binomial name
- Diatomocera tenebricosa (Zeller, 1881)

Synonyms
- Homoeosoma tenebricosa Zeller, 1881

Species of moth

Diatomocera tenebricosa is a species of snout moth in the genus Diatomocera. It was described by Zeller in 1881. It is found in Colombia.
