= Ocrisiodes senganella =

Scientific classification
- Domain: Eukaryota
- Kingdom: Animalia
- Phylum: Arthropoda
- Class: Insecta
- Order: Lepidoptera
- Family: Pyralidae
- Genus: Ocrisiodes
- Species: O. senganella

Binomial name
- Ocrisiodes senganella (Amsel, 1961)

Synonyms
- Gnathomorpha senganella Amsel, 1961; Gnathomorpha arghandabella Amsel, 1970

Species of moth

Ocrisiodes senganella is a species of snout moth in the genus Ocrisiodes. It was described by Hans Georg Amsel in 1961 and is known from Iran and Afghanistan.
