= Ocrisiodes turkmeniensis =

Scientific classification
- Domain: Eukaryota
- Kingdom: Animalia
- Phylum: Arthropoda
- Class: Insecta
- Order: Lepidoptera
- Family: Pyralidae
- Genus: Ocrisiodes
- Species: O. turkmeniensis

Binomial name
- Ocrisiodes turkmeniensis Asselbergs, 2004

Species of moth

Ocrisiodes turkmeniensis is a species of snout moth in the genus Ocrisiodes. It was described by Jan Asselbergs in 2004 and is known from Turkmenistan.
