= Ocrisiodes occulta =

Scientific classification
- Domain: Eukaryota
- Kingdom: Animalia
- Phylum: Arthropoda
- Class: Insecta
- Order: Lepidoptera
- Family: Pyralidae
- Genus: Ocrisiodes
- Species: O. occulta

Binomial name
- Ocrisiodes occulta Roesler, 1990

Species of moth

Ocrisiodes occulta is a species of snout moth in the genus Ocrisiodes. It was described by Roesler in 1990, and is known from Iran.
