= Ocrisiodes polyptychella =

Scientific classification
- Domain: Eukaryota
- Kingdom: Animalia
- Phylum: Arthropoda
- Class: Insecta
- Order: Lepidoptera
- Family: Pyralidae
- Genus: Ocrisiodes
- Species: O. polyptychella

Binomial name
- Ocrisiodes polyptychella Ragonot, 1887

Synonyms
- Mechedia pristophorella Amsel, 1951

Species of moth

Ocrisiodes polyptychella is a species of snout moth in the genus Ocrisiodes. It was described by Ragonot in 1887, and is known from Iran.
