= Dasycnemia depressalis =

Scientific classification
- Domain: Eukaryota
- Kingdom: Animalia
- Phylum: Arthropoda
- Class: Insecta
- Order: Lepidoptera
- Family: Pyralidae
- Genus: Dasycnemia
- Species: D. depressalis

Binomial name
- Dasycnemia depressalis Ragonot, 1891

Species of moth

Dasycnemia depressalis is a species of snout moth in the genus Dasycnemia. It was described by Ragonot in 1891, and is known from Peru.
