= Ocrisiodes ruptifasciella =

Scientific classification
- Domain: Eukaryota
- Kingdom: Animalia
- Phylum: Arthropoda
- Class: Insecta
- Order: Lepidoptera
- Family: Pyralidae
- Genus: Ocrisiodes
- Species: O. ruptifasciella

Binomial name
- Ocrisiodes ruptifasciella (Ragonot, 1887)

Synonyms
- Pristophora ruptifasciella Ragonot, 1887; Ocrisiodes chirazalis Amsel, 1950

Species of moth

Ocrisiodes ruptifasciella is a species of snout moth in the genus Ocrisiodes. It was described by Ragonot in 1887, and is known from Uzbekistan and Iran.
