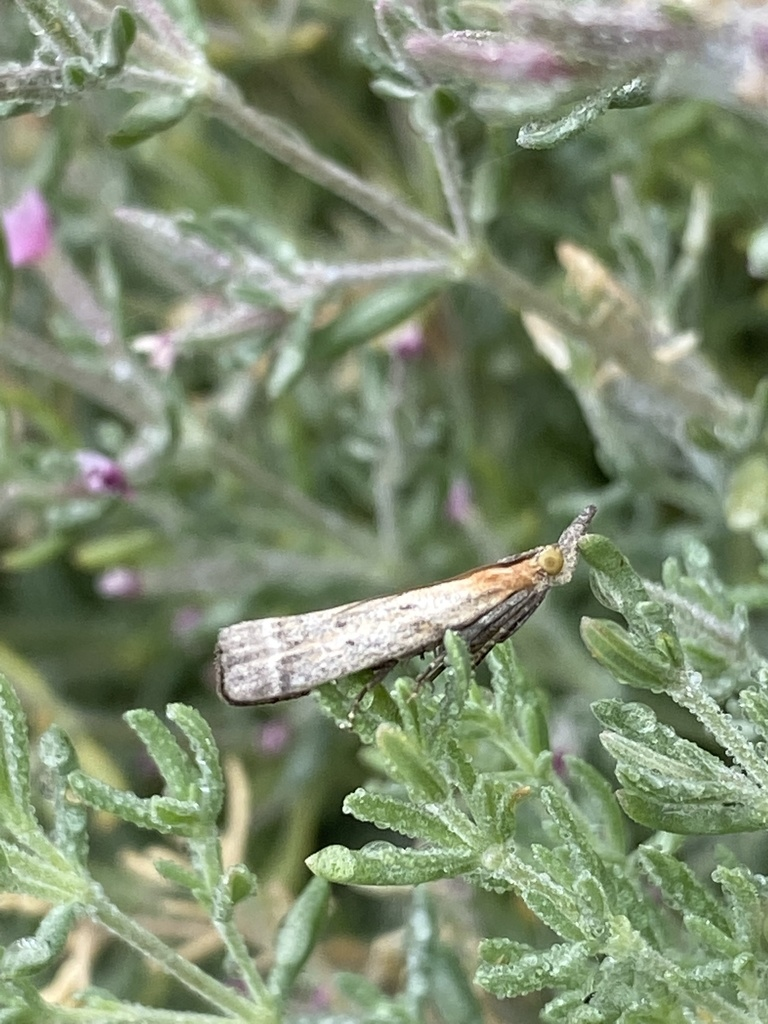

Scientific classification
- Domain: Eukaryota
- Kingdom: Animalia
- Phylum: Arthropoda
- Class: Insecta
- Order: Lepidoptera
- Family: Pyralidae
- Genus: Lipographis
- Species: L. truncatella

Binomial name
- Lipographis truncatella (Wright, 1916)

Synonyms
- Hypochalcia truncatella Wright, 1916

= Lipographis truncatella =

Species of moth

Lipographis truncatella is a species of snout moth in the genus Lipographis. It was described by William S. Wright in 1916 and is known from the US states of California and Nevada.
