= Dasycnemia naparimalis =

Scientific classification
- Domain: Eukaryota
- Kingdom: Animalia
- Phylum: Arthropoda
- Class: Insecta
- Order: Lepidoptera
- Family: Pyralidae
- Genus: Dasycnemia
- Species: D. naparimalis

Binomial name
- Dasycnemia naparimalis (Kaye, 1925)

Synonyms
- Hyalosticta naparimalis Kaye, 1925

Species of moth

Dasycnemia naparimalis is a species of snout moth in the genus Dasycnemia. It was described by William James Kaye in 1925 and is known from Trinidad.
