= Drescoma cyrdipsa =

Scientific classification
- Kingdom: Animalia
- Phylum: Arthropoda
- Class: Insecta
- Order: Lepidoptera
- Family: Pyralidae
- Genus: Drescoma
- Species: D. cyrdipsa

Binomial name
- Drescoma cyrdipsa Dyar, 1914

Species of moth

Drescoma cyrdipsa is a species of snout moth in the genus Drescoma. It was described by Harrison Gray Dyar Jr. in 1914 and is known from Panama, Costa Rica, Mexico, Guatemala, French Guiana and Brazil.
