= Azaera lophophora =

Scientific classification
- Kingdom: Animalia
- Phylum: Arthropoda
- Class: Insecta
- Order: Lepidoptera
- Family: Pyralidae
- Genus: Azaera
- Species: A. lophophora

Binomial name
- Azaera lophophora (Dyar, 1912)

Synonyms
- Calamophleps lophophora Dyar, 1914

Species of moth

Azaera lophophora is a species of snout moth in the genus Azaera. It was described by Harrison Gray Dyar Jr. in 1912, and is known from Panama.
