= Dasycnemia rufofascialis =

Scientific classification
- Domain: Eukaryota
- Kingdom: Animalia
- Phylum: Arthropoda
- Class: Insecta
- Order: Lepidoptera
- Family: Pyralidae
- Genus: Dasycnemia
- Species: D. rufofascialis

Binomial name
- Dasycnemia rufofascialis (Capps, 1952)

Synonyms
- Potosa rufofascialis Capps, 1952

Species of moth

Dasycnemia rufofascialis is a species of snout moth in the genus Dasycnemia. It was described by Hahn William Capps in 1952 and is known from Mexico.
