= Diatomocera dosia =

Scientific classification
- Domain: Eukaryota
- Kingdom: Animalia
- Phylum: Arthropoda
- Class: Insecta
- Order: Lepidoptera
- Family: Pyralidae
- Genus: Diatomocera
- Species: D. dosia

Binomial name
- Diatomocera dosia (Dyar, 1914)

Synonyms
- Cabima dosia Dyar, 1914

Species of moth

Diatomocera dosia is a species of snout moth in the genus Diatomocera. It was described by Harrison Gray Dyar Jr. in 1914 and is known from Panama.
