= Ocrisiodes dispergella =

Scientific classification
- Domain: Eukaryota
- Kingdom: Animalia
- Phylum: Arthropoda
- Class: Insecta
- Order: Lepidoptera
- Family: Pyralidae
- Genus: Ocrisiodes
- Species: O. dispergella

Binomial name
- Ocrisiodes dispergella (Ragonot, 1887)

Synonyms
- Pristophora dispergella Ragonot, 1887

Species of moth

Ocrisiodes dispergella is a species of snout moth in the genus Ocrisiodes. It was described by Ragonot in 1887, and is known from Turkmenistan.
