= Dasycnemia obliqualis =

Scientific classification
- Kingdom: Animalia
- Phylum: Arthropoda
- Class: Insecta
- Order: Lepidoptera
- Family: Pyralidae
- Genus: Dasycnemia
- Species: D. obliqualis

Binomial name
- Dasycnemia obliqualis (Hampson, 1897)

Synonyms
- Hyalosticta obliqualis Hampson, 1897

Species of moth

Dasycnemia obliqualis is a species of snout moth in the genus Dasycnemia. It was described by George Hampson in 1897 and is known from Brazil.
