= Nevacolima zodia =

Scientific classification
- Kingdom: Animalia
- Phylum: Arthropoda
- Class: Insecta
- Order: Lepidoptera
- Family: Pyralidae
- Genus: Nevacolima
- Species: N. zodia

Binomial name
- Nevacolima zodia Neunzig, 1994

Species of moth

Nevacolima zodia is a species of snout moth in the genus Nevacolima. It is found in west-central Mexico.

The length of the forewings is about 7 mm.
