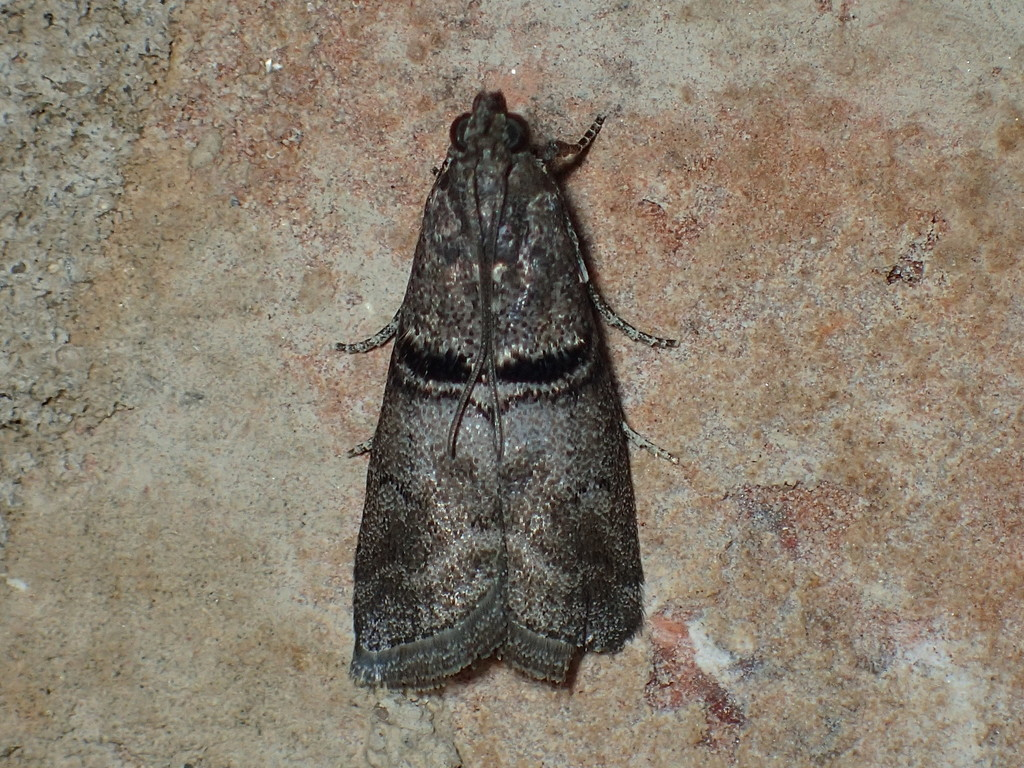

Scientific classification
- Kingdom: Animalia
- Phylum: Arthropoda
- Class: Insecta
- Order: Lepidoptera
- Family: Pyralidae
- Genus: Immyrla
- Species: I. nigrovittella

Binomial name
- Immyrla nigrovittella Dyar, 1906

= Immyrla nigrovittella =

Species of moth

Immyrla nigrovittella is a species of snout moth in the genus Immyrla. It was described by Harrison Gray Dyar Jr. in 1906 and is known from eastern North America, including Alabama, Illinois, Maryland, Michigan, Mississippi, Ohio, Ontario, Pennsylvania, Quebec, Tennessee and West Virginia.
