= Cosmethella unipectinalis =

Scientific classification
- Kingdom: Animalia
- Phylum: Arthropoda
- Class: Insecta
- Order: Lepidoptera
- Family: Pyralidae
- Genus: Cosmethella
- Species: C. unipectinalis

Binomial name
- Cosmethella unipectinalis (Hampson, 1906)

Synonyms
- Vitessa unipectinalis Hampson, 1906

Species of moth

Cosmethella unipectinalis is a species of snout moth. It was described by George Hampson in 1906. It is found in the Solomon Islands.
