= Nefundella dentata =

Scientific classification
- Kingdom: Animalia
- Phylum: Arthropoda
- Class: Insecta
- Order: Lepidoptera
- Family: Pyralidae
- Genus: Nefundella
- Species: N. dentata

Binomial name
- Nefundella dentata Neunzig & Dow, 1993

Species of moth

Nefundella dentata is a species of snout moth in the genus Nefundella. It is found in Belize.
