= Centrometopia atrisparsella =

Scientific classification
- Domain: Eukaryota
- Kingdom: Animalia
- Phylum: Arthropoda
- Class: Insecta
- Order: Lepidoptera
- Family: Pyralidae
- Genus: Centrometopia
- Species: C. atrisparsella

Binomial name
- Centrometopia atrisparsella Ragonot, 1887

Species of moth

Centrometopia atrisparsella is a species of snout moth. It was described by Émile Louis Ragonot in 1887 and is known from Turkmenistan.

The wingspan is about 23 mm.
