= Cosmethella minor =

Scientific classification
- Kingdom: Animalia
- Phylum: Arthropoda
- Clade: Pancrustacea
- Class: Insecta
- Order: Lepidoptera
- Family: Pyralidae
- Genus: Cosmethella
- Species: C. minor

Binomial name
- Cosmethella minor Munroe & M. Shaffer, 1980

Species of moth

Cosmethella minor is a species of snout moth. It was described by Eugene G. Munroe and M. Shaffer in 1980 and is known from Papua New Guinea.
