= Azaera muciella =

Scientific classification
- Domain: Eukaryota
- Kingdom: Animalia
- Phylum: Arthropoda
- Class: Insecta
- Order: Lepidoptera
- Family: Pyralidae
- Genus: Azaera
- Species: A. muciella

Binomial name
- Azaera muciella (Schaus, 1913)

Synonyms
- Calamophleps muciella Schaus, 1913; Calamophleps squalidella Dyar, 1914; Azaera squalidella

Species of moth

Azaera muciella is a species of snout moth. It was described by Schaus in 1913. It is found in Central America, including Costa Rica and Panama.
