= Odontarthria tropica =

Scientific classification
- Domain: Eukaryota
- Kingdom: Animalia
- Phylum: Arthropoda
- Class: Insecta
- Order: Lepidoptera
- Family: Pyralidae
- Genus: Odontarthria
- Species: O. tropica

Binomial name
- Odontarthria tropica Roesler, 1983

Species of moth

Odontarthria tropica is a species of snout moth in the genus Odontarthria. It was described by Roesler in 1983, and is known from Sumatra (including Dolok Merangir, the type locality).
