= Ocrisiodes taftanella =

Scientific classification
- Domain: Eukaryota
- Kingdom: Animalia
- Phylum: Arthropoda
- Class: Insecta
- Order: Lepidoptera
- Family: Pyralidae
- Genus: Ocrisiodes
- Species: O. taftanella

Binomial name
- Ocrisiodes taftanella Amsel, 1950

Species of moth

Ocrisiodes taftanella is a species of snout moth in the genus Ocrisiodes. It was described by Hans Georg Amsel in 1950 and is known from Iran.
