= Nefundella tolerata =

Scientific classification
- Kingdom: Animalia
- Phylum: Arthropoda
- Class: Insecta
- Order: Lepidoptera
- Family: Pyralidae
- Genus: Nefundella
- Species: N. tolerata

Binomial name
- Nefundella tolerata (Heinrich, 1956)

Synonyms
- Difundella tolerata Heinrich, 1956

Species of moth

Nefundella tolerata is a species of snout moth in the genus Nefundella. It is found in Bolivia.
