= Cosmethella major =

Scientific classification
- Domain: Eukaryota
- Kingdom: Animalia
- Phylum: Arthropoda
- Class: Insecta
- Order: Lepidoptera
- Family: Pyralidae
- Genus: Cosmethella
- Species: C. major

Binomial name
- Cosmethella major Munroe & M. Shaffer, 1980

Species of moth

Cosmethella major is a species of snout moth. It was described by Eugene G. Munroe and M. Shaffer in 1980 and is known from Papua New Guinea.
