= Ocrisiodes minimella =

Scientific classification
- Domain: Eukaryota
- Kingdom: Animalia
- Phylum: Arthropoda
- Class: Insecta
- Order: Lepidoptera
- Family: Pyralidae
- Genus: Ocrisiodes
- Species: O. minimella

Binomial name
- Ocrisiodes minimella (Amsel, 1970)

Synonyms
- Pristophorodes minimella Amsel, 1970

Species of moth

Ocrisiodes minimella is a species of snout moth in the genus Ocrisiodes. It was described by Hans Georg Amsel in 1970 and is known from Afghanistan.
