= Ocrisiodes antiopa =

Scientific classification
- Domain: Eukaryota
- Kingdom: Animalia
- Phylum: Arthropoda
- Class: Insecta
- Order: Lepidoptera
- Family: Pyralidae
- Genus: Ocrisiodes
- Species: O. antiopa

Binomial name
- Ocrisiodes antiopa Roesler, 1988

Species of moth

Ocrisiodes antiopa is a species of snout moth in the genus Ocrisiodes. It was described by Roesler in 1988, and is known from Iran.
