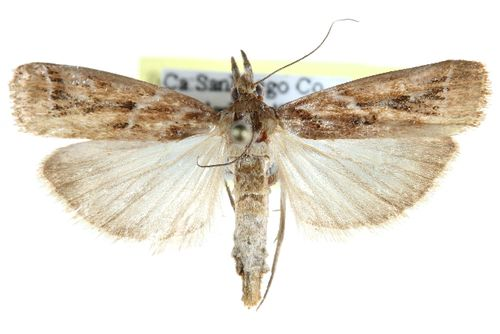

Scientific classification
- Kingdom: Animalia
- Phylum: Arthropoda
- Clade: Pancrustacea
- Class: Insecta
- Order: Lepidoptera
- Family: Pyralidae
- Genus: Lipographis
- Species: L. umbrella

Binomial name
- Lipographis umbrella (Dyar, 1908)

Synonyms
- Sarata umbrella Dyar, 1908

= Lipographis umbrella =

Species of moth

Lipographis umbrella is a species of snout moth in the genus Lipographis. It was described by Harrison Gray Dyar Jr. in 1908, and is known from the US state of California.
