= Hypodaria =

Scientific classification
- Domain: Eukaryota
- Kingdom: Animalia
- Phylum: Arthropoda
- Class: Insecta
- Order: Lepidoptera
- Family: Pyralidae
- Subfamily: Phycitinae
- Genus: Hypodaria (Hartig, 1939)
- Species: H. myeloisiformis

Binomial name
- Hypodaria myeloisiformis (Hartig, 1937)

Synonyms
- Genus: Paradaria Hartig, 1937 (preocc.); Species: Paradaria myeloisiformis Hartig, 1937

Genus of moths

Hypodaria is a monotypic snout moth genus described by Friedrich Hartig in 1939. Its single species, Hypodaria myeloisiformis, described by the same author two years earlier, is found in Afghanistan.
