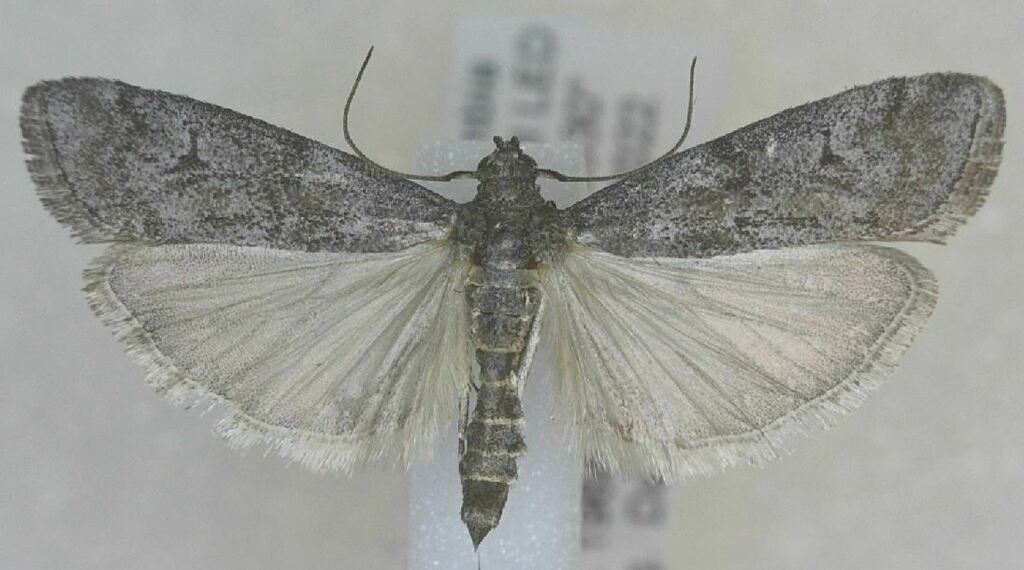

Scientific classification
- Domain: Eukaryota
- Kingdom: Animalia
- Phylum: Arthropoda
- Class: Insecta
- Order: Lepidoptera
- Family: Pyralidae
- Subfamily: Phycitinae
- Genus: Cuniberta; Heinrich, 1956
- Species: C. subtinctella

Binomial name
- Cuniberta subtinctella (Ragonot, 1887)

Synonyms
- Nephopterix subtinctella Ragonot 1887

= Cuniberta =

Genus of moths

Cuniberta is a monotypic snout moth genus described by Carl Heinrich in 1956. Its only species, Cuniberta subtinctella, was first described by Émile Louis Ragonot in 1887. It is found in the western United States.

The wingspan is 22–26 mm. The forewings are gray, more or less dusted with whitish on the basal and median areas. The antemedial line is nearly vertical and bordered outwardly by a black line which is expanded and strongly accented on the costa, bordered inwardly on the lower margin by a reddish or reddish olivaceous patch. The hindwings are pale smoky fuscous.
