= Calamotropodes =

Scientific classification
- Domain: Eukaryota
- Kingdom: Animalia
- Phylum: Arthropoda
- Class: Insecta
- Order: Lepidoptera
- Family: Pyralidae
- Subfamily: Phycitinae
- Genus: Calamotropodes; Janse, 1922
- Species: C. grisella

Binomial name
- Calamotropodes grisella Janse, 1922

Synonyms
- Calamotropodus Janse, 1922

Species of moth

Calamotropodes is a monotypic snout moth genus described by Anthonie Johannes Theodorus Janse in 1922. Its only species, Calamotropodes grisella, described in the same publication, is found in Zimbabwe.
