= Comotia =

Scientific classification
- Domain: Eukaryota
- Kingdom: Animalia
- Phylum: Arthropoda
- Class: Insecta
- Order: Lepidoptera
- Family: Pyralidae
- Subfamily: Phycitinae
- Genus: Comotia; Dyar, 1914
- Species: C. torsicornis

Binomial name
- Comotia torsicornis Dyar, 1914

Genus of moths

Comotia is a monotypic snout moth genus described by Harrison Gray Dyar Jr. in 1914. It is known from Mexico. It contains the species Comotia torsicornis, described by the same author, found in Panama.
