= Birinus russeolus =

Scientific classification
- Kingdom: Animalia
- Phylum: Arthropoda
- Clade: Pancrustacea
- Class: Insecta
- Order: Lepidoptera
- Family: Pyralidae
- Subfamily: Phycitinae
- Genus: Birinus; Heinrich, 1956
- Species: B. russeolus

Binomial name
- Birinus russeolus Heinrich, 1956

Species of moth

Birinus is a monotypic snout moth genus. Its only species, Birinus russeolus, is found in Guyana. Both the genus and species were described by Carl Heinrich in 1956.
