= Amphiderita =

Scientific classification
- Domain: Eukaryota
- Kingdom: Animalia
- Phylum: Arthropoda
- Class: Insecta
- Order: Lepidoptera
- Family: Pyralidae
- Genus: Amphiderita; Turner, 1925
- Species: A. pyrospila

Binomial name
- Amphiderita pyrospila Turner, 1925

Genus of moths

Amphiderita is a genus of snout moths described by Alfred Jefferis Turner in 1925. Its single species, Amphiderita pyrospila, was named by the same author in the same year. It is found in Australia.
