= Neocoristis =

Scientific classification
- Kingdom: Animalia
- Phylum: Arthropoda
- Class: Insecta
- Order: Lepidoptera
- Family: Pyralidae
- Subfamily: Phycitinae
- Genus: Neocoristis; Meyrick, 1937
- Species: N. entomophaga

Binomial name
- Neocoristis entomophaga Meyrick, 1937

Genus of moths

Neocoristis is a monotypic snout moth genus described by Edward Meyrick in 1937. Its only species, Neocoristis entomophaga, was described by the same author in the same year. It is known from Java, Indonesia (including Telawa, the type location).
