= Eurythmasis =

Scientific classification
- Kingdom: Animalia
- Phylum: Arthropoda
- Class: Insecta
- Order: Lepidoptera
- Family: Pyralidae
- Subfamily: Phycitinae
- Genus: Eurythmasis; Dyar, 1914
- Species: E. ignifatua

Binomial name
- Eurythmasis ignifatua Dyar, 1914

Genus of moths

Eurythmasis is a monotypic snout moth genus described by Harrison Gray Dyar Jr. in 1914. It contains the species Eurythmasis ignifatua, described by the same author. It is found in Panama.
