= Oligochroides =

Scientific classification
- Domain: Eukaryota
- Kingdom: Animalia
- Phylum: Arthropoda
- Class: Insecta
- Order: Lepidoptera
- Family: Pyralidae
- Subfamily: Phycitinae
- Genus: Oligochroides; Strand, 1909
- Species: O. nigritella

Binomial name
- Oligochroides nigritella Strand, 1909

Genus of moths

Oligochroides is a monotypic snout moth genus described by Embrik Strand in 1909. Its only species, Oligochroides nigritella, described in the same article, is found in South Africa.
