= Moodnodes =

Scientific classification
- Kingdom: Animalia
- Phylum: Arthropoda
- Class: Insecta
- Order: Lepidoptera
- Family: Pyralidae
- Subfamily: Phycitinae
- Genus: Moodnodes; Neunzig, 1990
- Species: M. plorella

Binomial name
- Moodnodes plorella (Dyar, 1914)

Synonyms
- Ephestiodes plorella Dyar, 1914; Eurythmia vestilla Dyar, 1914

Genus of moths

Moodnodes plorella is a species of snout moth, and the only species in the genus Moodnodes. The species was described by Harrison Gray Dyar Jr. in 1914, originally under the genus Ephestiodes, but was subsequently moved to Moodnodes. It was described from Panama (including Corazal, the type location), but is also known from the US state of Florida. The genus was described by Herbert H. Neunzig in 1990.
