= Epiepischnia =

Scientific classification
- Domain: Eukaryota
- Kingdom: Animalia
- Phylum: Arthropoda
- Class: Insecta
- Order: Lepidoptera
- Family: Pyralidae
- Subfamily: Phycitinae
- Genus: Epiepischnia; Amsel, 1954
- Species: E. pseudolydella

Binomial name
- Epiepischnia pseudolydella Amsel, 1954

Genus of moths

Epiepischnia is a monotypic snout moth genus described by Hans Georg Amsel in 1954. Its single species, Epiepischnia pseudolydella, described by the same author, is found in Iran.
