= Ciliocera =

Scientific classification
- Kingdom: Animalia
- Phylum: Arthropoda
- Class: Insecta
- Order: Lepidoptera
- Family: Pyralidae
- Subfamily: Phycitinae
- Genus: Ciliocera; Amsel, 1954
- Species: C. leucosarca

Binomial name
- Ciliocera leucosarca (Meyrick, 1937)

Synonyms
- Emmalocera leucosarca Meyrick, 1937

Genus of moths

Ciliocera is a monotypic snout moth genus described by Hans Georg Amsel in 1954. Its single species, Ciliocera leucosarca, described by Edward Meyrick in 1937, is found in Iraq. Moths of this species fly at a height of 4,000 to 7,000 feet (1,200 to 2,100 m).
