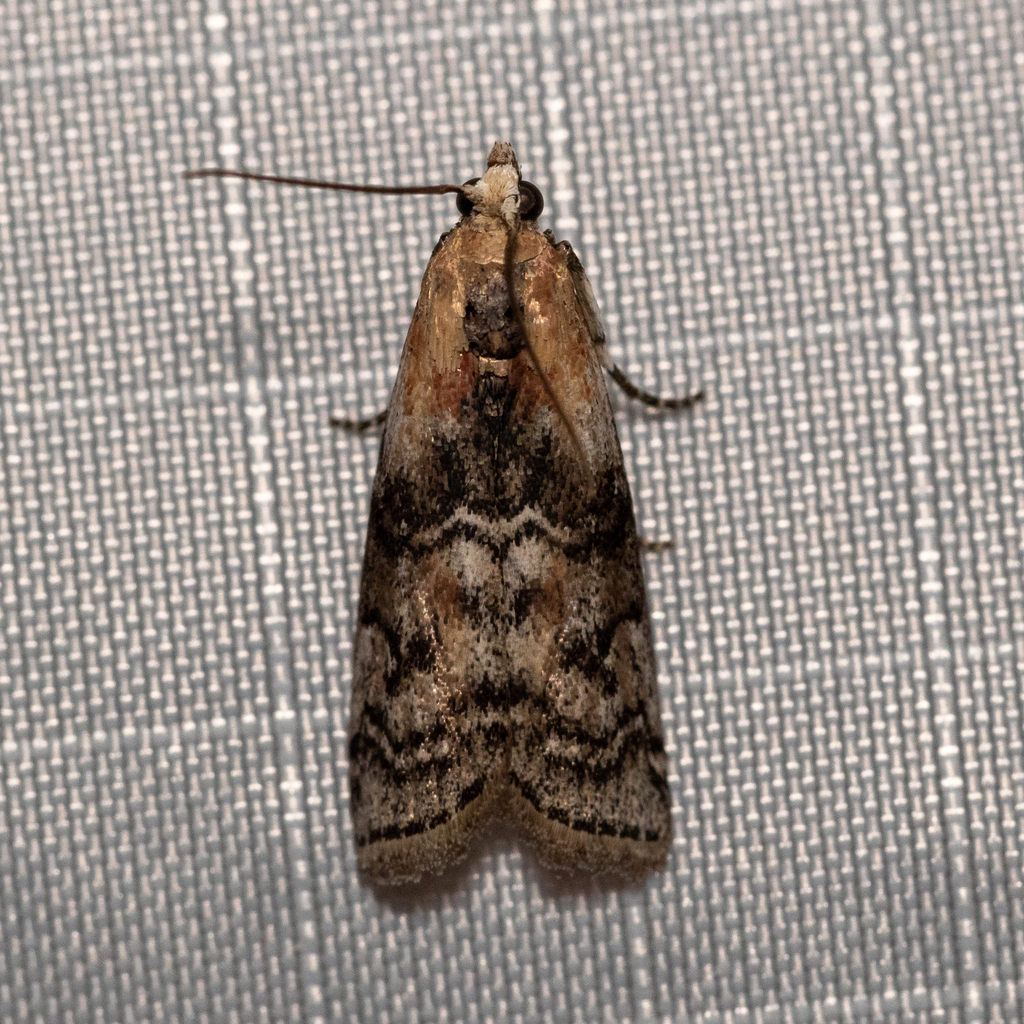

Scientific classification
- Kingdom: Animalia
- Phylum: Arthropoda
- Clade: Pancrustacea
- Class: Insecta
- Order: Lepidoptera
- Family: Pyralidae
- Subfamily: Phycitinae
- Genus: Glyptocera; Ragonot, 1889
- Species: G. consobrinella

Binomial name
- Glyptocera consobrinella (Zeller, 1872)

Synonyms
- Nephopteryx consobrinella Zeller 1872; Ambesa busckella Dyar 1904

= Glyptocera =

Genus of moths

Glyptocera is a genus of snout moths. It was described by Ragonot in 1889, and contains the species G. consobrinella. It is found in eastern North America, including Alabama, Florida, Illinois, Maryland, Michigan, Mississippi, Nova Scotia, Ohio, Oklahoma, Ontario, and Quebec.

The larvae feed on Viburnum (including Viburnum lentago) and Acer species.
