= Anemmalocera =

Scientific classification
- Domain: Eukaryota
- Kingdom: Animalia
- Phylum: Arthropoda
- Class: Insecta
- Order: Lepidoptera
- Family: Pyralidae
- Subfamily: Phycitinae
- Genus: Anemmalocera; Amsel, 1961
- Species: A. flavescentella

Binomial name
- Anemmalocera flavescentella Amsel, 1961

Genus of moths

Anemmalocera is a monotypic snout moth genus described by Hans Georg Amsel in 1961. It contains the single species, Anemmalocera flavescentella, described by the same author, which is found in Iran.
