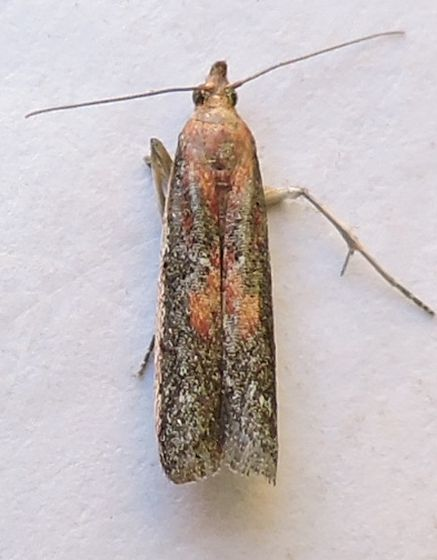

Scientific classification
- Domain: Eukaryota
- Kingdom: Animalia
- Phylum: Arthropoda
- Class: Insecta
- Order: Lepidoptera
- Family: Pyralidae
- Subfamily: Phycitinae
- Genus: Eurythmidia; Hampson in Ragonot, 1901
- Species: E. ignidorsella

Binomial name
- Eurythmidia ignidorsella (Ragonot, 1887)

Synonyms
- Eurythmia ignidorsella Ragonot, 1887

= Eurythmidia =

Genus of moths

Eurythmidia is a monotypic snout moth genus described by George Hampson in 1901. Its only species, Eurythmidia ignidorsella, was first described by Émile Louis Ragonot in 1887. It is found in Arizona, Mexico and Panama.
