= Monotonia =

Scientific classification
- Kingdom: Animalia
- Phylum: Arthropoda
- Class: Insecta
- Order: Lepidoptera
- Family: Pyralidae
- Subfamily: Phycitinae
- Genus: Monotonia; Amsel, 1955
- Species: M. straminella

Binomial name
- Monotonia straminella (Zerny, 1914)

Genus of moths

Monotonia is a genus of snout moths described by Hans Georg Amsel in 1955. Its single species, Monotonia straminella, was described much earlier in another genus. It is found in the Middle East.
