= Farnobia =

Scientific classification
- Domain: Eukaryota
- Kingdom: Animalia
- Phylum: Arthropoda
- Class: Insecta
- Order: Lepidoptera
- Family: Pyralidae
- Subfamily: Phycitinae
- Genus: Farnobia; Heinrich, 1956
- Species: F. quadripuncta

Binomial name
- Farnobia quadripuncta (Zeller, 1881)

Synonyms
- Euzophera quadripuncta Zeller, 1881; Dannemora quadripuncta

Genus of moths

Farnobia is a monotypic snout moth genus described by Carl Heinrich in 1956. Its only species, F. quadripuncta, described by Philipp Christoph Zeller in 1881, is found in Costa Rica, Panama, French Guiana and Colombia.

The wingspan is 21–24 mm. The forewings are brown with a purplish tint. The costal area is dusted with ocherous gray, extending into the cell at the middle. The hindwings are whitish and semihyaline, with a narrow dark line along the termen and dark shading on some of the veins.
