= Bethulia championella =

Scientific classification
- Kingdom: Animalia
- Phylum: Arthropoda
- Clade: Pancrustacea
- Class: Insecta
- Order: Lepidoptera
- Family: Pyralidae
- Subfamily: Phycitinae
- Genus: Bethulia; Ragonot, 1888
- Species: B. championella

Binomial name
- Bethulia championella Ragonot, 1888

Species of moth

Bethulia is a genus of snout moths. It was described by Ragonot, in 1888, and contains the species Bethulia championella. It is found in the south-western United States, Mexico, Central and northern South America.
