= Hafisia =

Scientific classification
- Domain: Eukaryota
- Kingdom: Animalia
- Phylum: Arthropoda
- Class: Insecta
- Order: Lepidoptera
- Family: Pyralidae
- Subfamily: Phycitinae
- Genus: Hafisia; Amsel, 1950
- Species: H. lundbladi

Binomial name
- Hafisia lundbladi Amsel, 1950

Genus of moths

Hafisia is a monotypic snout moth genus described by Hans Georg Amsel in 1950. Its single species, Hafisia lundbladi, described by the same author, is known from Iran.
