= Arimania =

Scientific classification
- Domain: Eukaryota
- Kingdom: Animalia
- Phylum: Arthropoda
- Class: Insecta
- Order: Lepidoptera
- Family: Pyralidae
- Subfamily: Phycitinae
- Genus: Arimania; Amsel, 1954
- Species: A. komaroffi

Binomial name
- Arimania komaroffi (Ragonot, 1888)

Synonyms
- Salebria komaroffi Ragonot, 1888; Salebria komaroffi var. amanella Zerny in Osthelder, 1935; Nephopteryx diplocapna Meyrick, 1937

Genus of moths

Arimania is a monotypic snout moth genus described by Hans Georg Amsel in 1954. Its only species, Arimania komaroffi, was described by Émile Louis Ragonot in 1888. It is found in Transcaucasia, Turkey, Iran and Iraq.

Adults are on wing from April to May and again from August to September in two generations per year.
