= Dentitegumia =

Scientific classification
- Kingdom: Animalia
- Phylum: Arthropoda
- Clade: Pancrustacea
- Class: Insecta
- Order: Lepidoptera
- Family: Pyralidae
- Subfamily: Phycitinae
- Genus: Dentitegumia; Amsel, 1961

Type species
- Pristophora nigrigranella Ragonot, 1890

Genus of moths

Dentitegumia is a genus of snout moths, family Pyralidae. It was described by Hans Georg Amsel in 1961. It is known from arid and semi-arid regions of North Africa (Algeria) and Asia (Iran, Afganistan, Xinjiang).

== Species ==
There are six recognized species:

- Dentitegumia afghanella Amsel, 1970
- Dentitegumia classica Roesler, 1989
- Dentitegumia dhana Roesler, 1989
- Dentitegumia hamiclaspera Gulzar & Li, 2026
- Dentitegumia nigrigranella (Ragonot, 1890)
- Dentitegumia sirjana Roesler, 1989
