= Edulica =

Scientific classification
- Kingdom: Animalia
- Phylum: Arthropoda
- Class: Insecta
- Order: Lepidoptera
- Family: Pyralidae
- Subfamily: Phycitinae
- Genus: Edulica; Hampson in Ragonot, 1901
- Species: E. compedella

Binomial name
- Edulica compedella Zeller, 1881

Genus of moths

Edulica is a monotypic snout moth genus first described by George Hampson in 1901. Its single species, Edulica compedella, described by Philipp Christoph Zeller in 1881, is found in Colombia.
