= Mesciniodes =

Scientific classification
- Domain: Eukaryota
- Kingdom: Animalia
- Phylum: Arthropoda
- Class: Insecta
- Order: Lepidoptera
- Family: Pyralidae
- Subfamily: Phycitinae
- Genus: Mesciniodes; Hampson in Ragonot, 1901
- Species: M. subinfractalis

Binomial name
- Mesciniodes subinfractalis Hampson in Ragonot, 1901

Synonyms
- Mesciniodes micans Hampson, 1896

Genus of moths

Mesciniodes is a monotypic snout moth genus described by George Hampson in 1901. Its only species, Mesciniodes subinfractalis, was described by the same author in the same year. It is found on Celebes and Borneo.
