= Lacipea =

Scientific classification
- Kingdom: Animalia
- Phylum: Arthropoda
- Class: Insecta
- Order: Lepidoptera
- Family: Pyralidae
- Subfamily: Phycitinae
- Genus: Lacipea; Walker, 1863
- Species: L. muscosella

Binomial name
- Lacipea muscosella Walker, 1863

Genus of moths

Lacipea is a monotypic snout moth genus described by Francis Walker in 1863. Its only species, Lacipea muscosella, was described by the same author in the same year and is found in Sri Lanka.
