= Ancylodinia =

Scientific classification
- Domain: Eukaryota
- Kingdom: Animalia
- Phylum: Arthropoda
- Class: Insecta
- Order: Lepidoptera
- Family: Pyralidae
- Subfamily: Phycitinae
- Genus: Ancylodinia de Joannis, 1913
- Species: A. rectilineella

Binomial name
- Ancylodinia rectilineella de Joannis, 1913

Genus of moths

Ancylodinia is a monotypic snout moth genus described by Joseph de Joannis in 1913. Its only species, Ancylodinia rectilineella, described by the same author in the same year, is known from Eritrea.
