= Hydaspia =

Scientific classification
- Kingdom: Animalia
- Phylum: Arthropoda
- Class: Insecta
- Order: Lepidoptera
- Family: Pyralidae
- Subfamily: Phycitinae
- Genus: Hydaspia; Ragonot, 1888
- Species: H. dorsipunctella

Binomial name
- Hydaspia dorsipunctella Ragonot, 1888

Genus of moths

Hydaspia is a monotypic snout moth genus described by Émile Louis Ragonot in 1888. Its single species, Hydaspia dorsipunctella, described by the same author in the same year, is found in Kashmir and South Africa.
