= Anthopteryx =

Scientific classification
- Kingdom: Animalia
- Phylum: Arthropoda
- Class: Insecta
- Order: Lepidoptera
- Family: Pyralidae
- Subfamily: Phycitinae
- Genus: Anthopteryx; Dyar, 1914
- Species: A. irichampa

Binomial name
- Anthopteryx irichampa Dyar, 1914

Genus of moths

Anthopteryx is a monotypic snout moth described by Harrison Gray Dyar Jr., an American entomologist, in 1914. Its single species, Anthopteryx irichampa, described in the same publication, is found in Panama.

The wingspan is about 14 mm.
