= Cyiza =

Scientific classification
- Kingdom: Animalia
- Phylum: Arthropoda
- Class: Insecta
- Order: Lepidoptera
- Family: Pyralidae
- Subfamily: Phycitinae
- Genus: Cyiza; Walker, 1864
- Species: C. punctalis

Binomial name
- Cyiza punctalis Walker, 1864

Genus of moths

Cyiza is a monotypic snout moth genus described by Francis Walker in 1864. Its only species, Cyiza punctalis, described by the same author in the same year, is found in Malaysia.
