= Magiriopsis =

Scientific classification
- Domain: Eukaryota
- Kingdom: Animalia
- Phylum: Arthropoda
- Class: Insecta
- Order: Lepidoptera
- Family: Pyralidae
- Subfamily: Phycitinae
- Genus: Magiriopsis; Heinrich, 1956
- Species: M. denticosella

Binomial name
- Magiriopsis denticosella (Dyar, 1912)

Synonyms
- Sematoneura denticosella Dyar, 1912

Genus of moths

Magiriopsis is a monotypic snout moth genus described by Carl Heinrich in 1956. Its only species, Magiriopsis denticosella, was described by Harrison Gray Dyar Jr. in 1912, as a species of Sematoneura, but was reassigned to Magiriopsis by Heinrich in 1956. It is found in Mexico.
