= Jakuarte =

Scientific classification
- Kingdom: Animalia
- Phylum: Arthropoda
- Class: Insecta
- Order: Lepidoptera
- Family: Pyralidae
- Subfamily: Phycitinae
- Genus: Jakuarte; Viette, 1953
- Species: J. martinalis

Binomial name
- Jakuarte martinalis Viette, 1953

Genus of moths

Jakuarte is a monotypic snout moth genus described by Pierre Viette in 1953. Its single species, Jakuarte martinalis, described in the same article, is known from Madagascar.
