= Eccopidia =

Scientific classification
- Kingdom: Animalia
- Phylum: Arthropoda
- Class: Insecta
- Order: Lepidoptera
- Family: Pyralidae
- Subfamily: Phycitinae
- Genus: Eccopidia; Hampson, 1899
- Species: E. strigata

Binomial name
- Eccopidia strigata Hampson, 1899

Genus of moths

Eccopidia is a monotypic snout moth genus. Its single species, Eccopidia strigata, is found in Sri Lanka. Both the genus and species were described by George Hampson in 1899.
