= Amphignostis =

Scientific classification
- Kingdom: Animalia
- Phylum: Arthropoda
- Class: Insecta
- Order: Lepidoptera
- Family: Pyralidae
- Subfamily: Phycitinae
- Genus: Amphignostis; Meyrick, 1934
- Species: A. nephelocentra

Binomial name
- Amphignostis nephelocentra Meyrick, 1934

Genus of moths

Amphignostis is a monotypic snout moth genus. Its only species, Amphignostis nephelocentra, is found in Mozambique. Both the genus and species were first described by Edward Meyrick in 1934.
