= Fissicera =

Scientific classification
- Domain: Eukaryota
- Kingdom: Animalia
- Phylum: Arthropoda
- Class: Insecta
- Order: Lepidoptera
- Family: Pyralidae
- Subfamily: Phycitinae
- Genus: Fissicera; J. C. Shaffer, 1978
- Species: F. spicata

Binomial name
- Fissicera spicata J. C. Shaffer, 1978

Genus of moths

Fissicera is a monotypic snout moth genus in the family Pyralidae. Its only species, Fissicera spicata, is found on Dominica. Both the genus and species were first described by Jay C. Shaffer in 1978.
