= Arescoptera =

Scientific classification
- Domain: Eukaryota
- Kingdom: Animalia
- Phylum: Arthropoda
- Class: Insecta
- Order: Lepidoptera
- Family: Pyralidae
- Genus: Arescoptera; Turner, 1911
- Species: A. idiotypa

Binomial name
- Arescoptera idiotypa Turner, 1911

Genus of moths

Arescoptera is a monotypic snout moth genus described by Alfred Jefferis Turner in 1911. It contains the single species, Arescoptera idiotypa, described in the same article. It is found in Australia, including New South Wales.
