= Dalakia =

Scientific classification
- Kingdom: Animalia
- Phylum: Arthropoda
- Class: Insecta
- Order: Lepidoptera
- Family: Pyralidae
- Subfamily: Phycitinae
- Genus: Dalakia; Amsel, 1961
- Species: D. uniformella

Binomial name
- Dalakia uniformella Amsel, 1961

Genus of moths

Dalakia is a monotypic snout moth genus described by Hans Georg Amsel in 1961. Its only species, Dalakia uniformella, is found in Iran and the United Arab Emirates.
