= Glyptoteles =

Scientific classification
- Kingdom: Animalia
- Phylum: Arthropoda
- Clade: Pancrustacea
- Class: Insecta
- Order: Lepidoptera
- Family: Pyralidae
- Subfamily: Phycitinae
- Genus: Glyptoteles; Zeller, 1848
- Species: G. leucacrinella

Binomial name
- Glyptoteles leucacrinella Zeller, 1848

Synonyms
- Nephopterix macra Staudinger, 1870

Genus of moths

Glyptoteles is a monotypic moth genus belonging to the family Pyralidae. Its single species, described by Philipp Christoph Zeller in 1848, Glyptoteles leucacrinella, is found in most of Europe except Great Britain, Ireland, Fennoscandia, Portugal and most of the Balkan Peninsula.

The caterpillars of G. leucacrinella have been noted for the unusual food they may eat – vegetable remains and dry leaves.

Otherwise, they feed on alder trees (Alnus).
