= Acrobasopsis =

Scientific classification
- Kingdom: Animalia
- Phylum: Arthropoda
- Clade: Pancrustacea
- Class: Insecta
- Order: Lepidoptera
- Family: Pyralidae
- Subfamily: Phycitinae
- Genus: Acrobasopsis; Amsel, 1958
- Species: A. acrobasella

Binomial name
- Acrobasopsis acrobasella (Rebel, 1927)

Synonyms
- Heterographis acrobasella Rebel, 1927; Acrobasopsis talhouki Amsel, 1958

Genus of moths

Acrobasopsis is a monotypic snout moth genus in the subfamily Phycitinae described by Hans Georg Amsel in 1958. It contains the species Acrobasopsis acrobasella, described by Hans Rebel in 1927, which is found in Egypt and Israel.

The larvae feed on Tamarix species.
