= Ocrisiodes =

Scientific classification
- Domain: Eukaryota
- Kingdom: Animalia
- Phylum: Arthropoda
- Class: Insecta
- Order: Lepidoptera
- Family: Pyralidae
- Subfamily: Phycitinae
- Genus: Ocrisiodes; Amsel, 1950

Synonyms
- Mechedia Amsel, 1951; Pristophorodes Amsel, 1953; Pristophora Ragonot, 1887; Uncinomorpha Amsel, 1958

Genus of moths

Ocrisiodes is a genus of snout moths described by Hans Georg Amsel in 1950.

== Species ==
- Ocrisiodes antiopa Roesler, 1988
- Ocrisiodes babaella (Amsel, 1970)
- Ocrisiodes bamella (Amsel, 1958)
- Ocrisiodes dispergella (Ragonot, 1887)
- Ocrisiodes minimella (Amsel, 1970)
- Ocrisiodes occulta Roesler, 1990
- Ocrisiodes polyptychella Ragonot, 1887
- Ocrisiodes ruptifasciella (Ragonot, 1887)
- Ocrisiodes senganella (Amsel, 1961)
- Ocrisiodes sesamella Roesler, 1988
- Ocrisiodes taftanella Amsel, 1950
- Ocrisiodes turkmeniensis Asselbergs, 2004
