= Dipsochares =

Scientific classification
- Kingdom: Animalia
- Phylum: Arthropoda
- Class: Insecta
- Order: Lepidoptera
- Family: Pyralidae
- Subfamily: Phycitinae
- Genus: Dipsochares; Meyrick, 1937
- Species: D. nephelopa

Binomial name
- Dipsochares nephelopa Meyrick, 1937

Genus of moths

Dipsochares is a monotypic snout moth genus. Its single species, Dipsochares nephelopa, is known from the Democratic Republic of the Congo. Both the genus and species were first described by Edward Meyrick in 1937.
