= Metephestia =

Scientific classification
- Domain: Eukaryota
- Kingdom: Animalia
- Phylum: Arthropoda
- Class: Insecta
- Order: Lepidoptera
- Family: Pyralidae
- Subfamily: Phycitinae
- Genus: Metephestia; Hampson in Ragonot, 1901
- Species: M. simplicula

Binomial name
- Metephestia simplicula (Zeller, 1881)

Synonyms
- Ephestia simplicula Zeller, 1881

Genus of moths

Metephestia is a monotypic snout moth genus described by George Hampson in 1901. Its only species, Metephestia simplicula, was described by Philipp Christoph Zeller in 1881. It is known from Colombia, southern Florida, Puerto Rico and the West Indies.

There are several generations per year.

The larvae feed on Indigofera species, including I. hirsuta, I. suffruticosa and I. tinctoria. Young larvae feed on unexpanded leaflets.
