= Anephopteryx =

Scientific classification
- Domain: Eukaryota
- Kingdom: Animalia
- Phylum: Arthropoda
- Class: Insecta
- Order: Lepidoptera
- Family: Pyralidae
- Subfamily: Phycitinae
- Genus: Anephopteryx; Amsel, 1955
- Species: A. designella

Binomial name
- Anephopteryx designella Amsel, 1955

Genus of moths

Anephopteryx is a monotypic snout moth genus described by Hans Georg Amsel in 1955. It contains the species A. designella, described by the same author, found in Iraq.
