= Hemiptilocera =

Scientific classification
- Domain: Eukaryota
- Kingdom: Animalia
- Phylum: Arthropoda
- Class: Insecta
- Order: Lepidoptera
- Family: Pyralidae
- Subfamily: Phycitinae
- Genus: Hemiptilocera; Ragonot, 1888
- Species: H. chionographella

Binomial name
- Hemiptilocera chionographella Ragonot, 1888

Genus of moths

Hemiptilocera is a monotypic snout moth genus described by Émile Louis Ragonot in 1888. Its single species, H. chionographella, described by the same author, is known from Peru.
