= Brachiolodes =

Scientific classification
- Domain: Eukaryota
- Kingdom: Animalia
- Phylum: Arthropoda
- Class: Insecta
- Order: Lepidoptera
- Family: Pyralidae
- Subfamily: Phycitinae
- Genus: Brachiolodes; Amsel, 1953
- Species: B. ziczac

Binomial name
- Brachiolodes ziczac Amsel, 1953

Genus of moths

Brachiolodes is a monotypic snout moth genus described by Hans Georg Amsel in 1953. Its single species, Brachiolodes ziczac, was described by the same author. It is found in Mauritania.
