= Microphestia =

Scientific classification
- Kingdom: Animalia
- Phylum: Arthropoda
- Class: Insecta
- Order: Lepidoptera
- Family: Pyralidae
- Subfamily: Phycitinae
- Genus: Microphestia; Dyar, 1914
- Species: M. animalcula

Binomial name
- Microphestia animalcula Dyar, 1914

Genus of moths

Microphestia animalcula is a species of snout moth, and the only species in the genus Microphestia. The species and the genus were described by Harrison Gray Dyar Jr. in 1914. It is found in Panama.
