= Laristania =

Scientific classification
- Domain: Eukaryota
- Kingdom: Animalia
- Phylum: Arthropoda
- Class: Insecta
- Order: Lepidoptera
- Family: Pyralidae
- Subfamily: Phycitinae
- Genus: Laristania; Amsel, 1951
- Species: L. sardzella

Binomial name
- Laristania sardzella Amsel, 1951

Genus of moths

Laristania is a monotypic snout moth genus described by Hans Georg Amsel in 1951. Its single species, Laristania sardzella, described by the same author, is found in Iran.
