= Eugyroptera =

Scientific classification
- Domain: Eukaryota
- Kingdom: Animalia
- Phylum: Arthropoda
- Class: Insecta
- Order: Lepidoptera
- Family: Pyralidae
- Subfamily: Phycitinae
- Genus: Eugyroptera; Bradley, 1977
- Species: E. robertsi

Binomial name
- Eugyroptera robertsi (Bradley, 1968)

Synonyms
- Genus: Gyroptera Bradley, 1968; Species: Gyroptera robertsi Bradley, 1968

Genus of moths

Eugyroptera is a monotypic snout moth genus described by John David Bradley in 1977. Its single species, Eugyroptera robertsi, described by the same author nine years earlier, is known from Nigeria.
