= Immyrla =

Scientific classification
- Domain: Eukaryota
- Kingdom: Animalia
- Phylum: Arthropoda
- Class: Insecta
- Order: Lepidoptera
- Family: Pyralidae
- Subfamily: Phycitinae
- Genus: Immyrla; Dyar, 1906

Genus of moths

Immyrla is a genus of snout moths in the family Pyralidae. It was described by Harrison Gray Dyar Jr. in 1906. The genus contains only one species, Immyrla nigrovittella. Snout moths are a type of pyralid moth, which are in turn a type of lepidopteran, or butterfly and moth, in the order Lepidoptera. Like all insects, snout moths belong to the phylum Arthropoda and the kingdom Animalia.

== Species ==
- Immyrla nigrovittella Dyar, 1906
