= Diatomocera =

Scientific classification
- Domain: Eukaryota
- Kingdom: Animalia
- Phylum: Arthropoda
- Class: Insecta
- Order: Lepidoptera
- Family: Pyralidae
- Subfamily: Phycitinae
- Genus: Diatomocera; Ragonot, 1893

Synonyms
- Cabima Dyar, 1914

Genus of moths

Diatomocera is a genus of snout moths. It was described by Émile Louis Ragonot in 1893.

== Species ==
- Diatomocera decurrens (Dyar, 1914)
- Diatomocera dosia (Dyar, 1914)
- Diatomocera hoplidice (Dyar, 1914)
- Diatomocera tenebricosa Zeller, 1881
