= Exodesis =

Scientific classification
- Kingdom: Animalia
- Phylum: Arthropoda
- Class: Insecta
- Order: Lepidoptera
- Family: Pyralidae
- Subfamily: Phycitinae
- Genus: Exodesis (Hampson, 1919)
- Species: E. vaterfieldi

Binomial name
- Exodesis vaterfieldi (Hampson, 1919)

Synonyms
- Exedesis vaterfieldi Hampson, 1919

Genus of moths

Exodesis is a monotypic snout moth genus described by George Hampson in 1919. Its only species, E. vaterfieldi, described in the same article, is found in Sudan.
