= Mildrixia =

Scientific classification
- Kingdom: Animalia
- Phylum: Arthropoda
- Class: Insecta
- Order: Lepidoptera
- Family: Pyralidae
- Subfamily: Phycitinae
- Genus: Mildrixia; Dyar, 1914
- Species: M. constitutionella

Binomial name
- Mildrixia constitutionella Dyar, 1914

Genus of moths

Mildrixia constitutionella is a species of snout moth, and the only species in the genus Mildrixia. The species and genus were described by Harrison Gray Dyar Jr. in 1914. It is found in Mexico.
