= Ogilvia =

Scientific classification
- Kingdom: Animalia
- Phylum: Arthropoda
- Class: Insecta
- Order: Lepidoptera
- Family: Pyralidae
- Subfamily: Phycitinae
- Genus: Ogilvia; Hampson, 1930
- Species: O. pulverealis

Binomial name
- Ogilvia pulverealis (Hampson, 1899)

Synonyms
- Hypogryphia pulverealis Hampson, 1899

Genus of moths

Ogilvia is a monotypic snout moth genus described by George Hampson in 1930. Its only species, Ogilvia pulverealis, was described by the same author but in 1899. It is found in Yemen.
