= Hannemanneia =

Scientific classification
- Domain: Eukaryota
- Kingdom: Animalia
- Phylum: Arthropoda
- Class: Insecta
- Order: Lepidoptera
- Family: Pyralidae
- Subfamily: Phycitinae
- Genus: Hannemanneia; Roesler, 1967
- Species: H. tacapella

Binomial name
- Hannemanneia tacapella (Ragonot, 1887)

Synonyms
- Cataremna tacapella Ragonot, 1887; Hyphantidium tacapella

Genus of moths

Hannemanneia is a monotypic snout moth genus described by Rolf-Ulrich Roesler in 1967. Its only species, Hannemanneia tacapella, was described by Émile Louis Ragonot in 1887. It is known from South Africa and Tunisia.
