= Anerosoma =

Scientific classification
- Domain: Eukaryota
- Kingdom: Animalia
- Phylum: Arthropoda
- Class: Insecta
- Order: Lepidoptera
- Family: Pyralidae
- Subfamily: Phycitinae
- Genus: Anerosoma; Roesler, 1971
- Species: A. apicipunctella

Binomial name
- Anerosoma apicipunctella (Caradja, 1925)

Synonyms
- Homoeosoma apicipunctella Caradja, 1925

Genus of moths

Anerosoma is a monotypic snout moth genus described by Rolf-Ulrich Roesler in 1971. Its only species, Anerosoma apicipunctella, described by Aristide Caradja in 1925, is found in China.
