= Catopyla =

Scientific classification
- Domain: Eukaryota
- Kingdom: Animalia
- Phylum: Arthropoda
- Class: Insecta
- Order: Lepidoptera
- Family: Pyralidae
- Subfamily: Phycitinae
- Genus: Catopyla; Bradley, 1968
- Species: C. dysorphnaea

Binomial name
- Catopyla dysorphnaea Bradley, 1968

Genus of moths

Catopyla is a monotypic snout moth genus described by John David Bradley in 1968. Its only species, Catopyla dysorphnaea, was described by the same author in the same year and is known from Nigeria.

The larvae feed on maize, Khaya ivorensis and Lovoa trichilioides. At first, they feed within individual seeds, but then move from fruit to fruit.
