= Azaera =

Scientific classification
- Domain: Eukaryota
- Kingdom: Animalia
- Phylum: Arthropoda
- Class: Insecta
- Order: Lepidoptera
- Family: Pyralidae
- Subfamily: Phycitinae
- Genus: Azaera; Schaus, 1913

Synonyms
- Calamophleps Dyar, 1914

Genus of moths

Azaera is a genus of snout moths. It was described by William Schaus in 1913.

== Species ==
- Azaera lophophora (Dyar, 1914)
- Azaera muciella (Schaus, 1913)
- Azaera nodoses (Dyar, 1914)
