= Letoa =

Scientific classification
- Kingdom: Animalia
- Phylum: Arthropoda
- Class: Insecta
- Order: Lepidoptera
- Family: Pyralidae
- Subfamily: Phycitinae
- Genus: Letoa; Walker, 1866
- Species: L. patulella

Binomial name
- Letoa patulella Walker, 1866

Genus of moths

Letoa is a monotypic snout moth genus described by Francis Walker in 1866. Its only species, Letoa patulella, described by the same author in the same year, is found in India.
