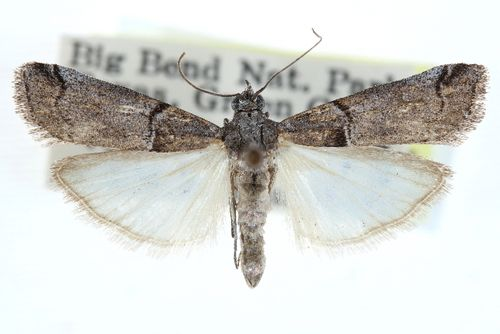

Scientific classification
- Domain: Eukaryota
- Kingdom: Animalia
- Phylum: Arthropoda
- Class: Insecta
- Order: Lepidoptera
- Family: Pyralidae
- Subfamily: Phycitinae
- Genus: Glyphocystis; A. Blanchard, 1973
- Species: G. viridivallis

Binomial name
- Glyphocystis viridivallis A. Blanchard, 1973

= Glyphocystis =

Genus of moths

Glyphocistis is a monotypic snout moth genus described by André Blanchard in 1973. Its only species, Glyphocistis viridivallis, described in the same article, is found in the US state of Texas.

The wingspan is 21–24 mm.
