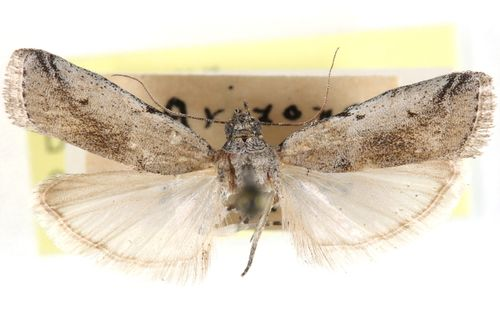

Scientific classification
- Kingdom: Animalia
- Phylum: Arthropoda
- Clade: Pancrustacea
- Class: Insecta
- Order: Lepidoptera
- Family: Pyralidae
- Subfamily: Phycitinae
- Genus: Adanarsa; Heinrich, 1956
- Species: A. intransitella

Binomial name
- Adanarsa intransitella (Dyar, 1907)

Synonyms
- Rhodophaea intransitella (Dyar, 1905)

= Adanarsa =

Genus of moths

Adanarsa is a monotypic snout moth genus in the subfamily Phycitinae. It was described by Carl Heinrich in 1956. It contains the species Adanarsa intransitella, which was originally described as Rhodophaea intransitella by Harrison Gray Dyar Jr. in 1905. It is found in North America, including Arizona, New Mexico and California.
