= Neopempelia =

Scientific classification
- Kingdom: Animalia
- Phylum: Arthropoda
- Class: Insecta
- Order: Lepidoptera
- Family: Pyralidae
- Subfamily: Phycitinae
- Genus: Neopempelia; Amsel, 1954
- Species: N. hieroglyphella

Binomial name
- Neopempelia hieroglyphella Ragonot, 1887

Synonyms
- Pempelia hieroglyphella Ragonot, 1887

Genus of moths

Neopempelia is a monotypic snout moth genus described by Hans Georg Amsel in 1954. Its only species, Neopempelia hieroglyphella, was described by Émile Louis Ragonot in 1887. It is found in Russia.
