= Epiparthia =

Scientific classification
- Domain: Eukaryota
- Kingdom: Animalia
- Phylum: Arthropoda
- Class: Insecta
- Order: Lepidoptera
- Family: Pyralidae
- Subfamily: Phycitinae
- Genus: Epiparthia; Amsel, 1935
- Species: E. vasta

Binomial name
- Epiparthia vasta Amsel, 1935

Genus of moths

Epiparthia is a monotypic snout moth genus described by Hans Georg Amsel in 1935. Its only species, Epiparthia vasta, described by the same author, is found in Jordan.
