= Masthala =

Scientific classification
- Kingdom: Animalia
- Phylum: Arthropoda
- Class: Insecta
- Order: Lepidoptera
- Family: Pyralidae
- Subfamily: Phycitinae
- Genus: Masthala; Walker, 1864
- Species: M. favillalella

Binomial name
- Masthala favillalella Walker, 1864

Genus of moths

Masthala is a monotypic snout moth genus described by Francis Walker in 1864. Its single species, Masthala favillalella, was described by the same author in the same year. It is found in Australia.
