= Cnephidia =

Scientific classification
- Domain: Eukaryota
- Kingdom: Animalia
- Phylum: Arthropoda
- Class: Insecta
- Order: Lepidoptera
- Family: Pyralidae
- Subfamily: Phycitinae
- Genus: Cnephidia; Ragonot, 1893
- Species: C. kenteriella

Binomial name
- Cnephidia kenteriella Ragonot, 1893

Genus of moths

Cnephidia is a genus of snout moths. It was described by Ragonot in 1893, and contains the species C. kenteriella. It is found in Siberia.
