= Melathrix =

Scientific classification
- Domain: Eukaryota
- Kingdom: Animalia
- Phylum: Arthropoda
- Class: Insecta
- Order: Lepidoptera
- Family: Pyralidae
- Subfamily: Phycitinae
- Genus: Melathrix; Ragonot, 1893
- Species: M. praetextella

Binomial name
- Melathrix praetextella (Christoph, 1877)

Synonyms
- Pempelia praetextella Christoph, 1877

Genus of moths

Melathrix is a monotypic snout moth genus described by Émile Louis Ragonot in 1893. Its only species, Melathrix praetextella, was described by Hugo Theodor Christoph in 1877, originally under the genus Pempelia, but was subsequently moved to Melathrix by Ragonot. It is known from Turkmenistan (including Krasnowodsk, the type location).
