= Gymnancylodes =

Scientific classification
- Domain: Eukaryota
- Kingdom: Animalia
- Phylum: Arthropoda
- Class: Insecta
- Order: Lepidoptera
- Family: Pyralidae
- Subfamily: Phycitinae
- Genus: Gymnancylodes; Amsel, 1968
- Species: G. psorosella

Binomial name
- Gymnancylodes psorosella Amsel, 1968

Genus of moths

Gymnancylodes is a monotypic snout moth genus described by Hans Georg Amsel in 1968. Its single species, Gymnancylodes psorosella, described by the same author, is found in Pakistan.
