= Mediophycis =

Scientific classification
- Kingdom: Animalia
- Phylum: Arthropoda
- Class: Insecta
- Order: Lepidoptera
- Family: Pyralidae
- Subfamily: Phycitinae
- Genus: Mediophycis; Roesler, 1982
- Species: M. attavella

Binomial name
- Mediophycis attavella (Viette, 1964)

Synonyms
- Hypsipyla attavella Viette, 1964

Genus of moths

Mediophycis is a monotypic snout moth genus described by Rolf-Ulrich Roesler in 1982. Its only species, Mediophycis attavella, was described by Pierre Viette in 1964. It is found in Madagascar.
