= Homodigma =

Scientific classification
- Kingdom: Animalia
- Phylum: Arthropoda
- Class: Insecta
- Order: Lepidoptera
- Family: Pyralidae
- Subfamily: Phycitinae
- Genus: Homodigma; Hampson, 1930
- Species: H. geera

Binomial name
- Homodigma geera Hampson, 1930

Genus of moths

Homodigma is a monotypic snout moth genus described by George Hampson in 1930. Its single species, Homodigma geera, described in the same year, is found in Sri Lanka.
