= Dasycnemia =

Scientific classification
- Domain: Eukaryota
- Kingdom: Animalia
- Phylum: Arthropoda
- Class: Insecta
- Order: Lepidoptera
- Family: Pyralidae
- Subfamily: Chrysauginae
- Genus: Dasycnemia; Ragonot, 1891

Synonyms
- Hyalosticta Hampson, 1897; Potosa Capps, 1952

Genus of moths

Dasycnemia is a genus of snout moths. It was described by Ragonot, in 1891, and is known from Peru, Trinidad, Brazil, and Mexico.

== Species ==
- Dasycnemia depressalis Ragonot, 1891
- Dasycnemia naparimalis (Kaye, 1925)
- Dasycnemia obliqualis (Hampson, 1897)
- Dasycnemia rufofascialis (Capps, 1952)
