= Ardjuna =

Scientific classification
- Kingdom: Animalia
- Phylum: Arthropoda
- Clade: Pancrustacea
- Class: Insecta
- Order: Lepidoptera
- Family: Pyralidae
- Genus: Ardjuna; Ruesler & Kuppers, 1979
- Species: A. kresna

Binomial name
- Ardjuna kresna Ruesler & Kuppers, 1979

Genus of moths

Ardjuna is a genus of snout moths. It contains the species Ardjuna kresna. It is found on northern Sumatra.
