= Lipographis =

Scientific classification
- Domain: Eukaryota
- Kingdom: Animalia
- Phylum: Arthropoda
- Class: Insecta
- Order: Lepidoptera
- Family: Pyralidae
- Genus: Lipographis; Ragonot, 1887

Genus of moths

Lipographis is a genus of snout moths described by Émile Louis Ragonot in 1887.

== Species ==
- Lipographis fenestrella (Packard, 1873)
- Lipographis truncatella (Wright, 1916)
- Lipographis umbrella (Dyar, 1908)
