= Palpusopsis =

Scientific classification
- Kingdom: Animalia
- Phylum: Arthropoda
- Class: Insecta
- Order: Lepidoptera
- Family: Pyralidae
- Subfamily: Phycitinae
- Genus: Palpusopsis; Amsel, 1959
- Species: P. roseella

Binomial name
- Palpusopsis roseella Amsel, 1959

Genus of moths

Palpusopsis is a monotypic snout moth genus described by Hans Georg Amsel in 1959. Its only species, Palpusopsis roseella, described by the same author, is known from south-eastern Iran.
