= Barberia =

Scientific classification
- Kingdom: Animalia
- Phylum: Arthropoda
- Clade: Pancrustacea
- Class: Insecta
- Order: Lepidoptera
- Family: Pyralidae
- Subfamily: Phycitinae
- Genus: Barberia; Dyar, 1905
- Species: B. affinitella

Binomial name
- Barberia affinitella Dyar, 1905

Genus of moths

Barberia is a monotypic genus of snout moths. It was described by Harrison Gray Dyar Jr. in 1905 and contains the species Barberia affinitella. It is found in the southern United States from California to Texas.

The wingspan is about 11 mm. The forewings are blackish brown with a broad white costal stripe.
