= Ethiopsella =

Scientific classification
- Kingdom: Animalia
- Phylum: Arthropoda
- Class: Insecta
- Order: Lepidoptera
- Family: Pyralidae
- Subfamily: Phycitinae
- Genus: Ethiopsella; Hampson, 1930
- Species: E. nasuta

Binomial name
- Ethiopsella nasuta Hampson, 1930

Genus of moths

Ethiopsella is a monotypic snout moth genus. Its only species, Ethiopsella nasuta, is found in Nigeria. Both the genus and species were described by George Hampson in 1930.
