= Indomalayia =

Scientific classification
- Kingdom: Animalia
- Phylum: Arthropoda
- Clade: Pancrustacea
- Class: Insecta
- Order: Lepidoptera
- Family: Pyralidae
- Genus: Indomalayia; Roesler & Küppers, 1979
- Species: I. flabellifera

Binomial name
- Indomalayia flabellifera (Hampson, 1896)

Synonyms
- Spatulipalpia flabellifera Hampson, 1896

Genus of moths

Indomalayia is a monotypic genus of snout moths that was first described by Rolf-Ulrich Roesler and Peter Victor Küppers in 1979. Its sole species is Indomalayia flabellifera, originally described by George Hampson in 1896 as Spatulipalpia flabellifera, which is found in India, Indonesia (Sumatra), Malaysia, New Zealand, Singapore, Sri Lanka and Fergusson Island and Australia.
