= Honorinus =

Scientific classification
- Domain: Eukaryota
- Kingdom: Animalia
- Phylum: Arthropoda
- Class: Insecta
- Order: Lepidoptera
- Family: Pyralidae
- Subfamily: Phycitinae
- Genus: Honorinus; Heinrich, 1956
- Species: H. fuliginosus

Binomial name
- Honorinus fuliginosus Heinrich, 1956

Genus of moths

Honorinus is a monotypic snout moth genus described by Carl Heinrich in 1956. Its only species, Honorinus fuliginosus, described by the same author in the same year, is found in Peru.
