= Odontarthria =

Scientific classification
- Domain: Eukaryota
- Kingdom: Animalia
- Phylum: Arthropoda
- Class: Insecta
- Order: Lepidoptera
- Family: Pyralidae
- Subfamily: Phycitinae
- Genus: Odontarthria; Ragonot, 1893

Genus of moths

Odontarthria is a genus of snout moths described by Émile Louis Ragonot in 1893.

== Species ==
- Odontarthria ochrivenella Ragonot, 1893
- Odontarthria tropica Roesler, 1983
