= Anjumania =

Scientific classification
- Domain: Eukaryota
- Kingdom: Animalia
- Phylum: Arthropoda
- Class: Insecta
- Order: Lepidoptera
- Family: Pyralidae
- Subfamily: Phycitinae
- Genus: Anjumania; Amsel, 1970
- Species: A. dimorphella

Binomial name
- Anjumania dimorphella Amsel, 1970

Genus of moths

Anjumania is a monotypic snout moth genus described by Hans Georg Amsel in 1970. It contains the species A. dimorphella, described by the same author. It is found in Afghanistan.
