= Micromescinia =

Scientific classification
- Domain: Eukaryota
- Kingdom: Animalia
- Phylum: Arthropoda
- Class: Insecta
- Order: Lepidoptera
- Family: Pyralidae
- Subfamily: Phycitinae
- Genus: Micromescinia; Dyar, 1914
- Species: M. pygmaea

Binomial name
- Micromescinia pygmaea Dyar, 1914

Single-species genus of moths

Micromescinia pygmaea is a species of snout moth in the monotypic genus Micromescinia. The species and genus were described by Harrison Gray Dyar Jr. in 1914. It is found in Panama.
