= Epichalcia =

Scientific classification
- Kingdom: Animalia
- Phylum: Arthropoda
- Class: Insecta
- Order: Lepidoptera
- Family: Pyralidae
- Subfamily: Phycitinae
- Genus: Epichalcia; Roesler, 1969
- Species: E. amasiella

Binomial name
- Epichalcia amasiella Roesler, 1969

Genus of moths

Epichalcia is a genus of snout moths. It was described by Roesler in 1969, and contains the species E. amasiella. It is found in Turkey.
