= Oedothmia =

Scientific classification
- Kingdom: Animalia
- Phylum: Arthropoda
- Class: Insecta
- Order: Lepidoptera
- Family: Pyralidae
- Subfamily: Phycitinae
- Genus: Oedothmia; Hampson, 1930
- Species: O. endopyrella

Binomial name
- Oedothmia endopyrella Hampson, 1930

Synonyms
- Genus: Synothmia Hampson, 1930; Species: Synothmia bahamasella Hampson, 1930

Genus of moths

Oedothmia is a monotypic snout moth genus described by George Hampson in 1930. Its only species, Oedothmia endopyrella, was described in the same article. It is known from Mexico and the Bahamas.
