= Ulophora =

Scientific classification
- Kingdom: Animalia
- Phylum: Arthropoda
- Class: Insecta
- Order: Lepidoptera
- Family: Pyralidae
- Subfamily: Phycitinae
- Genus: Ulophora; Ragonot, 1890

Synonyms
- Acromeseres Dyar, 1919

Genus of moths

Ulophora is a genus of moth of the family Pyralidae, subfamilia Phycitinae, described by Ragonot in 1890.

== Species ==
- Ulophora flavinia Balinsky, 1994 (southern Africa)
- Ulophora groteii Ragonot, 1890 (from the United States)
- Ulophora guarinella (Zeller, 1881) (from Central America, Cuba)
