= Peadus =

Scientific classification
- Kingdom: Animalia
- Phylum: Arthropoda
- Class: Insecta
- Order: Lepidoptera
- Family: Pyralidae
- Tribe: Phycitini
- Genus: Peadus; Heinrich, 1956

Genus of insects

Peadus is a genus of snout moths.

== Species ==
- Peadus bolivianus (Neunzig, 1989) (from Bolivia)
- Peadus burdettella (Schaus, 1913) (syn. Peadus semproniella (Schaus, 1913))
- Peadus dissitus Heinrich 1956
- Peadus subaquilella (Ragonot, 1888)
