= Gozmanyia =

Scientific classification
- Kingdom: Animalia
- Phylum: Arthropoda
- Clade: Pancrustacea
- Class: Insecta
- Order: Lepidoptera
- Family: Pyralidae
- Subfamily: Phycitinae
- Genus: Gozmanyia; Roesler, 1965
- Species: G. crassa

Binomial name
- Gozmanyia crassa (Amsel, 1935)

Synonyms
- Ephestia crassa Amsel, 1935

Genus of moths

Gozmanyia is a genus of snout moths. It was described by Roesler in 1965, and contains a single species, Gozmanyia crassa. It is found in the Palestinian Territories. It is also referred to as the knot-horn moth.
