= Jacutscia =

Scientific classification
- Kingdom: Animalia
- Phylum: Arthropoda
- Class: Insecta
- Order: Lepidoptera
- Family: Pyralidae
- Subfamily: Phycitinae
- Genus: Jacutscia; Hampson, 1930
- Species: J. strigata

Binomial name
- Jacutscia strigata Hampson, 1930

Genus of moths

Jacutscia is a monotypic snout moth genus described by George Hampson in 1930. Its single species, Jacutscia strigata, described in the same article, is found in Siberia.
