= Gorama =

Scientific classification
- Kingdom: Animalia
- Phylum: Arthropoda
- Class: Insecta
- Order: Lepidoptera
- Family: Pyralidae
- Subfamily: Phycitinae
- Genus: Gorama; Walker, 1866
- Species: G. strenuella

Binomial name
- Gorama strenuella Walker, 1866

Genus of moths

Gorama is a monotypic snout moth genus described by Francis Walker in 1866. Its single species, Gorama strenuella, was described by the same person in the same year, and is known from the Sula Islands.
