= Gregorempista =

Scientific classification
- Domain: Eukaryota
- Kingdom: Animalia
- Phylum: Arthropoda
- Class: Insecta
- Order: Lepidoptera
- Family: Pyralidae
- Subfamily: Phycitinae
- Genus: Gregorempista; Roesler, 1969
- Species: G. validella

Binomial name
- Gregorempista validella (Christoph, 1877)

Synonyms
- Genus: Gregormpista Whalley, 1970; Species: Nephopteryx validella Christoph, 1877

Genus of moths

Gregorempista is a monotypic snout moth genus described by Rolf-Ulrich Roesler in 1969. Its single species, Gregorempista validella, described by Hugo Theodor Christoph in 1877, is known from Turkmenistan.
