= Ditrachyptera =

Scientific classification
- Domain: Eukaryota
- Kingdom: Animalia
- Phylum: Arthropoda
- Class: Insecta
- Order: Lepidoptera
- Family: Pyralidae
- Subfamily: Phycitinae
- Genus: Ditrachyptera; Ragonot, 1893
- Species: D. verruciferella

Binomial name
- Ditrachyptera verruciferella Ragonot, 1888

Genus of moths

Ditrachyptera is a monotypic snout moth genus described by Émile Louis Ragonot in 1893. Its only species, Ditrachyptera verruciferella, described by the same author in 1888, is found in South Africa, the Gambia and the United Arab Emirates.
