= Caradjaria =

Scientific classification
- Domain: Eukaryota
- Kingdom: Animalia
- Phylum: Arthropoda
- Class: Insecta
- Order: Lepidoptera
- Family: Pyralidae
- Subfamily: Phycitinae
- Genus: Caradjaria; Roesler, 1975
- Species: C. asiatella

Binomial name
- Caradjaria asiatella Roesler, 1975

Genus of moths

Caradjaria is a genus of snout moths. It was described by Roesler, in 1975, and contains the species C. asiatella. It is found in China (including Shaanxi).
