= Lambaesia =

Scientific classification
- Kingdom: Animalia
- Phylum: Arthropoda
- Class: Insecta
- Order: Lepidoptera
- Family: Pyralidae
- Subfamily: Phycitinae
- Genus: Lambaesia; Rebel, 1903
- Species: L. caradjae

Binomial name
- Lambaesia caradjae Rebel, 1903

Synonyms
- Lambesia Whalley, 1970

Genus of moths

Lambaesia is a small genus of snout moths described by Hans Rebel in 1903. The species, Lambaesia caradjae, was described at the same time, and remained the sole member of the genus for many years. It is found in Algeria.

== Species ==
- Lambaesia caradjae Rebel, 1903
- Lambaesia fumosella (Ragonot, 1887)
- Lambaesia pistrinariella (Ragonot, 1887)
- Lambaesia pyraustella (Zerny, 1914)
