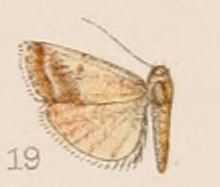

Scientific classification
- Kingdom: Animalia
- Phylum: Arthropoda
- Class: Insecta
- Order: Lepidoptera
- Family: Pyralidae
- Subfamily: Phycitinae
- Genus: Mascelia; Hampson, 1930
- Species: M. ectophoea

Binomial name
- Mascelia ectophoea (Hampson, 1908)

Synonyms
- Euzophera ectophoea Hampson, 1908; Euzophera ectophaea

= Mascelia =

Genus of moths

Mascelia is a monotypic snout moth genus described by George Hampson in 1930. Its only species, Mascelia ectophoea, was described by the same author in 1908. It is found in Sri Lanka and in India.

This species has a wingspan of 18 mm.
