= Harraria =

Scientific classification
- Kingdom: Animalia
- Phylum: Arthropoda
- Class: Insecta
- Order: Lepidoptera
- Family: Pyralidae
- Subfamily: Phycitinae
- Genus: Harraria; Hampson, 1930
- Species: H. rufipicta

Binomial name
- Harraria rufipicta Hampson, 1930

Genus of moths

Hararria is a monotypic snout moth genus described by George Hampson in 1930. Its single species, Harraria rufipicta, described in the same article, is found in Ethiopia.
