= Auxacia =

Scientific classification
- Domain: Eukaryota
- Kingdom: Animalia
- Phylum: Arthropoda
- Class: Insecta
- Order: Lepidoptera
- Family: Pyralidae
- Subfamily: Phycitinae
- Genus: Auxacia; Ragonot, 1888
- Species: A. bilineella

Binomial name
- Auxacia bilineella (Ragonot, 1887)

Synonyms
- Genus: Aria Ragonot, 1887; Species: Aria bilineella Ragonot, 1887; Auxacia bilinella

Genus of moths

Auxacia is a genus of snout moths. It was described by Émile Louis Ragonot in 1888 and contains the species Auxacia bilineella. It is found in Turkestan, Turkmenistan and Israel.
