= Centrometopia =

Scientific classification
- Domain: Eukaryota
- Kingdom: Animalia
- Phylum: Arthropoda
- Class: Insecta
- Order: Lepidoptera
- Family: Pyralidae
- Subfamily: Phycitinae
- Genus: Centrometopia; Ragonot, 1887

Genus of moths

Centrometopia is a genus of snout moths. It was described by Ragonot in 1887.

== Species ==
- Centrometopia atrisparsella (Ragonot, 1887)
- Centrometopia interruptella Ragonot, 1887
