= Amechedia =

Scientific classification
- Domain: Eukaryota
- Kingdom: Animalia
- Phylum: Arthropoda
- Class: Insecta
- Order: Lepidoptera
- Family: Pyralidae
- Subfamily: Phycitinae
- Genus: Amechedia; Amsel, 1961
- Species: A. pagmanella

Binomial name
- Amechedia pagmanella Amsel, 1961

Genus of moths

Amechedia is a monotypic snout moth genus described by Hans Georg Amsel in 1961. It contains the species Amechedia pagmanella, described in the same publication. It is found in Iran.
