= Oedilepia =

Scientific classification
- Kingdom: Animalia
- Phylum: Arthropoda
- Class: Insecta
- Order: Lepidoptera
- Family: Pyralidae
- Subfamily: Phycitinae
- Genus: Oedilepia; Hampson, 1930
- Species: O. striginervella

Binomial name
- Oedilepia striginervella (Hampson, 1903)

Synonyms
- Nephopterix striginervella Hampson, 1903

Genus of moths

Oedilepia is a monotypic snout moth genus described by George Hampson in 1930. Its single species, Oedilepia striginervella, was originally described under the genus Nephopterix by Hampson in 1903. It is found in Sri Lanka.
