= Ciliopempelia =

Scientific classification
- Domain: Eukaryota
- Kingdom: Animalia
- Phylum: Arthropoda
- Class: Insecta
- Order: Lepidoptera
- Family: Pyralidae
- Subfamily: Phycitinae
- Genus: Ciliopempelia; Amsel, 1961
- Species: C. hyrcanella

Binomial name
- Ciliopempelia hyrcanella Amsel, 1961

Genus of moths

Ciliopempelia is a monotypic snout moth genus described by Hans Georg Amsel in 1961. Its only species, Ciliopempelia hyrcanella, described by the same author, is found in Iran.
