= Chrysoscinia =

Scientific classification
- Kingdom: Animalia
- Phylum: Arthropoda
- Class: Insecta
- Order: Lepidoptera
- Family: Pyralidae
- Subfamily: Phycitinae
- Genus: Chrysoscinia; Hampson, 1930
- Species: C. plicata

Binomial name
- Chrysoscinia plicata Hampson, 1930

Genus of moths

Chrysoscinia is a monotypic snout moth genus. Its single species, Chrysoscinia plicata, is found in New Guinea. Both the genus and species were described by George Hampson in 1930.
