= Gnathomorpha =

Scientific classification
- Domain: Eukaryota
- Kingdom: Animalia
- Phylum: Arthropoda
- Class: Insecta
- Order: Lepidoptera
- Family: Pyralidae
- Subfamily: Phycitinae
- Genus: Gnathomorpha; Amsel, 1959
- Species: G. makranella

Binomial name
- Gnathomorpha makranella Amsel, 1959

Genus of moths

Gnathomorpha is a monotypic snout moth genus described by Hans Georg Amsel in 1959. Its single species, Gnathomorpha makranella, described by the same author, is found in Iran.
