= Illatila =

Scientific classification
- Kingdom: Animalia
- Phylum: Arthropoda
- Class: Insecta
- Order: Lepidoptera
- Family: Pyralidae
- Subfamily: Phycitinae
- Genus: Illatila; Dyar, 1914
- Species: I. gurbyris

Binomial name
- Illatila gurbyris Dyar, 1914

Genus of moths

Illatila is a monotypic snout moth genus described by Harrison Gray Dyar Jr. in 1914. It contains the species Illatila gurbyris, which is found in Panama.
