= Ormudzia =

Scientific classification
- Domain: Eukaryota
- Kingdom: Animalia
- Phylum: Arthropoda
- Class: Insecta
- Order: Lepidoptera
- Family: Pyralidae
- Subfamily: Phycitinae
- Genus: Ormudzia; Amsel, 1954
- Species: O. cameratella

Binomial name
- Ormudzia cameratella Amsel, 1954

Synonyms
- Ormuzdia Amsel, 1954

Genus of moths

Ormudzia is a monotypic snout moth genus described by Hans Georg Amsel in 1954. Its only species, Ormudzia cameratella, described by the same author, is found in Iran.
