= Caustella =

Scientific classification
- Kingdom: Animalia
- Phylum: Arthropoda
- Class: Insecta
- Order: Lepidoptera
- Family: Pyralidae
- Subfamily: Phycitinae
- Genus: Caustella; Hampson, 1930
- Species: C. micralis

Binomial name
- Caustella micralis (Hampson, 1896)

Synonyms
- Heterographis micralis Hampson, 1896

Genus of moths

Caustella is a monotypic snout moth genus in the family Pyralidae described by George Hampson in 1930. Its only species, Caustella micralis, was described by the same author in 1896. It is found in Sri Lanka.
