= Eurhophaea =

Scientific classification
- Domain: Eukaryota
- Kingdom: Animalia
- Phylum: Arthropoda
- Class: Insecta
- Order: Lepidoptera
- Family: Pyralidae
- Genus: Eurhophaea; Amsel, 1961
- Species: E. hyrcanella

Binomial name
- Eurhophaea hyrcanella (Amsel, 1954)

Synonyms
- Eurhodope hyrcanella Amsel, 1954

Genus of moths

Eurhophaea is a monotypic snout moth genus described by Hans Georg Amsel in 1961. Its only species, Eurhophaea hyrcanella, is found in Iran.

== Taxonomy ==
The species was described as a subspecies of Eurhodope flavella. It was later raised to specific rank.
