= Neorufalda =

Scientific classification
- Domain: Eukaryota
- Kingdom: Animalia
- Phylum: Arthropoda
- Class: Insecta
- Order: Lepidoptera
- Family: Pyralidae
- Subfamily: Phycitinae
- Genus: Neorufalda; Yamanaka, 1986
- Species: N. pullella

Binomial name
- Neorufalda pullella Yamanaka, 1986

Genus of moths

Neorufalda, is a monotypic snout moth genus described by Hiroshi Yamanaka in 1986. Its single species, Neorufalda pullella, described in the same article, is found in Japan.
