= Drescoma =

Scientific classification
- Domain: Eukaryota
- Kingdom: Animalia
- Phylum: Arthropoda
- Class: Insecta
- Order: Lepidoptera
- Family: Pyralidae
- Subfamily: Phycitinae
- Genus: Drescoma; Dyar, 1914

Genus of moths

Drescoma is a genus of snout moths. It was described by Harrison Gray Dyar Jr. in 1914 and is known from Panama.

== Species ==
- Drescoma cinilixa Dyar, 1914
- Drescoma cyrdipsa Dyar, 1914
