= Gabinius paulsoni =

Scientific classification
- Kingdom: Animalia
- Phylum: Arthropoda
- Clade: Pancrustacea
- Class: Insecta
- Order: Lepidoptera
- Family: Pyralidae
- Subfamily: Phycitinae
- Genus: Gabinius; Heinrich, 1956
- Species: G. paulsoni

Binomial name
- Gabinius paulsoni (Ragonot, 1888)

Synonyms
- Promylea paulsoni Ragonot, 1888

Species of moth

Gabinius is a monotypic snout moth genus described by Carl Heinrich in 1956. Its only species, Gabinius paulsoni, described by Émile Louis Ragonot in 1888, is found in Chile.

The wingspan is 20–23 mm. The ground color of the forewings is olivaceous gray, strongly tinted with vinous brown in the dorsal area. The hindwings are translucent, yellowish white with a smoky tint towards the apex and along the terminal margin.
