= Nefundella =

Scientific classification
- Kingdom: Animalia
- Phylum: Arthropoda
- Class: Insecta
- Order: Lepidoptera
- Family: Pyralidae
- Tribe: Phycitini
- Genus: Nefundella; Neunzig, 1986

Genus of moths

Nefundella is a genus of snout moths. It was described by Herbert H. Neunzig in 1986.

== Species ==
- Nefundella dentata
- Nefundella distractor
- Nefundella tolerata
- Nefundella xalapensis
