= Adelperga cordubensiella =

Scientific classification
- Kingdom: Animalia
- Phylum: Arthropoda
- Clade: Pancrustacea
- Class: Insecta
- Order: Lepidoptera
- Family: Pyralidae
- Subfamily: Phycitinae
- Genus: Adelperga; Heinrich, 1956
- Species: A. cordubensiella

Binomial name
- Adelperga cordubensiella (Ragonot, 1888)

Synonyms
- Heterographis cordubensiella Ragonot, 1888

Species of moth

Adelperga is a monotypic snout moth genus in the subfamily Phycitinae. It was described by Carl Heinrich in 1956. It contains the species Adelperga cordubensiella, which was originally described as Heterographis cordubensiella by Émile Louis Ragonot in 1888. It is known from Argentina.
