= Belutchistania =

Scientific classification
- Domain: Eukaryota
- Kingdom: Animalia
- Phylum: Arthropoda
- Class: Insecta
- Order: Lepidoptera
- Family: Pyralidae
- Subfamily: Phycitinae
- Genus: Belutchistania; Amsel, 1951
- Species: B. squamalis

Binomial name
- Belutchistania squamalis Amsel, 1951

Synonyms
- Belutschistania Amsel, 1951

Genus of moths

Belutchistania is a monotypic snout moth genus described by Hans Georg Amsel in 1951. Its single species, Belutchistania squamalis, was described by the same author. It is found in Iran and the United Arab Emirates.
