= Africella =

Scientific classification
- Kingdom: Animalia
- Phylum: Arthropoda
- Clade: Pancrustacea
- Class: Insecta
- Order: Lepidoptera
- Family: Pyralidae
- Subfamily: Phycitinae
- Genus: Africella; Hampson, 1930
- Species: A. micraeola

Binomial name
- Africella micraeola Hampson, 1930

Genus of moths

Africella is a genus of snout moths. It was described by George Hampson in 1930 and contains the species Africella micraeola. It is found in Ghana.
