= Megalophycita =

Scientific classification
- Domain: Eukaryota
- Kingdom: Animalia
- Phylum: Arthropoda
- Class: Insecta
- Order: Lepidoptera
- Family: Pyralidae
- Subfamily: Phycitinae
- Genus: Megalophycita; Amsel, 1953
- Species: M. albicostella

Binomial name
- Megalophycita albicostella Amsel, 1953

Genus of moths

Megalophycita is a monotypic snout moth genus that was described by Hans Georg Amsel in 1953. Its single species, Megalophycita albicostella, which was described by the same author, is found in Mauritania.
