= Nylonala =

Scientific classification
- Kingdom: Animalia
- Phylum: Arthropoda
- Clade: Pancrustacea
- Class: Insecta
- Order: Lepidoptera
- Family: Pyralidae
- Subfamily: Phycitinae
- Genus: Nylonala; Gozmány, 1960
- Species: N. infidelis

Binomial name
- Nylonala infidelis Gozmány, 1960

Genus of moths

Nylonala is a monotypic snout moth genus described by László Anthony Gozmány in 1960. Its only species, Nylonala infidelis, described in the same article, is found in Egypt.
