= Mimopolyocha =

Scientific classification
- Domain: Eukaryota
- Kingdom: Animalia
- Phylum: Arthropoda
- Class: Insecta
- Order: Lepidoptera
- Family: Pyralidae
- Subfamily: Phycitinae
- Genus: Mimopolyocha; Matsumura, 1925
- Species: M. obscurella

Binomial name
- Mimopolyocha obscurella Matsumura, 1911

Synonyms
- Genus: Mimopolyoha Matsumura, 1925; Species: Platytes obscurella Matsumura, 1911

Genus of moths

Mimopolyocha is a monotypic snout moth genus described by Shōnen Matsumura in 1925. Its only species, Mimopolyocha obscurella, had been described by the same author in 1911. It is found in Russia.
