= Cosmethella =

Scientific classification
- Domain: Eukaryota
- Kingdom: Animalia
- Phylum: Arthropoda
- Class: Insecta
- Order: Lepidoptera
- Family: Pyralidae
- Genus: Cosmethella; Munroe & M. Shaffer, 1980

Genus of moths

Cosmethella is a genus of snout moths. It was described by Eugene G. Munroe and M. Shaffer in 1980.

== Species ==
- Cosmethella major Munroe & Shaffer, 1980
- Cosmethella minor Munroe & Shaffer, 1980
- Cosmethella unipectinalis (Hampson, 1906)
