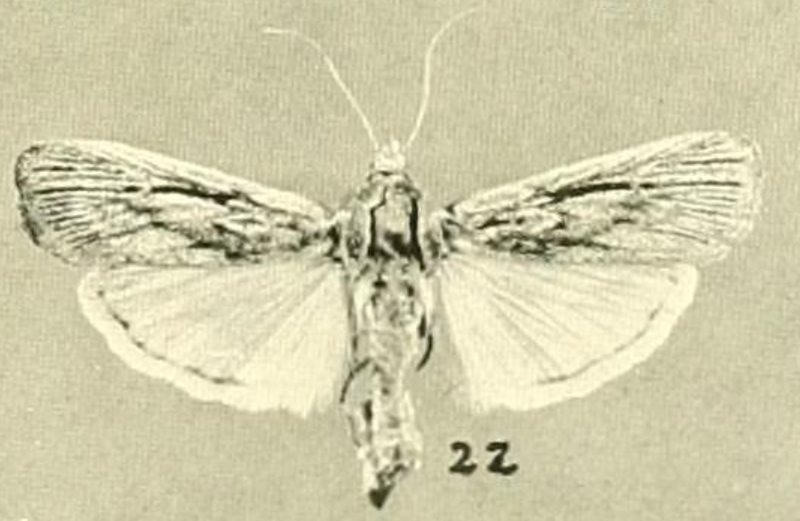
- Female

Scientific classification
- Domain: Eukaryota
- Kingdom: Animalia
- Phylum: Arthropoda
- Class: Insecta
- Order: Lepidoptera
- Family: Pyralidae
- Subfamily: Phycitinae
- Genus: Cahela; Heinrich, 1939
- Species: C. ponderosella

Binomial name
- Cahela ponderosella (Barnes & McDunnough, 1918)

Synonyms
- Olyca ponderosella Barnes & McDunnough, 1918; Cactobrosis interstitialis Dyar, 1925; Cactobrosis pheonicis Dyar, 1925; Zophodia purgatoria Dyar, 1925; Cactobrosis (?) ponderosella Dyar, 1928

= Cahela =

Genus of moths

Cahela is a monotypic snout moth genus described by Carl Heinrich in 1939. Its only species, Cahela ponderosella, the cahela moth, described by William Barnes and James Halliday McDunnough in 1918, is found in Mexico and in the US states of California, Texas, Arizona, Utah and probably Nevada.

Adults are on wing from March to June.

The larvae feed on the stems of Cylindropuntia species.
