= Nevacolima =

Scientific classification
- Domain: Eukaryota
- Kingdom: Animalia
- Phylum: Arthropoda
- Class: Insecta
- Order: Lepidoptera
- Family: Pyralidae
- Genus: Nevacolima; Neunzig, 1994

Genus of moths

Nevacolima is a genus of snout moths. It was described by Herbert H. Neunzig in 1994.

== Species ==
- Nevacolima jaliscoensis
- Nevacolima zodia
