= Selagiaforma =

Scientific classification
- Domain: Eukaryota
- Kingdom: Animalia
- Phylum: Arthropoda
- Class: Insecta
- Order: Lepidoptera
- Family: Pyralidae
- Subfamily: Phycitinae
- Genus: Selagiaforma; Roesler, 1982
- Species: S. sandrangatoella

Binomial name
- Selagiaforma sandrangatoella Roesler, 1982

Genus of moths

Selagiaforma is a monotypic moth genus of the family Pyralidae described by Rolf-Ulrich Roesler in 1982. Its only species, Selagiaforma sandrangatoella, was described by the same author in the same year.
