= Coleocornutia =

Scientific classification
- Domain: Eukaryota
- Kingdom: Animalia
- Phylum: Arthropoda
- Class: Insecta
- Order: Lepidoptera
- Family: Pyralidae
- Subfamily: Phycitinae
- Genus: Coleocornutia; Amsel, 1961
- Species: C. shirazella

Binomial name
- Coleocornutia shirazella Amsel, 1961

Genus of moths

Coleocornutia is a monotypic snout moth genus described by Hans Georg Amsel in 1961. Its single species, Coleocornutia shirazella, described by the same author, is found in Iran.
