= Melanastia =

Scientific classification
- Kingdom: Animalia
- Phylum: Arthropoda
- Class: Insecta
- Order: Lepidoptera
- Family: Pyralidae
- Subfamily: Phycitinae
- Genus: Melanastia; Hampson, 1930
- Species: M. bicolor

Binomial name
- Melanastia bicolor Hampson, 1930

Synonyms
- Melanistia Whalley, 1970

Genus of moths

Melanastia is a monotypic snout moth genus described by George Hampson in 1930. Its only species, Melanastia bicolor, described in the same article, is found in Nigeria and South Africa.
