= Moerbes =

Scientific classification
- Kingdom: Animalia
- Phylum: Arthropoda
- Class: Insecta
- Order: Lepidoptera
- Family: Pyralidae
- Subfamily: Phycitinae
- Genus: Moerbes; Dyar, 1914
- Species: M. dryopella

Binomial name
- Moerbes dryopella (Schaus, 1913)

Synonyms
- Zophodia dryopella Schaus, 1913

Genus of moths

Moerbes is a monotypic snout moth genus described by Harrison Gray Dyar Jr. in 1914. Its single species, Moerbes dryopella, was described by William Schaus in 1913, originally as Zophodia dryopella. It was subsequently moved under the genus Moerbes by Dyar. It is found in Panama.
