= Cayennia =

Scientific classification
- Kingdom: Animalia
- Phylum: Arthropoda
- Class: Insecta
- Order: Lepidoptera
- Family: Pyralidae
- Subfamily: Phycitinae
- Genus: Cayennia; Hampson, 1930
- Species: C. rufitinctalis

Binomial name
- Cayennia rufitinctalis Hampson, 1930

Genus of moths

Cayennia is a monotypic snout moth genus described by George Hampson in 1930. Its only species, Cayennia rufitinctalis, described by the same author in the same year, is found in French Guiana.
