= Auchmera =

Scientific classification
- Kingdom: Animalia
- Phylum: Arthropoda
- Class: Insecta
- Order: Lepidoptera
- Family: Pyralidae
- Subfamily: Phycitinae
- Genus: Auchmera; Hampson, 1930
- Species: A. falsalis

Binomial name
- Auchmera falsalis (Hampson, 1908)

Synonyms
- Heterographis falsalis Hampson, 1908

Genus of moths

Auchmera is a monotypic snout moth genus described by George Hampson in 1930. Its single species, Auchmera falsalis, was described by the same author in 1908. It is found in India.
