= Crystallozyga =

Scientific classification
- Kingdom: Animalia
- Phylum: Arthropoda
- Class: Insecta
- Order: Lepidoptera
- Family: Pyralidae
- Subfamily: Phycitinae
- Genus: Crystallozyga; Meyrick, 1937
- Species: C. alicia

Binomial name
- Crystallozyga alicia Meyrick, 1937

Genus of moths

Crystallozyga is a monotypic snout moth genus. Its only species, Crystallozyga alicia, is found in the Democratic Republic of the Congo. Both the genus and species were first described by Edward Meyrick in 1937.
