= Paconius =

Scientific classification
- Domain: Eukaryota
- Kingdom: Animalia
- Phylum: Arthropoda
- Class: Insecta
- Order: Lepidoptera
- Family: Pyralidae
- Subfamily: Phycitinae
- Genus: Paconius; Heinrich, 1956
- Species: P. corniculatus

Binomial name
- Paconius corniculatus Heinrich, 1956

Genus of moths

Paconius is a monotypic snout moth genus described by Carl Heinrich in 1956. Its only species, Paconius corniculatus, described in the same article, is found in the US territory of Puerto Rico.
