= Rambutaneia =

Scientific classification
- Domain: Eukaryota
- Kingdom: Animalia
- Phylum: Arthropoda
- Class: Insecta
- Order: Lepidoptera
- Family: Pyralidae
- Subfamily: Phycitinae
- Genus: Rambutaneia; Roesler & Küppers, 1979
- Species: R. udjana

Binomial name
- Rambutaneia udjana Roesler & Küppers, 1979

Genus of moths

Rambutaneia is a monotypic moth genus in the family Pyralidae. Its only species, Rambutaneia udjana, is found in Indonesia. Both the genus and the family were first described by Rolf-Ulrich Roesler and Peter Victor Küppers in 1979.
