= Actinocrates =

Scientific classification
- Kingdom: Animalia
- Phylum: Arthropoda
- Clade: Pancrustacea
- Class: Insecta
- Order: Lepidoptera
- Family: Pyralidae
- Subfamily: Phycitinae
- Genus: Actinocrates; Meyrick, 1934
- Species: A. euryniphas

Binomial name
- Actinocrates euryniphas Meyrick, 1934

Genus of moths

Actinocrates is a monotypic snout moth genus in the subfamily Phycitinae. Its only species, Actinocrates euryniphas, is known from Fiji. Both the genus and species were first described by Edward Meyrick in 1934.
