= Ereboenis =

Scientific classification
- Kingdom: Animalia
- Phylum: Arthropoda
- Class: Insecta
- Order: Lepidoptera
- Family: Pyralidae
- Subfamily: Phycitinae
- Genus: Ereboenis; Meyrick, 1935
- Species: E. saturata

Binomial name
- Ereboenis saturata Meyrick, 1935

Genus of moths

Ereboenis is a monotypic snout moth genus. Its only species, Ereboenis saturata, is found in southern India. Both the genus and species were first described by Edward Meyrick in 1935.

The larvae are a pest of tea.
