= Autocyrota =

Scientific classification
- Kingdom: Animalia
- Phylum: Arthropoda
- Clade: Pancrustacea
- Class: Insecta
- Order: Lepidoptera
- Family: Pyralidae
- Subfamily: Phycitinae
- Genus: Autocyrota; Meyrick, 1933
- Species: A. diacma

Binomial name
- Autocyrota diacma Meyrick, 1933

Genus of insects

Autocyrota is a monotypic snout moth genus. Its only species, Autocyrota diacma, is found in the Republic of the Congo. Both the genus and the species were first described by Edward Meyrick in 1933.
