= Dialepta =

Scientific classification
- Domain: Eukaryota
- Kingdom: Animalia
- Phylum: Arthropoda
- Class: Insecta
- Order: Lepidoptera
- Family: Pyralidae
- Subfamily: Phycitinae
- Genus: Dialepta; Turner, 1913
- Species: D. micropolia

Binomial name
- Dialepta micropolia Turner, 1913

Genus of moths

Dialepta is a monotypic snout moth genus described by Alfred Jefferis Turner in 1913. Its only species, Dialepta micropolia, described by the same author, is found in Australia.
