= Idiobrotis =

Scientific classification
- Kingdom: Animalia
- Phylum: Arthropoda
- Class: Insecta
- Order: Lepidoptera
- Family: Pyralidae
- Subfamily: Phycitinae
- Genus: Idiobrotis; Meyrick, 1937
- Species: I. oxygrapha

Binomial name
- Idiobrotis oxygrapha Meyrick, 1937

Genus of moths

Idiobrotis is a monotypic snout moth genus (family Pyralidae). Its only species, Idiobrotis oxygrapha, is found in India. Both the genus and species were first described by Edward Meyrick in 1937.
