= Amphithrix =

Scientific classification
- Domain: Eukaryota
- Kingdom: Animalia
- Phylum: Arthropoda
- Class: Insecta
- Order: Lepidoptera
- Family: Pyralidae
- Tribe: Phycitini
- Genus: Amphithrix; Ragonot, 1893
- Species: A. sublineatella

Binomial name
- Amphithrix sublineatella (Staudinger, 1859)

Synonyms
- Genus: Horistarcha Meyrick, 1935; Species: Nephopteryx sublineatella Staudinger, 1859; Horistarcha ogmosema Meyrick, 1935

Species of moth

Amphithrix is a genus of snout moths. It was described by Ragonot, in 1893, and contains one species, Amphithrix sublineatella. It is found in Spain, Portugal, France, Corsica, Sicily and Croatia.

The wingspan is 18–24 mm.
