= Nicetiodes =

Scientific classification
- Domain: Eukaryota
- Kingdom: Animalia
- Phylum: Arthropoda
- Class: Insecta
- Order: Lepidoptera
- Family: Pyralidae
- Subfamily: Phycitinae
- Genus: Nicetiodes; Schaus, 1923
- Species: N. apianella

Binomial name
- Nicetiodes apianella Schaus, 1923

Genus of moths

Nicetiodes is a monotypic snout moth genus described by William Schaus in 1923. Its only species, Nicetiodes apianella, described in the same article, is found on the Galápagos Islands.
