= Microphycita =

Scientific classification
- Domain: Eukaryota
- Kingdom: Animalia
- Phylum: Arthropoda
- Class: Insecta
- Order: Lepidoptera
- Family: Pyralidae
- Subfamily: Phycitinae
- Genus: Microphycita; Dyar, 1914
- Species: M. titillella

Binomial name
- Microphycita titillella Dyar, 1914

Single-species genus of moths

Microphycita titillella is a species of snout moth in the monotypic genus Microphycita. The species and the genus were described by Harrison Gray Dyar Jr. in 1914. It is found in Panama.
