= Borosia =

Scientific classification
- Kingdom: Animalia
- Phylum: Arthropoda
- Clade: Pancrustacea
- Class: Insecta
- Order: Lepidoptera
- Family: Pyralidae
- Subfamily: Phycitinae
- Genus: Borosia; Gozmány, 1959
- Species: B. aegyptiaca

Binomial name
- Borosia aegyptiaca Gozmány, 1959

Genus of moths

Borosia is a monotypic snout moth genus described by László Anthony Gozmány in 1959. Its only species, Borosia aegyptiaca, described by the same author in the same year, is found in Egypt.
