= Chilocremastis =

Scientific classification
- Kingdom: Animalia
- Phylum: Arthropoda
- Class: Insecta
- Order: Lepidoptera
- Family: Pyralidae
- Subfamily: Phycitinae
- Genus: Chilocremastis; Meyrick, 1934
- Species: C. castanias

Binomial name
- Chilocremastis castanias Meyrick, 1934

Genus of moths

Chilocremastis is a monotypic snout moth genus. Its only species, Chilocremastis castanias, is found in the Congo Basin. Both the genus and species were first described by Edward Meyrick in 1934.
