= Alispoides =

Scientific classification
- Kingdom: Animalia
- Phylum: Arthropoda
- Clade: Pancrustacea
- Class: Insecta
- Order: Lepidoptera
- Family: Pyralidae
- Subfamily: Phycitinae
- Genus: Alispoides; Ragonot, 1888
- Species: A. vermiculella

Binomial name
- Alispoides vermiculella Ragonot, 1888

Genus of moths

Alispoides is a genus of snout moths. It was described by Ragonot, in 1888, and contains the species Alispoides vermiculella. It is found in southern Africa.
