= Makrania =

Scientific classification
- Kingdom: Animalia
- Phylum: Arthropoda
- Clade: Pancrustacea
- Class: Insecta
- Order: Lepidoptera
- Family: Pyralidae
- Subfamily: Phycitinae
- Genus: Makrania; Amsel, 1959
- Species: M. belutschistanella

Binomial name
- Makrania belutschistanella Amsel, 1959

Species of insect

Makrania is a monotypic genus of snout moth described by Hans Georg Amsel in 1959. Its sole species, Makrania belutschistanella, also described by the same author, originates from Iran.
