= Ancova (moth) =

Scientific classification
- Kingdom: Animalia
- Phylum: Arthropoda
- Class: Insecta
- Order: Lepidoptera
- Family: Pyralidae
- Subfamily: Phycitinae
- Genus: Ancova; Ragonot, 1893
- Species: A. meridionalis

Binomial name
- Ancova meridionalis (Walker, 1863)

Synonyms
- Nephopterix meridionalis Walker, 1863

Genus of moths

Ancova is a genus of snout moths. It was described by Ragonot, in 1893, and contains the species A. meridionalis. It is found in India.
