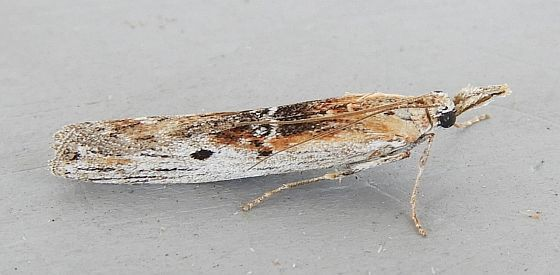

Scientific classification
- Domain: Eukaryota
- Kingdom: Animalia
- Phylum: Arthropoda
- Class: Insecta
- Order: Lepidoptera
- Family: Pyralidae
- Subfamily: Phycitinae
- Genus: Patriciola; Heinrich, 1956
- Species: P. semicana

Binomial name
- Patriciola semicana Heinrich, 1956

Synonyms
- Patricola Whalley, 1970 (misspelling)

= Patriciola =

Genus of moths

Paticiola is a monotypic snout moth genus in the subfamily Phycitinae described by Carl Heinrich in 1956. Its only species, Patriciola semicana, was described by the same author in the same year. It is known from North America, including Utah.

The wingspan is 25–26 millimetres (0.98–1.02 in).
