= Aprophthasia =

Scientific classification
- Domain: Eukaryota
- Kingdom: Animalia
- Phylum: Arthropoda
- Class: Insecta
- Order: Lepidoptera
- Family: Pyralidae
- Subfamily: Phycitinae
- Genus: Aprophthasia; Amsel, 1968
- Species: A. vartianae

Binomial name
- Aprophthasia vartianae Amsel, 1968

Genus of moths

Aprophthasia is a monotypic snout moth genus described by Hans Georg Amsel in 1968. It contains the species Aprophthasia vartianae, described by the same author. It is found in Pakistan.
