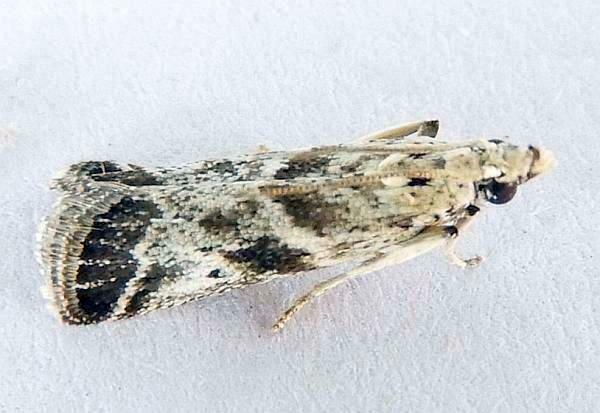

Scientific classification
- Domain: Eukaryota
- Kingdom: Animalia
- Phylum: Arthropoda
- Class: Insecta
- Order: Lepidoptera
- Family: Pyralidae
- Subfamily: Phycitinae
- Genus: Diviana; Ragonot, 1888
- Species: D. eudoreella

Binomial name
- Diviana eudoreella Ragonot, 1888

Synonyms
- Dannemora edentella Hulst, 1890

= Diviana =

Genus of moths

Diviana is a genus of snout moths. It was described by Ragonot in 1888, and contains the species D. eudoreella. It is found in the southern United States.
