= Cacozophera =

Scientific classification
- Kingdom: Animalia
- Phylum: Arthropoda
- Class: Insecta
- Order: Lepidoptera
- Family: Pyralidae
- Subfamily: Phycitinae
- Genus: Cacozophera; Dyar, 1919
- Species: C. venosa

Binomial name
- Cacozophera venosa Dyar, 1919

Genus of moths

Cacozophera is a monotypic snout moth genus described by Harrison Gray Dyar Jr. in 1919. It contains the species Cacozophera venosa described by the same author. It is found in Guatemala.

The wingspan is about 19 mm. The forewings are brownish fuscous and the hindwings are smoky fuscous, although the veins and terminal margin are darker.
