= Farsia pallorella =

Scientific classification
- Kingdom: Animalia
- Phylum: Arthropoda
- Clade: Pancrustacea
- Class: Insecta
- Order: Lepidoptera
- Family: Pyralidae
- Subfamily: Phycitinae
- Genus: Farsia; Amsel, 1961
- Species: F. pallorella

Binomial name
- Farsia pallorella Amsel, 1961

Species of moth

Farsia is a monotypic snout moth genus described by Hans Georg Amsel in 1961. Its only species, Farsia pallorella, described by the same author, is found in Iran.
