= Laciempista =

Scientific classification
- Domain: Eukaryota
- Kingdom: Animalia
- Phylum: Arthropoda
- Class: Insecta
- Order: Lepidoptera
- Family: Pyralidae
- Subfamily: Phycitinae
- Genus: Laciempista; Roesler, 1975
- Species: L. amseli

Binomial name
- Laciempista amseli Roesler, 1975

Genus of moths

Laciempista is a genus of snout moths. It was described by Roesler in 1975, and contains the species L. amseli. It is found in China.
