= Anisothrix =

Anisothrix may refer to:

- Anisothrix (moth), a genus of insects in the family Pyralidae
- Anisothrix (plant), a genus of plants in the family Asteraceae
