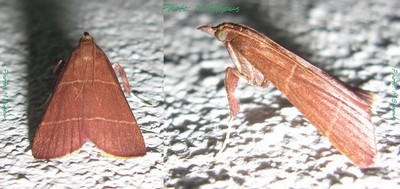
- Parachma lequettealis

Scientific classification
- Kingdom: Animalia
- Phylum: Arthropoda
- Clade: Pancrustacea
- Class: Insecta
- Order: Lepidoptera
- Family: Pyralidae
- Subfamily: Chrysauginae; Lederer, 1863

Type species
- Chrysauge divida Hübner, 1823

Diversity
- 135 genera

Synonyms
- Bradypodicolinae Spuler, 1906; Semniidae Lederer, 1863

= Chrysauginae =

Subfamily of moths

The Chrysauginae are a subfamily of snout moths (family Pyralidae). They are primarily Neotropical and include about 400 described species.

== Description and ecology ==
The subfamily includes the sloth moths (genera Cryptoses, Bradypodicola and Bradypophila). The caterpillar larvae of these species feed on the dung of sloths, and adults live in the sloths' fur. Other unusual Chrysauginae caterpillars have been found in Hymenoptera nests and on the spines of caterpillars of the saturniid moth genus Automeris. However, their larvae usually feed on plants, boring into seed, fruits, stems and roots, or rolling and spinning leaves together to form a hideout.

While the adults are fairly undistinguished, Chrysauginae larvae can usually be recognized unequivocally by the sclerotised ring around seta SD1 of the metathorax.

== Systematics ==
In 1995, Solis et al. compiled a checklist of Chrysauginae for the Western Hemisphere. However, phylogenetic analyses have not been conducted. Shaffer et al. tentatively placed four Australian genera in the subfamily in 1996; research on the adults failed to support this, and larvae are unknown.

- Abaera Walker, 1859
- Acallidia Schaus, 1913
- Acallis Ragonot, 1891
- Acutia Ragonot, 1891
- Adenopteryx Ragonot, 1891
- Ahyalosticta Amsel, 1956
- Anassodes Turner, 1932
- Anemosa Walker, 1859 (= Drymiarcha Meyrick, 1885)
- Anemosella Dyar, 1914 (= Balidarcha Dyar, 1914)
- Anisothrix Ragonot, 1891
- Arbinia Möschler, 1881
- Area Ragonot, 1891
- Arouva Walker, 1864
- Arta Grote, 1875 (= Xantippides Dyar, 1908)
- Azamora Walker, 1858 (= Amblyura Lederer, 1863, Arica Walker, 1863, Thylacophora Ragonot, 1891, Torda Walker, 1863)
- Basacallis Cashatt, 1969
- Bisinusia Amsel, 1956
- Blepharocerus C. É. Blanchard, 1852 (= Blepharocorus C. É. Blanchard, 1852)
- Bonchis Walker, 1862 (= Ethnistis Lederer, 1863, Gazaca Walker, 1866, Vurna Walker, 1866, Zarania Walker, 1866)
- Bradypodicola Spuler, 1906
- Bradypophila Ihering, 1914
- Callasopia Möschler, 1890
- Caphys Walker, 1863 (= Euexippe Ragonot, 1891, Ugra Walker, 1863)
- Cappsia Pastrana, 1953
- Carcha Walker, 1859 (= Coeloma Möschler, 1890)
- Casuaria Walker, 1866 (= Saccopleura Ragonot, 1891)
- Catadupa Walker, 1863
- Chenevadia Dyar, 1914
- Chrysauge Hübner, 1823 (= Candisa Walker, 1866)
- Chrysophila Hübner, 1831 (= Eurypta Lederer, 1863)
- Clydonopteron N. D. Riley, 1880
- Condylolomia Grote, 1873 (= Cordylolomia Rye, 1875)
- Craftsia Dyar, 1914
- Cromarcha Dyar, 1914
- Cryptoses Dyar, 1908
- Cyclidalis Hampson, 1906
- Cyclopalpia Hampson, 1897
- Dastira Walker, 1859
- Dasycnemia Ragonot, 1891 (= Hyalosticta Hampson, 1897, Potosa Capps, 1952)
- Deopteryx Dyar, 1914
- Derbeta Walker, 1866
- Diloxis Hampson, 1897
- Distortia Amsel, 1956
- Drepanodia Ragonot, 1892
- Eobrena Dyar, 1914
- Epidelia Ragonot, 1891
- Epiparachma Amsel, 1956
- Epitamyra Ragonot, 1891
- Erioptycha Ragonot, 1891
- Eupilocera Dognin, 1909
- Galasa Walker, 1866 (= Cordylopeza Zeller, 1873)
- Galasodes Amsel, 1956
- Gephyra Walker, 1859 (= Replicia Dyar, 1914)
- Gephyrella Dyar, 1914
- Hednotodes Lower, 1893 (= Calliphlycta Hampson, 1918)
- Heliades Ragonot, 1891
- Heterauge Hampson, 1906
- Holoperas Warren, 1891
- Humiphila Becker, 1974
- Hyperparachma Warren, 1891 (= Parachmopsis Amsel, 1956)
- Hypocosmia Ragonot, 1891
- Idnea Herrich-Schäffer, 1858 (= Auchoteles Zeller, 1877, Corybissa Walker, 1863, Uzeda Walker, 1863)
- Idneodes Ragonot, 1892
- Itambe Ragonot, 1892
- Lepidomys Guenée, 1852 (= Chalinitis Ragonot, 1891)
- Lophopleura Ragonot, 1891
- Lophopleuropsis Amsel, 1956
- Martiniodes Amsel, 1956
- Megacaphys Hampson, 1916
- Michaelshaffera Solis, 1998
- Microrca Amsel, 1956
- Microsauge Amsel, 1956
- Microzancla Hampson, 1897
- Mimetauge Munroe, 1970
- Monoloxis Hampson, 1897
- Murgisca Walker, 1863 (= Pachymorphus Möschler, 1890)
- Myolisa Dyar, 1914
- Nachaba Walker, 1859 (= Ascha Walker, 1864)
- Navura Schaus, 1913
- Negalasa Barnes & McDunnough, 1913
- Neocaphys Amsel, 1956
- Ocoba Dyar, 1914
- Ocresia Ragonot, 1891
- Oectoperodes Ragonot, 1892
- Oedmatodes Ragonot, 1892 (= Oedematodes Hampson, 1897)
- Ophias Ragonot, 1891
- Oryctopleura Ragonot, 1891
- Pachypalpia Hampson, 1895
- Pachypodistes Hampson, 1905 (= Conotambe Dyar, 1914)
- Parachma Walker, 1866 (= Artopsis Dyar, 1908, Perseistis Strand, 1921, Perseis Ragonot, 1891, Zazaca Walker, 1866)
- Paragalasa Cashatt, 1969
- Paramacna Warren, 1889 (= Acroppterygella Strand, 1917, Acropterygella Neave, 1939, Acropteryx Ragonot, 1891)
- Parasopia Möschler, 1890
- Paridnea Ragonot, 1892 (= Batia Walker, 1867)
- Passelgis Dyar, 1914
- Pelasgis Ragonot, 1891
- Penthesilea Ragonot, 1891
- Pionidia Hampson, 1897
- Plagerepne Tams, 1926
- Polloccia Dyar, 1910 (= Pollocia Neave, 1940)
- Polyterpnes Turner, 1932
- Protrichia Hampson, 1897
- Psectrodes Ragonot, 1891
- Pyrauge Hampson, 1906
- Pyraustodes Ragonot, 1891
- Quadrischistis Amsel, 1956
- Ramphidium Geyer in Hübner, 1837 (= Acrodegmia Ragonot, 1891)
- Rhynchotosale Hampson, 1916
- Rucuma Walker, 1863
- Salobrena Walker, 1863 (= Ballonicha Möschler, 1886, Oectoperia Zeller, 1875, Salobrana Fernald, 1902, Teucronoma Meyrick, 1936)
- Samcova Walker, 1863
- Sanguesa Walker, 1863
- Sarcistis Hampson, 1897
- Satole Dyar, 1908
- Schistoneura Ragonot, 1891
- Semnia Hübner, 1823 (= Acronolepia Westwood, 1835, Episemnia Ragonot, 1891)
- Speosia Schaus, 1913
- Sthenobaea Ragonot, 1891 (= Parabaera Dognin, 1904, Sthenauge Hampson, 1906)
- Streptopalpia Hampson, 1895
- Tamyra Herrich-Schäffer, 1858 (= Lametia Walker, 1859, Tamyrodes Ragonot, 1891)
- Tetraschistis Hampson, 1897
- Tharsanthes Meyrick, 1936
- Thermotesia Hampson, 1916
- Tippecoa Dyar, 1914
- Torotambe Dyar, 1914
- Tosale Walker, 1863 (= Fabatana Walker, 1866, Restidia Dyar, 1914, Siparocera Grote, 1875, Callocera Grote, 1875, Siparocera Robinson, 1876, Uliosoma Warren, 1891)
- Ungulopsis Amsel, 1956
- Voglia Amsel, 1956
- Xantippe Ragonot, 1891
- Zaboba Dyar, 1914
- Zamanna Dyar, 1914
- Zanclodes Ragonot, 1891
