= Craftsia =

Scientific classification
- Kingdom: Animalia
- Phylum: Arthropoda
- Class: Insecta
- Order: Lepidoptera
- Family: Pyralidae
- Subfamily: Chrysauginae
- Genus: Craftsia; Dyar, 1914
- Species: C. vaetta

Binomial name
- Craftsia vaetta Dyar, 1914

Genus of moths

Craftsia is a monotypic snout moth genus. It was described by Harrison Gray Dyar Jr. in 1914, and contains the species Craftsia vaetta. It is found in Panama.
