= Idnea speculans =

Scientific classification
- Domain: Eukaryota
- Kingdom: Animalia
- Phylum: Arthropoda
- Class: Insecta
- Order: Lepidoptera
- Family: Pyralidae
- Genus: Idnea
- Species: I. speculans

Binomial name
- Idnea speculans Herrich-Schäffer, [1858]

Species of insect

Idnea speculans is a species of snout moth in the genus Idnea. It was described by Gottlieb August Wilhelm Herrich-Schäffer in 1858 and is known from Brazil.
