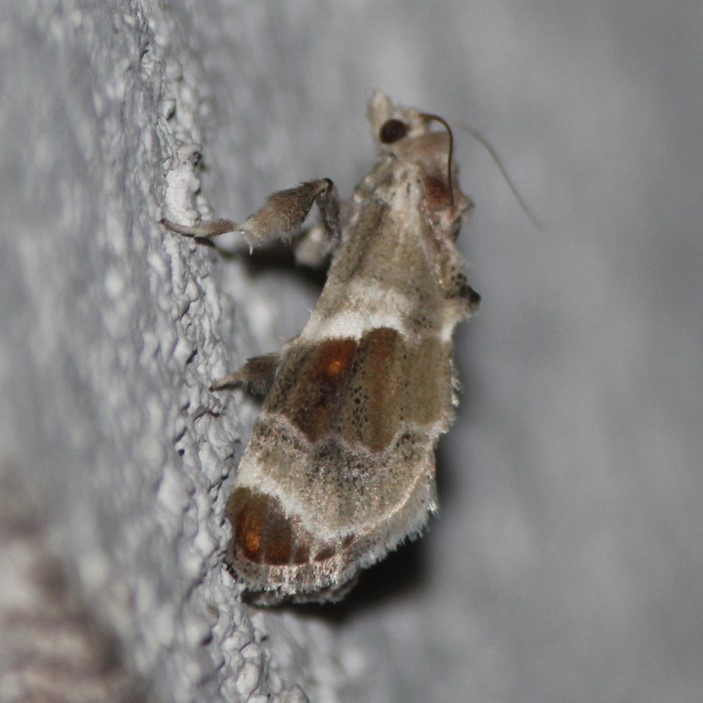

Scientific classification
- Kingdom: Animalia
- Phylum: Arthropoda
- Clade: Pancrustacea
- Class: Insecta
- Order: Lepidoptera
- Family: Pyralidae
- Genus: Cromarcha
- Species: C. stroudagnesia

Binomial name
- Cromarcha stroudagnesia Solis, 2003

= Cromarcha stroudagnesia =

Species of moth

Cromarcha stroudagnesia is a species of snout moth. It was first described by Maria Alma Solis in 2003 and is endemic to Costa Rica.

The length of the forewings is 8–10 millimetres (0.31–0.39 in) for females and 5–9 millimetres (0.20–0.35 in) for males.

The larvae bore in shoots of Tabebuia ochracea and Handroanthus impetiginosus. There is generally only one larva per shoot. Pupation takes place at the base of the tunnel.
