= Hednotodes callichroa =

Scientific classification
- Domain: Eukaryota
- Kingdom: Animalia
- Phylum: Arthropoda
- Class: Insecta
- Order: Lepidoptera
- Family: Pyralidae
- Genus: Hednotodes
- Species: H. callichroa

Binomial name
- Hednotodes callichroa Lower, 1893

Species of moth

Hednotodes callichroa is a species of snout moth in the genus Hednotodes. It was described by Oswald Bertram Lower in 1893 and is known from Australia.
