= Hypocosmia pyrochroma =

Scientific classification
- Kingdom: Animalia
- Phylum: Arthropoda
- Clade: Pancrustacea
- Class: Insecta
- Order: Lepidoptera
- Family: Pyralidae
- Genus: Hypocosmia
- Species: H. pyrochroma

Binomial name
- Hypocosmia pyrochroma (E. D. Jones, 1912)

Synonyms
- Axamora pyrochroma E. D. Jones, 1912

Species of moth

Hypocosmia pyrochroma is a species of snout moth in the genus Hypocosmia. It was described by E. Dukinfield Jones in 1912 and is known from Argentina and Brazil.

This species has also been released in Australia and South Africa for biological control of cat's claw creeper (Dolichandra unguis-cati (L.) L.G.Lohmann).
