= Michaelshaffera =

Scientific classification
- Kingdom: Animalia
- Phylum: Arthropoda
- Clade: Pancrustacea
- Class: Insecta
- Order: Lepidoptera
- Family: Pyralidae
- Subfamily: Chrysauginae
- Genus: Michaelshaffera; Solis, 1998

Genus of moths

Michaelshaffera is a genus of snout moths. It was described by Maria Alma Solis in 1998.

== Species ==
- Michaelshaffera beckeri Solis, 1998
- Michaelshaffera maidoa (Schaus, 1922)
