= Lophopleuropsis =

Scientific classification
- Kingdom: Animalia
- Phylum: Arthropoda
- Class: Insecta
- Order: Lepidoptera
- Family: Pyralidae
- Subfamily: Chrysauginae
- Genus: Lophopleuropsis; Amsel, 1956
- Species: L. flavostrialis

Binomial name
- Lophopleuropsis flavostrialis Amsel, 1956

Genus of moths

Lophopleuropsis is a genus of snout moths. It was described by Hans Georg Amsel in 1956, and contains the species Lophopleuropsis flavostrialis. It is found in Venezuela.
