= Gephyra saturatalis =

Scientific classification
- Kingdom: Animalia
- Phylum: Arthropoda
- Class: Insecta
- Order: Lepidoptera
- Family: Pyralidae
- Genus: Gephyra
- Species: G. saturatalis

Binomial name
- Gephyra saturatalis (Walker, 1859)

Synonyms
- Pyralis saturatalis Walker, 1859; Phalaena farinalis Stoll in Cramer & Stoll, 1781

Species of moth

Gephyra saturatalis is a species of snout moth in the genus Gephyra. It was described by Francis Walker in 1859 and is known from Suriname.
