= Ocresia bisinualis =

Scientific classification
- Domain: Eukaryota
- Kingdom: Animalia
- Phylum: Arthropoda
- Class: Insecta
- Order: Lepidoptera
- Family: Pyralidae
- Genus: Ocresia
- Species: O. bisinualis

Binomial name
- Ocresia bisinualis Ragonot, 1891

Species of moth

Ocresia bisinualis is a species of snout moth, and the type species in the genus Ocresia. It was described by Ragonot in 1891. It is found in Brazil.
