= Pachypodistes sthenistis =

Scientific classification
- Kingdom: Animalia
- Phylum: Arthropoda
- Class: Insecta
- Order: Lepidoptera
- Family: Pyralidae
- Genus: Pachypodistes
- Species: P. sthenistis

Binomial name
- Pachypodistes sthenistis Hampson, 1916

Species of moth

Pachypodistes sthenistis is a species of snout moth in the genus Pachypodistes. It is found in Venezuela.
