= Acutia =

Scientific classification
- Kingdom: Animalia
- Phylum: Arthropoda
- Clade: Pancrustacea
- Class: Insecta
- Order: Lepidoptera
- Family: Pyralidae
- Subfamily: Chrysauginae
- Genus: Acutia; Ragonot, 1891
- Species: A. falciferalis

Binomial name
- Acutia falciferalis Ragonot, 1890

Genus of moths

Acutia is a monotypic moth genus of the family Pyralidae. Its one species is Acutia falciferalis, found in Brazil.
