= Neocaphys =

Scientific classification
- Kingdom: Animalia
- Phylum: Arthropoda
- Class: Insecta
- Order: Lepidoptera
- Family: Pyralidae
- Subfamily: Chrysauginae
- Genus: Neocaphys; Amsel, 1956
- Species: N. purpuralis

Binomial name
- Neocaphys purpuralis Amsel, 1956

Genus of moths

Neocaphys is a monotypic snout moth genus. Its only species, Neocaphys purpuralis, was described by Hans Georg Amsel in 1956. It is found in Venezuela.
