= Ocresia flammealis =

Scientific classification
- Kingdom: Animalia
- Phylum: Arthropoda
- Class: Insecta
- Order: Lepidoptera
- Family: Pyralidae
- Genus: Ocresia
- Species: O. flammealis

Binomial name
- Ocresia flammealis Hampson, 1906

Species of moth

Ocresia flammealis is a species of snout moth in the genus Ocresia. It is found in South America.
