= Pachypodistes paralysisalis =

Scientific classification
- Kingdom: Animalia
- Phylum: Arthropoda
- Class: Insecta
- Order: Lepidoptera
- Family: Pyralidae
- Genus: Pachypodistes
- Species: P. paralysisalis

Binomial name
- Pachypodistes paralysisalis (Dyar, 1914)

Synonyms
- Conotambe paralysisalis Dyar, 1914

Species of moth

Pachypodistes paralysisalis is a species of snout moth in the genus Pachypodistes. It was discovered by Harrison Gray Dyar Jr. in 1914 and is known from Panama.
