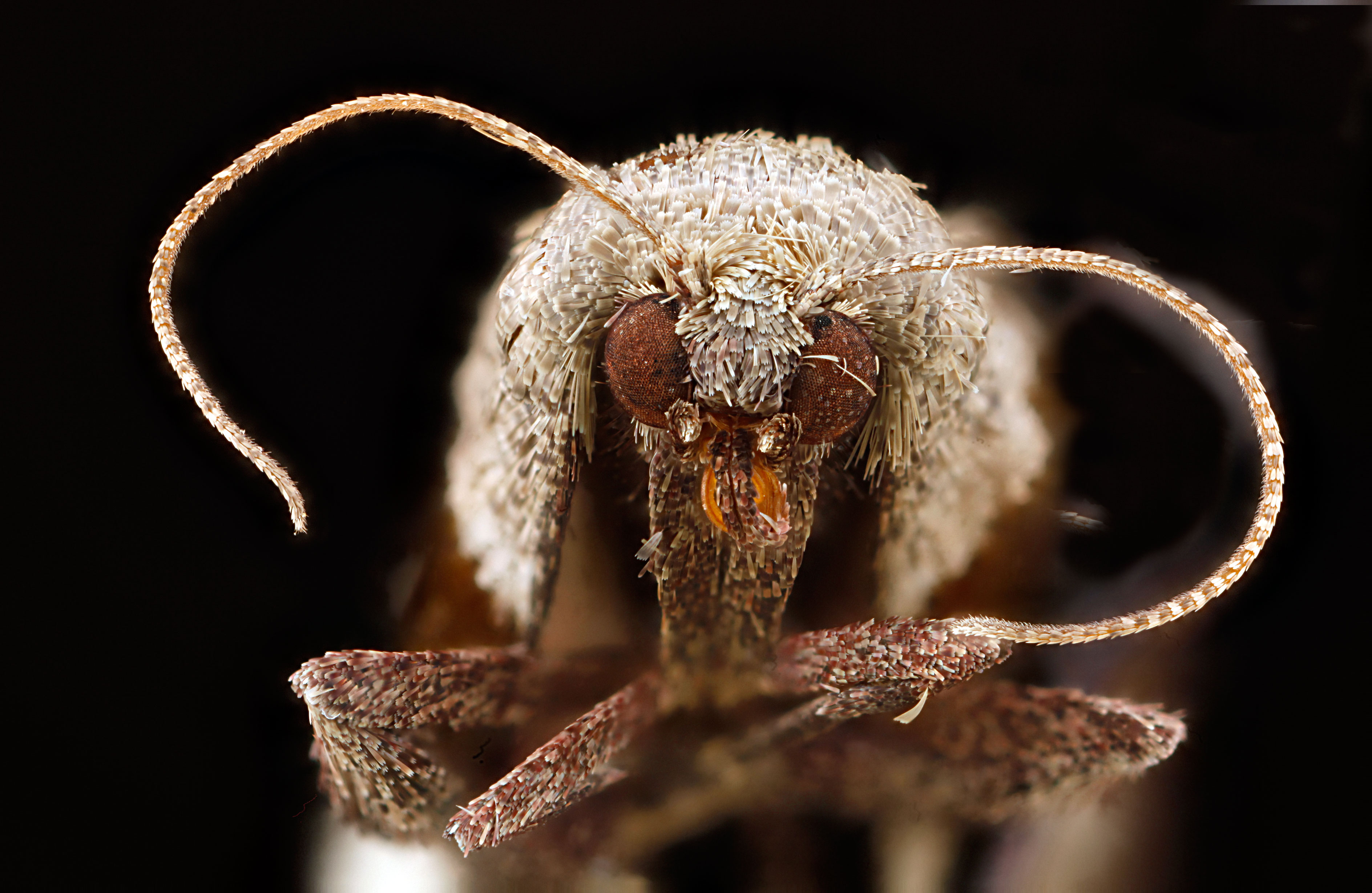
- Tosale oviplagalis (head)

Scientific classification
- Domain: Eukaryota
- Kingdom: Animalia
- Phylum: Arthropoda
- Class: Insecta
- Order: Lepidoptera
- Family: Pyralidae
- Subfamily: Chrysauginae
- Genus: Tosale; Walker, 1863

Synonyms
- Fabatana Walker, 1866; Restidia Dyar, 1914; Siparocera Grote, 1875; Callocera Grote, 1875; Siparocera Robinson, 1876; Uliosoma Warren, 1891

= Tosale =

Genus of moths

Tosale is a genus of snout moths. It was described by Francis Walker in 1859.

== Species ==
- Tosale aucta
- Tosale austa
- Tosale cuprealis (Hampson, 1906)
- Tosale decipiens C. Felder, R. Felder & Rogenhofer, 1875
- Tosale flatalis C. Felder, R. Felder & Rogenhofer, 1875
- Tosale gladbaghiana (Stoll, 1781)
- Tosale grandis
- Tosale lugubris
- Tosale oviplagalis (Walker, 1866)
- Tosale similalis
- Tosale velutina
