= Acallidia =

Scientific classification
- Kingdom: Animalia
- Phylum: Arthropoda
- Clade: Pancrustacea
- Class: Insecta
- Order: Lepidoptera
- Family: Pyralidae
- Subfamily: Chrysauginae
- Genus: Acallidia; Schaus, 1913
- Species: A. dentilinea

Binomial name
- Acallidia dentilinea Schaus, 1913

Genus of moths

Acallidia is a monotypic moth genus of the family Pyralidae. Its one species is Acallidia dentilinea.
