= Anisothrix adustalis =

Scientific classification
- Kingdom: Animalia
- Phylum: Arthropoda
- Class: Insecta
- Order: Lepidoptera
- Family: Pyralidae
- Genus: Anisothrix
- Species: A. adustalis

Binomial name
- Anisothrix adustalis Ragonot, 1891

Species of moth

Anisothrix adustalis is a species of snout moth. It is found in Peru.
