= Ophias =

Scientific classification
- Kingdom: Animalia
- Phylum: Arthropoda
- Class: Insecta
- Order: Lepidoptera
- Family: Pyralidae
- Subfamily: Chrysauginae
- Genus: Ophias; Ragonot, 1891
- Species: O. albiundalis

Binomial name
- Ophias albiundalis Ragonot, 1891

Genus of moths

Ophias is a monotypic snout moth genus. Its only species, Ophias albiundalis, was described by Émile Louis Ragonot in February 1891. It is found in Pernambuco, Brazil.
