= Blepharocerus =

Scientific classification
- Domain: Eukaryota
- Kingdom: Animalia
- Phylum: Arthropoda
- Class: Insecta
- Order: Lepidoptera
- Family: Pyralidae
- Subfamily: Chrysauginae
- Genus: Blepharocerus; C. É. Blanchard, 1852

Genus of moths

Blepharocerus is a genus of snout moths. It was described by Charles Émile Blanchard in 1852, and is known from Trinidad.

== Species ==
- Blepharocerus chilensis Zeller, 1874
- Blepharocerus ignitalis Hampson, 1906
- Blepharocerus rosellus Blanchard, 1852
- Blepharocerus rubescens (Kaye, 1925)
