= Casuaria catocalis =

Scientific classification
- Domain: Eukaryota
- Kingdom: Animalia
- Phylum: Arthropoda
- Class: Insecta
- Order: Lepidoptera
- Family: Pyralidae
- Genus: Casuaria
- Species: C. catocalis

Binomial name
- Casuaria catocalis (Ragonot, 1891)

Synonyms
- Saccopleura catocalis Ragonot, 1891

Species of moth

Casuaria catocalis is a species of snout moth in the genus Casuaria. It was described by Émile Louis Ragonot in 1891, and is known from Panama.
