= Dastira =

Scientific classification
- Kingdom: Animalia
- Phylum: Arthropoda
- Class: Insecta
- Order: Lepidoptera
- Family: Pyralidae
- Subfamily: Chrysauginae
- Genus: Dastira; Walker, 1859
- Species: D. hippialis

Binomial name
- Dastira hippialis Walker, 1859

Genus of moths

Dastira is a genus of snout moths. It was described by Francis Walker in 1859, and contains the species Dastira hippialis. It is found in Brazil.
