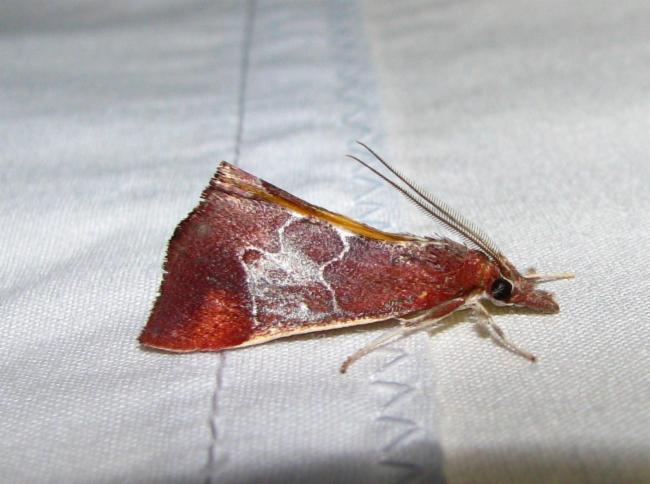

Scientific classification
- Kingdom: Animalia
- Phylum: Arthropoda
- Class: Insecta
- Order: Lepidoptera
- Family: Pyralidae
- Subfamily: Chrysauginae
- Genus: Anemosa; Walker, 1859

Synonyms
- Drymiarcha Meyrick, 1885

= Anemosa =

Genus of moths

Anemosa is a genus of snout moths. It was described by Francis Walker, in 1859, and is known from Australia.

== Species ==
- Anemosa exanthes (Meyrick, 1885)
- Anemosa isadasalis Walker, 1859
