= Murgisca cervinalis =

Scientific classification
- Kingdom: Animalia
- Phylum: Arthropoda
- Class: Insecta
- Order: Lepidoptera
- Family: Pyralidae
- Genus: Murgisca
- Species: M. cervinalis

Binomial name
- Murgisca cervinalis Walker, 1863

Species of moth

Murgisca cervinalis is a species of snout moth in the genus Murgisca. It was described by Francis Walker in 1863, and is known from the Dominican Republic.
