= Casuaria armata =

Scientific classification
- Kingdom: Animalia
- Phylum: Arthropoda
- Class: Insecta
- Order: Lepidoptera
- Family: Pyralidae
- Genus: Casuaria
- Species: C. armata

Binomial name
- Casuaria armata Walker, 1866

Synonyms
- Tamyra physophora Felder & Rogenhofer, 1875

Species of moth

Casuaria armata is a species of snout moth in the genus Casuaria. It was described by Francis Walker in 1866, and is known from Brazil and Colombia.
