= Cromarcha =

Scientific classification
- Kingdom: Animalia
- Phylum: Arthropoda
- Class: Insecta
- Order: Lepidoptera
- Family: Pyralidae
- Subfamily: Chrysauginae
- Genus: Cromarcha; Dyar, 1914

Genus of moths

Cromarcha is a genus of snout moths. It was described by Harrison Gray Dyar Jr. in 1914.

== Species ==
- Cromarcha polybata
- Cromarcha stroudagnesia
