= Oectoperodes =

Scientific classification
- Kingdom: Animalia
- Phylum: Arthropoda
- Class: Insecta
- Order: Lepidoptera
- Family: Pyralidae
- Subfamily: Chrysauginae
- Genus: Oectoperodes; Ragonot, 1892
- Species: O. rufitinctalis

Binomial name
- Oectoperodes rufitinctalis Ragonot, 1892

Genus of moths

Oectoperodes is a monotypic snout moth genus. Its only species, Oectoperodes rufitinctalis, was described by Émile Louis Ragonot in 1892. It is found in Brazil.
