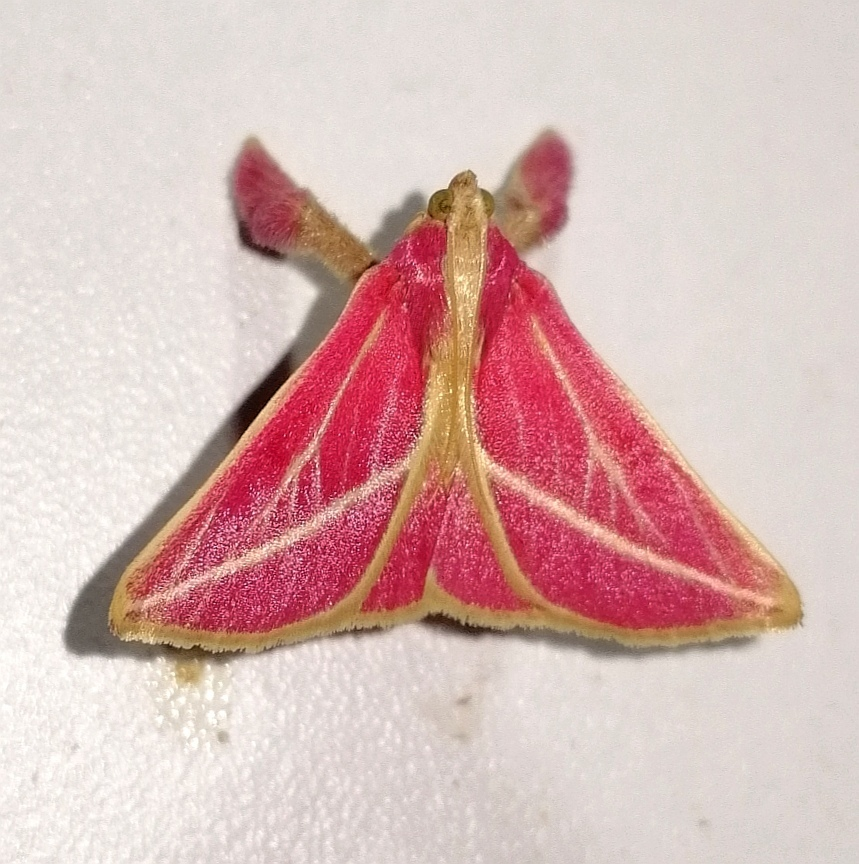

Scientific classification
- Kingdom: Animalia
- Phylum: Arthropoda
- Class: Insecta
- Order: Lepidoptera
- Family: Pyralidae
- Genus: Pachypodistes
- Species: P. angulata

Binomial name
- Pachypodistes angulata Hampson, 1916

= Pachypodistes angulata =

Species of moth

Pachypodistes angulata is a species of snout moth in the genus Pachypodistes. It is found in Colombia, Ecuador and Peru.

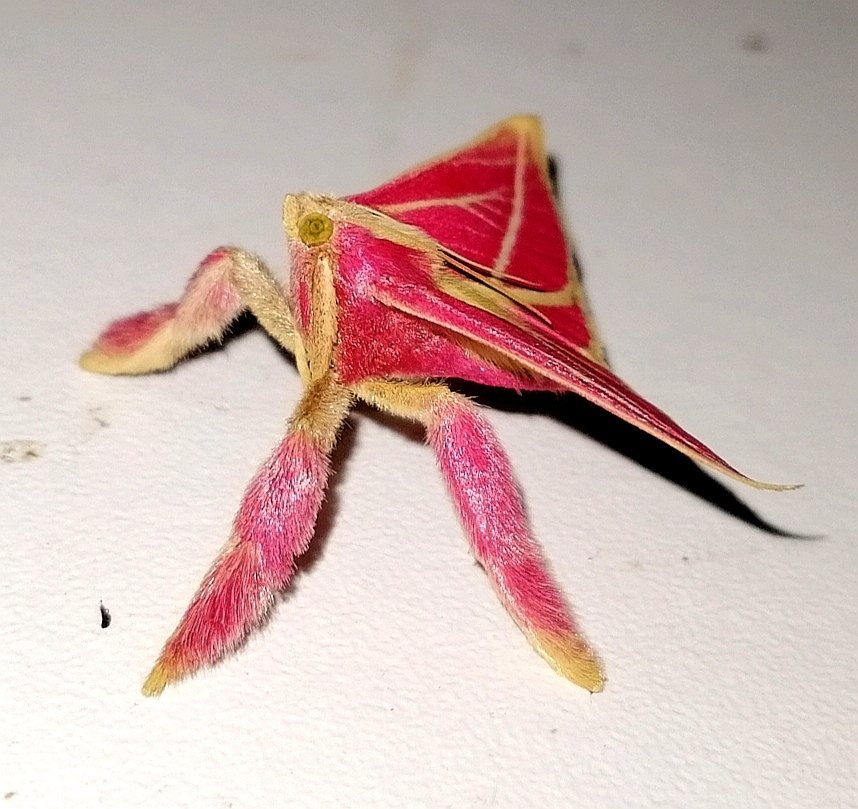
In Ecuador
