= Salobrena (moth) =

Scientific classification
- Kingdom: Animalia
- Phylum: Arthropoda
- Class: Insecta
- Order: Lepidoptera
- Family: Pyralidae
- Subfamily: Chrysauginae
- Genus: Salobrena; Walker, 1863

Synonyms
- Oectoperia Zeller, 1875; Ballonicha Möschler, 1886; Teucronoma Meyrick, 1936

Genus of moths

Salobrena is a genus of moths of the family Pyralidae. The genus was erected by Francis Walker in 1863.

== Species ==
- Salobrena cyrisalis H. Druce, 1895 Mexico
- Salobrena dicela Dyar, 1914 Panama
- Salobrena excisana Walker, 1863
- Salobrena gibbosa (Felder & Rogenhofer, 1875) Colombia
- Salobrena platybathyralis (Dyar, 1914) Panama
- Salobrena propylea (H. Druce, 1895) Mexico
- Salobrena recurvata (Möschler, 1886) Jamaica
- Salobrena rubiginea (Hampson, 1897) Dominica
- Salobrena sincera (Zeller, 1875) Texas
- Salobrena toxocrossa (Meyrick, 1936) Venezuela
