= Monoloxis graphitalis =

Scientific classification
- Domain: Eukaryota
- Kingdom: Animalia
- Phylum: Arthropoda
- Class: Insecta
- Order: Lepidoptera
- Family: Pyralidae
- Genus: Monoloxis
- Species: M. graphitalis

Binomial name
- Monoloxis graphitalis (C. Felder, R. Felder & Rogenhofer, 1875)

Synonyms
- Amblyura graphitalis C. Felder, R. Felder & Rogenhofer, 1875

Species of moth

Monoloxis graphitalis is a species of snout moth in the genus Monoloxis. It was described by Cajetan Felder, Rudolf Felder and Alois Friedrich Rogenhofer in 1875. It is found in Brazil (including Amazonas, the type location).
