= Polyterpnes =

Scientific classification
- Kingdom: Animalia
- Phylum: Arthropoda
- Class: Insecta
- Order: Lepidoptera
- Family: Pyralidae
- Subfamily: Chrysauginae
- Genus: Polyterpnes; Turner, 1932
- Species: P. polyrrhoda

Binomial name
- Polyterpnes polyrrhoda Turner, 1932

Genus of moths

Polyterpnes is a monotypic snout moth genus described by Alfred Jefferis Turner in 1932. Its one species, Polyterpnes polyrrhoda, was described by Turner in the same paper.
