= Michaelshaffera maidoa =

Scientific classification
- Domain: Eukaryota
- Kingdom: Animalia
- Phylum: Arthropoda
- Class: Insecta
- Order: Lepidoptera
- Family: Pyralidae
- Genus: Michaelshaffera
- Species: M. maidoa

Binomial name
- Michaelshaffera maidoa (Schaus, 1922)

Synonyms
- Stericta maidoa Schaus, 1922

Species of moth

Michaelshaffera maidoa is a species of snout moth in the genus Michaelshaffera. It was described by Schaus in 1922. It is found in French Guiana.
