= Arouva mirificana =

Scientific classification
- Kingdom: Animalia
- Phylum: Arthropoda
- Class: Insecta
- Order: Lepidoptera
- Family: Pyralidae
- Genus: Arouva
- Species: A. mirificana

Binomial name
- Arouva mirificana Walker, 1864

Synonyms
- Semnia egaealis C. Felder, R. Felder & Rogenhofer, 1875; Semnia aegialis

Species of moth

Arouva mirificana is a species of snout moth in the genus Arouva. It was described by Francis Walker in 1864, and is known from Brazil.
