= Ocoba =

Scientific classification
- Kingdom: Animalia
- Phylum: Arthropoda
- Class: Insecta
- Order: Lepidoptera
- Family: Pyralidae
- Subfamily: Chrysauginae
- Genus: Ocoba; Dyar, 1914
- Species: O. melanophila

Binomial name
- Ocoba melanophila Dyar, 1914

Genus of moths

Ocoba is a monotypic snout moth genus. Its one species, Ocoba melanophila, was described by Harrison Gray Dyar Jr. in 1914. It is found in Panama.
