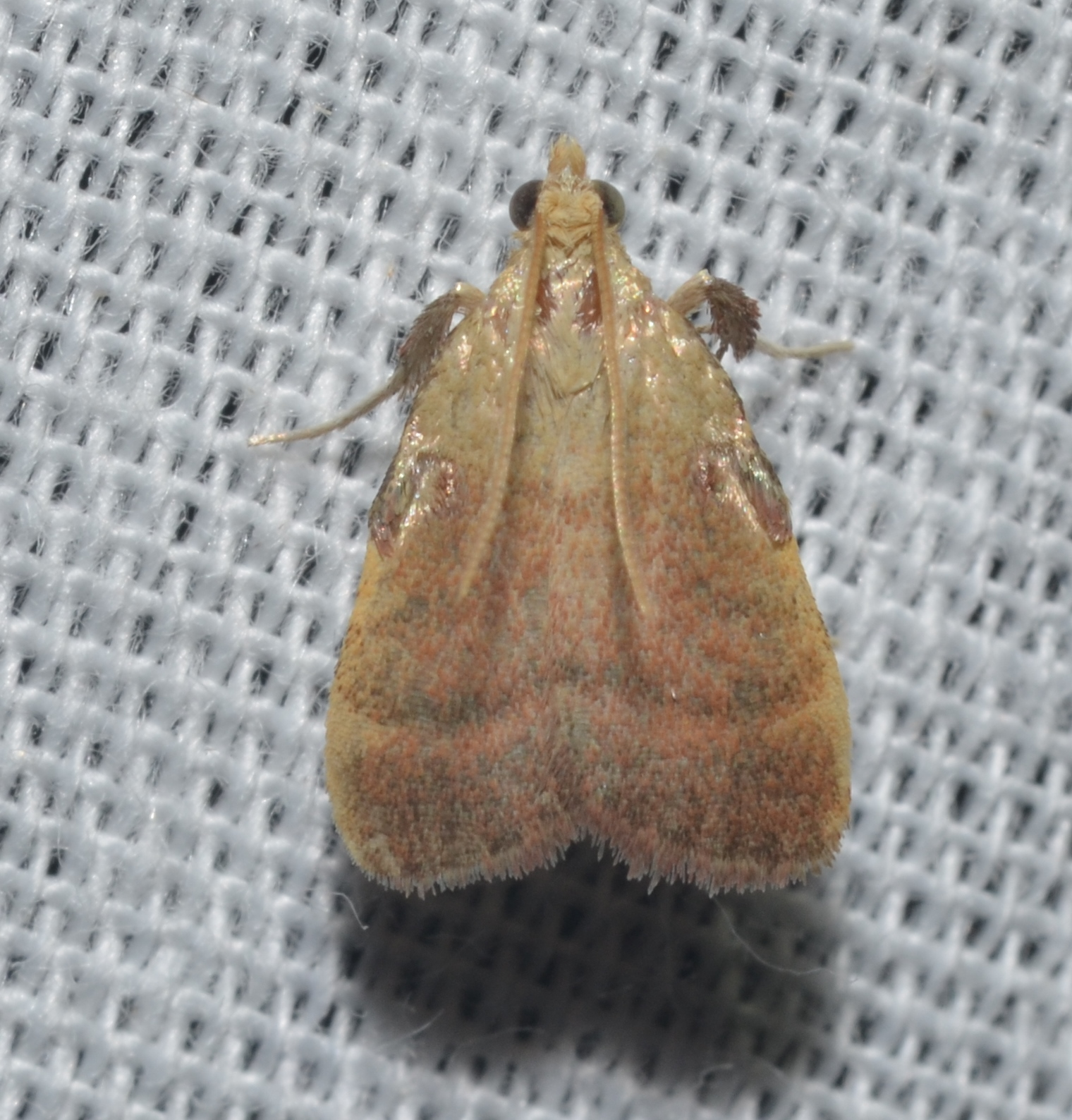
- Condylolomia participalis

Scientific classification
- Kingdom: Animalia
- Phylum: Arthropoda
- Class: Insecta
- Order: Lepidoptera
- Family: Pyralidae
- Subfamily: Chrysauginae
- Genus: Condylolomia; Grote, 1873

Synonyms
- Cordylolomia Rye, 1875

= Condylolomia =

Genus of moths

Condylolomia is a genus of snout moths. It was described by Augustus Radcliffe Grote in 1873.

== Species ==
- Condylolomia metapachys Hampson, 1897
- Condylolomia participalis Grote, 1873
