= Microzancla =

Scientific classification
- Kingdom: Animalia
- Phylum: Arthropoda
- Class: Insecta
- Order: Lepidoptera
- Family: Pyralidae
- Subfamily: Chrysauginae
- Genus: Microzancla; Hampson, 1897
- Species: M. ignitalis

Binomial name
- Microzancla ignitalis Hampson, 1897

Genus of moths

Microzancla is a monotypic snout moth genus. Its single species, Microzancla ignitalis, was described by George Hampson in 1897. It is found in the Brazilian states of São Paulo and Rio de Janeiro.
