= Blepharocerus rosellus =

Scientific classification
- Kingdom: Animalia
- Phylum: Arthropoda
- Class: Insecta
- Order: Lepidoptera
- Family: Pyralidae
- Genus: Blepharocerus
- Species: B. rosellus

Binomial name
- Blepharocerus rosellus C. É. Blanchard, 1852

Synonyms
- Asopia rufulalis Lederer, 1863

Species of moth

Blepharocerus rosellus is a species of snout moth in the genus Blepharocerus. It was described by Charles Émile Blanchard in 1852. It is found in Chile.
