= Casuaria excissimalis =

Scientific classification
- Kingdom: Animalia
- Phylum: Arthropoda
- Class: Insecta
- Order: Lepidoptera
- Family: Pyralidae
- Genus: Casuaria
- Species: C. excissimalis

Binomial name
- Casuaria excissimalis (Dyar, 1923)

Synonyms
- Saccopleura excissimalis Dyar, 1923

Species of moth

Casuaria excissimalis is a species of snout moth in the genus Casuaria. It was described by Harrison Gray Dyar Jr. in 1923, and is known from Mexico.
