= Cromarcha polybata =

Scientific classification
- Kingdom: Animalia
- Phylum: Arthropoda
- Class: Insecta
- Order: Lepidoptera
- Family: Pyralidae
- Genus: Cromarcha
- Species: C. polybata

Binomial name
- Cromarcha polybata Dyar, 1914

Species of moth

Cromarcha polybata is a species of snout moth. It was described by Harrison Gray Dyar Jr. in 1914. It is found in Mexico.
