= Idneodes =

Scientific classification
- Kingdom: Animalia
- Phylum: Arthropoda
- Class: Insecta
- Order: Lepidoptera
- Family: Pyralidae
- Subfamily: Chrysauginae
- Genus: Idneodes; Ragonot, 1892
- Species: I. tretopteralis

Binomial name
- Idneodes tretopteralis Ragonot, 1892

Genus of moths

Idneodes is a genus of snout moths. It was described by Émile Louis Ragonot in 1892, and contains the species Idneodes tretopteralis. It is found in Brazil.
