= Drepanodia =

Scientific classification
- Kingdom: Animalia
- Phylum: Arthropoda
- Class: Insecta
- Order: Lepidoptera
- Family: Pyralidae
- Subfamily: Chrysauginae
- Genus: Drepanodia; Ragonot, 1892
- Species: D. xerophyllalis

Binomial name
- Drepanodia xerophyllalis Ragonot, 1892

Genus of moths

Drepanodia is a genus of snout moths. It was described by Émile Louis Ragonot in 1892, and contains the species D. xerophyllalis. It is found in Brazil.
