= Itambe fenestalis =

Scientific classification
- Kingdom: Animalia
- Phylum: Arthropoda
- Clade: Pancrustacea
- Class: Insecta
- Order: Lepidoptera
- Superfamily: Pyraloidea
- Family: Pyralidae
- Subfamily: Chrysauginae
- Genus: Itambe; Ragonot, 1892
- Species: I. fenestalis

Binomial name
- Itambe fenestalis Ragonot, 1892

Species of moth

Itambe is a monotypic snout moth genus. It was described by Émile Louis Ragonot in 1892, and contains the species Itambe fenestalis. It is found in Brazil.
