= Idnea altana =

Scientific classification
- Kingdom: Animalia
- Phylum: Arthropoda
- Class: Insecta
- Order: Lepidoptera
- Family: Pyralidae
- Genus: Idnea
- Species: I. altana

Binomial name
- Idnea altana (Walker, 1863)

Synonyms
- Torda altana Walker, 1863; Corybissa congruana Walker, 1863

Species of moth

Idnea altana is a species of snout moth in the genus Idnea. It was described by Francis Walker in 1863. It is found in Brazil.
