= Epidelia =

Scientific classification
- Kingdom: Animalia
- Phylum: Arthropoda
- Class: Insecta
- Order: Lepidoptera
- Family: Pyralidae
- Subfamily: Chrysauginae
- Genus: Epidelia; Ragonot, 1891
- Species: E. viridalis

Binomial name
- Epidelia viridalis Ragonot, 1891

Genus of moths

Epidelia is a genus of snout moths. It was described by Ragonot in 1891, and contains the species E. viridalis. It is found in Panama.
