= Casuaria =

Scientific classification
- Kingdom: Animalia
- Phylum: Arthropoda
- Class: Insecta
- Order: Lepidoptera
- Family: Pyralidae
- Subfamily: Chrysauginae
- Genus: Casuaria; Walker, 1866

Synonyms
- Saccopleura Ragonot, 1891

Genus of moths

Casuaria is a genus of snout moths (family Pyralidae, subfamily Pyralinae). It was described by Francis Walker in 1866 and has been recorded in Brazil.

== Species ==
- Casuaria armata Walker, 1866
- Casuaria catocalis (Ragonot, 1891)
- Casuaria crumena (C. Felder, R. Felder & Rogenhofer, 1875)
- Casuaria excissimalis (Dyar, 1923)
