= Mimetauge =

Scientific classification
- Kingdom: Animalia
- Phylum: Arthropoda
- Class: Insecta
- Order: Lepidoptera
- Family: Pyralidae
- Subfamily: Chrysauginae
- Genus: Mimetauge; Munroe, 1970
- Species: M. napeogenalis

Binomial name
- Mimetauge napeogenalis Munroe, 1970

Genus of moths

Mimetauge is a monotypic snout moth genus. Its one species, Mimetauge napeogenalis, was described by Eugene G. Munroe in 1970. It is found in Peru.
