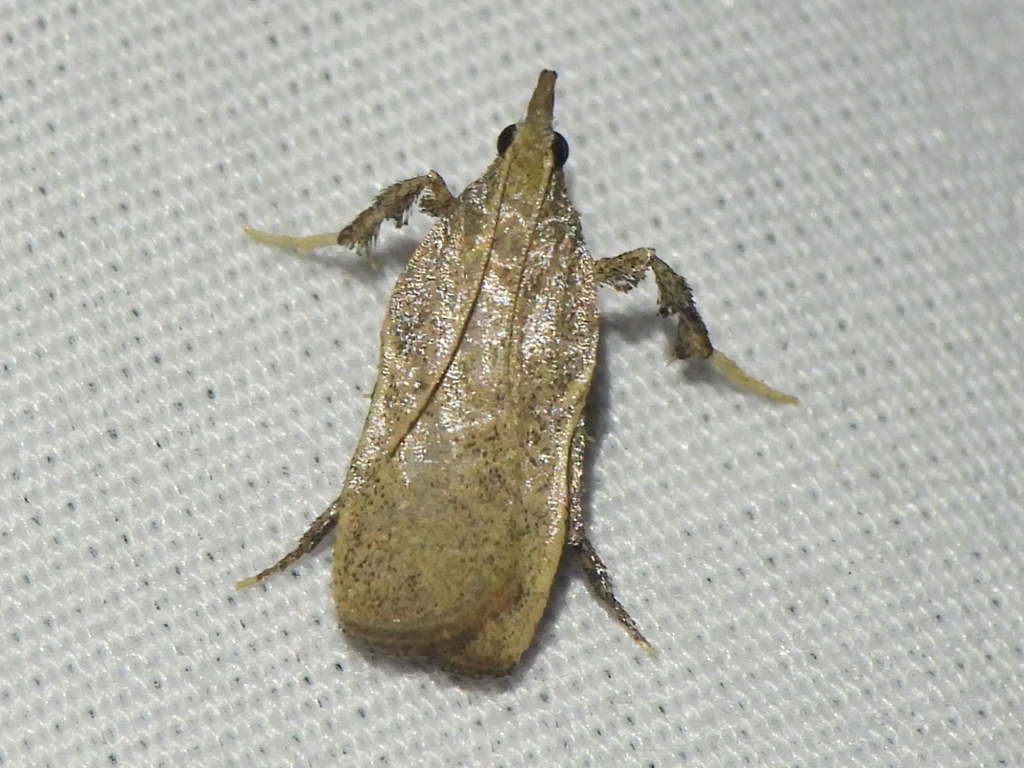

Scientific classification
- Kingdom: Animalia
- Phylum: Arthropoda
- Class: Insecta
- Order: Lepidoptera
- Family: Pyralidae
- Subfamily: Chrysauginae
- Genus: Negalasa; Barnes & McDunnough, 1913
- Species: N. fumalis

Binomial name
- Negalasa fumalis Barnes & McDunnough, 1913

Synonyms
- Negalasa rubralis Barnes & McDunnough, 1913

= Negalasa =

Genus of moths

Negalasa is a monotypic snout moth genus (family Pyralidae). Its one species, Negalasa fumalis, is found in the US state of Arizona. Both the genus and species were described by William Barnes and James Halliday McDunnough in 1913 in the same paper.

The wingspan is about 19 mm.

== Subspecies ==
- Negalasa fumalis fumalis
- Negalasa fumalis rubralis Barnes & McDunnough, 1913
