= Blepharocerus rubescens =

Scientific classification
- Domain: Eukaryota
- Kingdom: Animalia
- Phylum: Arthropoda
- Class: Insecta
- Order: Lepidoptera
- Family: Pyralidae
- Genus: Blepharocerus
- Species: B. rubescens

Binomial name
- Blepharocerus rubescens (Kaye, 1925)

Synonyms
- Galleria rubescens Kaye, 1925

Species of moth

Blepharocerus rubescens is a species of snout moth in the genus Blepharocerus. It was described by William James Kaye in 1925, and is known from Trinidad.
