= Martiniodes =

Scientific classification
- Domain: Eukaryota
- Kingdom: Animalia
- Phylum: Arthropoda
- Class: Insecta
- Order: Lepidoptera
- Family: Pyralidae
- Subfamily: Chrysauginae
- Genus: Martiniodes; Amsel, 1956
- Species: M. sacculalis

Binomial name
- Martiniodes sacculalis Amsel, 1956

Genus of moths

Martiniodes is a monotypic snout moth genus. Its one species, Martiniodes sacculalis, was described by Hans Georg Amsel in 1956. It is found in Venezuela.
