= Murgisca pyrophoralis =

Scientific classification
- Kingdom: Animalia
- Phylum: Arthropoda
- Class: Insecta
- Order: Lepidoptera
- Family: Pyralidae
- Genus: Murgisca
- Species: M. pyrophoralis

Binomial name
- Murgisca pyrophoralis Hampson, 1916

Species of moth

Murgisca pyrophoralis is a species of snout moth in the genus Murgisca. It is found in Peru.
