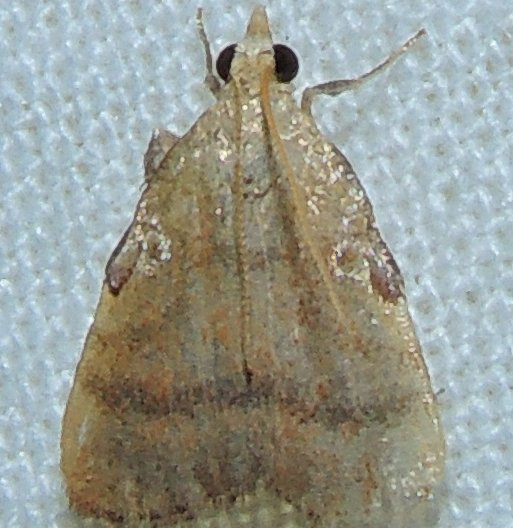

Scientific classification
- Kingdom: Animalia
- Phylum: Arthropoda
- Clade: Pancrustacea
- Class: Insecta
- Order: Lepidoptera
- Family: Pyralidae
- Genus: Condylolomia
- Species: C. participalis

Binomial name
- Condylolomia participalis Grote, 1873

= Condylolomia participalis =

Species of moth

Condylolomia participalis, the drab condylolomia moth, is a species of snout moth in the genus Condylolomia. It was described by Augustus Radcliffe Grote in 1873. It is found in eastern North America, from southern Quebec to North Carolina, west to Nebraska and Minnesota.

Larvae have been found inside rolled leaf tips of Myrica gale.
