= Callasopia =

Scientific classification
- Kingdom: Animalia
- Phylum: Arthropoda
- Class: Insecta
- Order: Lepidoptera
- Family: Pyralidae
- Subfamily: Chrysauginae
- Genus: Callasopia; Möschler, 1890
- Species: C. rosealis

Binomial name
- Callasopia rosealis Möschler, 1890

Genus of moths

Callasopia is a genus of snout moths. It was described by Heinrich Benno Möschler in 1890, and contains the species Callasopia rosealis. It is found in Puerto Rico.
