= Arouva =

Scientific classification
- Kingdom: Animalia
- Phylum: Arthropoda
- Class: Insecta
- Order: Lepidoptera
- Family: Pyralidae
- Subfamily: Chrysauginae
- Genus: Arouva; Walker, 1864

Genus of moths

Arouva is a genus of snout moths. It was described by Francis Walker in 1864.

== Species ==
- Arouva albivitta (C. Felder, R. Felder & Rogenhofer, 1875)
- Arouva castanealis Hampson, 1906
- Arouva mirificana Walker, 1864
