= Blepharocerus ignitalis =

Scientific classification
- Kingdom: Animalia
- Phylum: Arthropoda
- Class: Insecta
- Order: Lepidoptera
- Family: Pyralidae
- Genus: Blepharocerus
- Species: B. ignitalis

Binomial name
- Blepharocerus ignitalis Hampson, 1906

Species of moth

Blepharocerus ignitalis, the flame-bordered longhorn, is a species of snout moth in the genus Blepharocerus. It was described by George Hampson in 1906. It is found from Mexico to Bolivia, where it is known from montane woodland and cloudforest habitats.
