= Nachaba auritalis =

Scientific classification
- Kingdom: Animalia
- Phylum: Arthropoda
- Class: Insecta
- Order: Lepidoptera
- Family: Pyralidae
- Genus: Nachaba
- Species: N. auritalis

Binomial name
- Nachaba auritalis Walker, 1859

Species of moth

Nachaba auritalis is a species of snout moth in the genus Nachaba. It is found in Brazil.
