= Holoperas innotata =

Scientific classification
- Domain: Eukaryota
- Kingdom: Animalia
- Phylum: Arthropoda
- Class: Insecta
- Order: Lepidoptera
- Family: Pyralidae
- Genus: Holoperas
- Species: H. innotata

Binomial name
- Holoperas innotata Warren, 1891

Species of moth

Holoperas innotata is a species of snout moth in the genus Holoperas. It was described by William Warren in 1891. It is found in Colombia.
