= Cyclidalis =

Scientific classification
- Kingdom: Animalia
- Phylum: Arthropoda
- Class: Insecta
- Order: Lepidoptera
- Family: Pyralidae
- Subfamily: Chrysauginae
- Genus: Cyclidalis; Hampson, 1906
- Species: C. chrysealis

Binomial name
- Cyclidalis chrysealis Hampson, 1906

Genus of moths

Cyclidalis is a genus of snout moths. It was described by George Hampson in 1906, and contains the species Cyclidalis chrysealis. It is found in the Brazilian state of São Paulo.
