= Hyperparachma congrualis =

Scientific classification
- Kingdom: Animalia
- Phylum: Arthropoda
- Clade: Pancrustacea
- Class: Insecta
- Order: Lepidoptera
- Family: Pyralidae
- Genus: Hyperparachma
- Species: H. congrualis

Binomial name
- Hyperparachma congrualis (Amsel, 1956)

Synonyms
- Parachmopsis congrualis Amsel, 1956

Species of moth

Hyperparachma congrualis is a species of snout moth in the genus Hyperparachma. It was described by Hans Georg Amsel in 1956, and is known from Venezuela.
