= Humiphila =

Scientific classification
- Kingdom: Animalia
- Phylum: Arthropoda
- Class: Insecta
- Order: Lepidoptera
- Family: Pyralidae
- Subfamily: Chrysauginae
- Genus: Humiphila; Becker, 1974
- Species: H. paleolivacea

Binomial name
- Humiphila paleolivacea Becker, 1974

Genus of moths

Humiphila is a monotypic snout moth genus. It was described by V. O. Becker in 1974, and contains the species Humiphila paleolivacea. It is found in Costa Rica.
