= Carcha violalis =

Scientific classification
- Kingdom: Animalia
- Phylum: Arthropoda
- Class: Insecta
- Order: Lepidoptera
- Family: Pyralidae
- Genus: Carcha
- Species: C. violalis

Binomial name
- Carcha violalis Hampson, 1897

Species of moth

Carcha violalis is a species of snout moth in the genus Carcha. It was described by George Hampson in 1897 and is known from Brazil (it was described from Espírito Santo)
