= Nachaba funerea =

Scientific classification
- Domain: Eukaryota
- Kingdom: Animalia
- Phylum: Arthropoda
- Class: Insecta
- Order: Lepidoptera
- Family: Pyralidae
- Genus: Nachaba
- Species: N. funerea

Binomial name
- Nachaba funerea (C. Felder, R. Felder & Rogenhofer, 1875)

Synonyms
- Semnia funerea Felder & Rogenhofer, 1875

Species of moth

Nachaba funerea is a species of snout moth in the genus Nachaba. It was described by Cajetan Felder, Rudolf Felder and Alois Friedrich Rogenhofer in 1875, and is known from Amazonas, Brazil.
