= Catadupa integrana =

Scientific classification
- Kingdom: Animalia
- Phylum: Arthropoda
- Class: Insecta
- Order: Lepidoptera
- Family: Pyralidae
- Subfamily: Chrysauginae
- Genus: Catadupa; Walker, 1863
- Species: C. integrana

Binomial name
- Catadupa integrana Walker, 1863

Species of moth

Catadupa integrana is the only species in the monotypic moth genus Catadupa of the family Pyralidae (snout moths). Both the genus and species were described by Francis Walker in 1863. It is found in Brazil.
