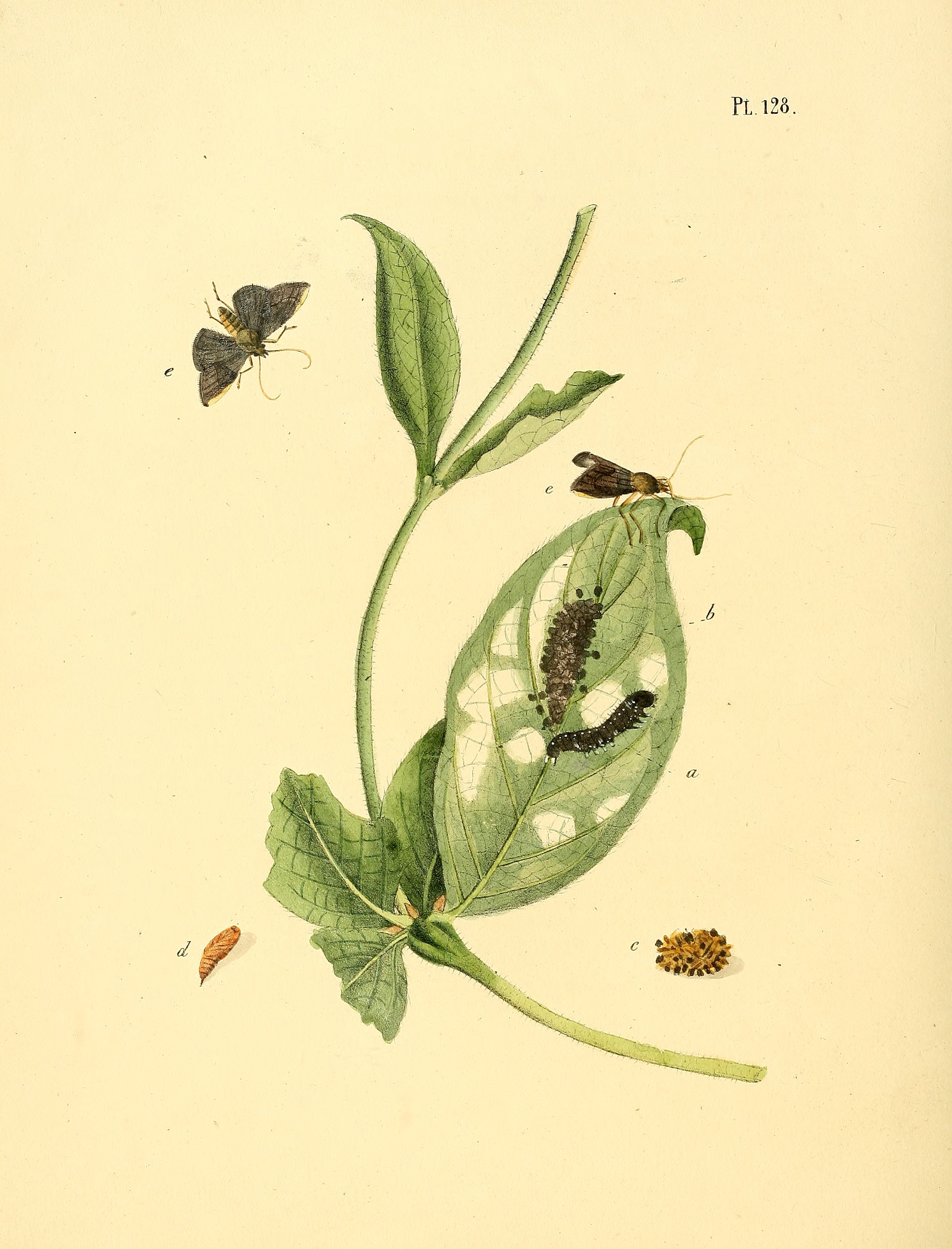
- as Phalaena flavicinctalis from Sepp

Scientific classification
- Domain: Eukaryota
- Kingdom: Animalia
- Phylum: Arthropoda
- Class: Insecta
- Order: Lepidoptera
- Family: Pyralidae
- Genus: Monoloxis
- Species: M. flavicinctalis

Binomial name
- Monoloxis flavicinctalis (Sepp, 1852)

Synonyms
- Phalaena flavicinctalis Sepp, 1852; Abaera flavicinctalis (Sepp, 1852)

= Monoloxis flavicinctalis =

Species of moth

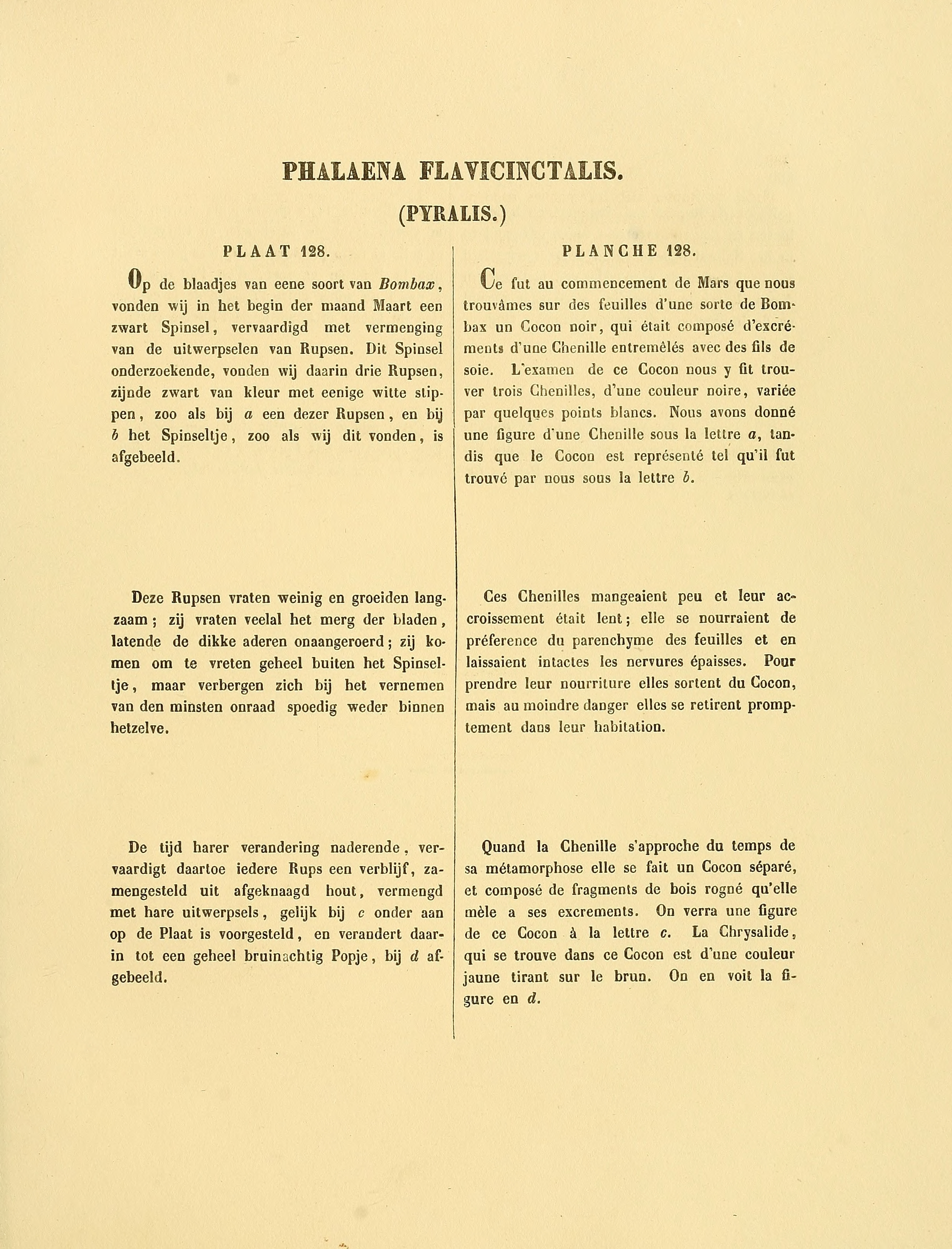
Text for Pl 128

Monoloxis flavicinctalis is a species of snout moth in the genus Monoloxis. It was described by Jan Sepp in 1852, and is known from Suriname and Brazil.

The caterpillars of this species make a cocoon was composed of the caterpillars' interwoven with threads of silk. Approaching the time of metamorphosis, it makes a separate cocoon, composed of fragments of trimmed wood mixed with its excrement.
