= Hypocosmia =

Scientific classification
- Domain: Eukaryota
- Kingdom: Animalia
- Phylum: Arthropoda
- Class: Insecta
- Order: Lepidoptera
- Family: Pyralidae
- Subfamily: Chrysauginae
- Genus: Hypocosmia; Ragonot, 1891

Genus of moths

Hypocosmia is a genus of snout moths. It was described by Émile Louis Ragonot in 1891.

== Species ==
- Hypocosmia bimaculalis Dyar, 1914 (from Panama)
- Hypocosmia definitalis Ragonot, 1891 (from Venezuela)
- Hypocosmia floralis (Stoll in Cramer & Stoll, 1872) (from Suriname)
- Hypocosmia pyrochroma (E. D. Jones, 1912) (from Brazil)
- Hypocosmia rectilinealis Dyar, 1914 (from Panama)
