= Gephyra getusalis =

Scientific classification
- Kingdom: Animalia
- Phylum: Arthropoda
- Class: Insecta
- Order: Lepidoptera
- Family: Pyralidae
- Genus: Gephyra
- Species: G. getusalis

Binomial name
- Gephyra getusalis Walker, 1859

Species of moth

Gephyra getusalis is a species of snout moth in the genus Gephyra. It was described by Francis Walker in 1859 and is known from Brazil.
