= Holoperas =

Scientific classification
- Domain: Eukaryota
- Kingdom: Animalia
- Phylum: Arthropoda
- Class: Insecta
- Order: Lepidoptera
- Family: Pyralidae
- Subfamily: Chrysauginae
- Genus: Holoperas; Warren, 1891

Genus of moths

Holoperas is a genus of snout moths. It was described by William Warren in 1891.

== Species ==
- Holoperas innotata Warren, 1891
- Holoperas oenochroalis Ragonot, 1890
