= Carcha undulatalis =

Scientific classification
- Domain: Eukaryota
- Kingdom: Animalia
- Phylum: Arthropoda
- Class: Insecta
- Order: Lepidoptera
- Family: Pyralidae
- Genus: Carcha
- Species: C. undulatalis

Binomial name
- Carcha undulatalis Amsel, 1956

Species of moth

Carcha undulatalis is a species of snout moth in the genus Carcha. It was described by Hans Georg Amsel in 1956 and is known from Venezuela.
