= Murgisca diplommatalis =

Scientific classification
- Domain: Eukaryota
- Kingdom: Animalia
- Phylum: Arthropoda
- Class: Insecta
- Order: Lepidoptera
- Family: Pyralidae
- Genus: Murgisca
- Species: M. diplommatalis

Binomial name
- Murgisca diplommatalis Dyar, 1914

Species of moth

Murgisca diplommatalis is a species of snout moth in the genus Murgisca. It is found in Panama.
