= Nachaba reconditana =

Scientific classification
- Kingdom: Animalia
- Phylum: Arthropoda
- Class: Insecta
- Order: Lepidoptera
- Family: Pyralidae
- Genus: Nachaba
- Species: N. reconditana

Binomial name
- Nachaba reconditana (Walker, 1864)

Synonyms
- Ascha reconditana Walker, 1864

Species of moth

Nachaba reconditana is a species of snout moth in the genus Nachaba. It was described by Francis Walker in 1864, and is known from Brazil.
