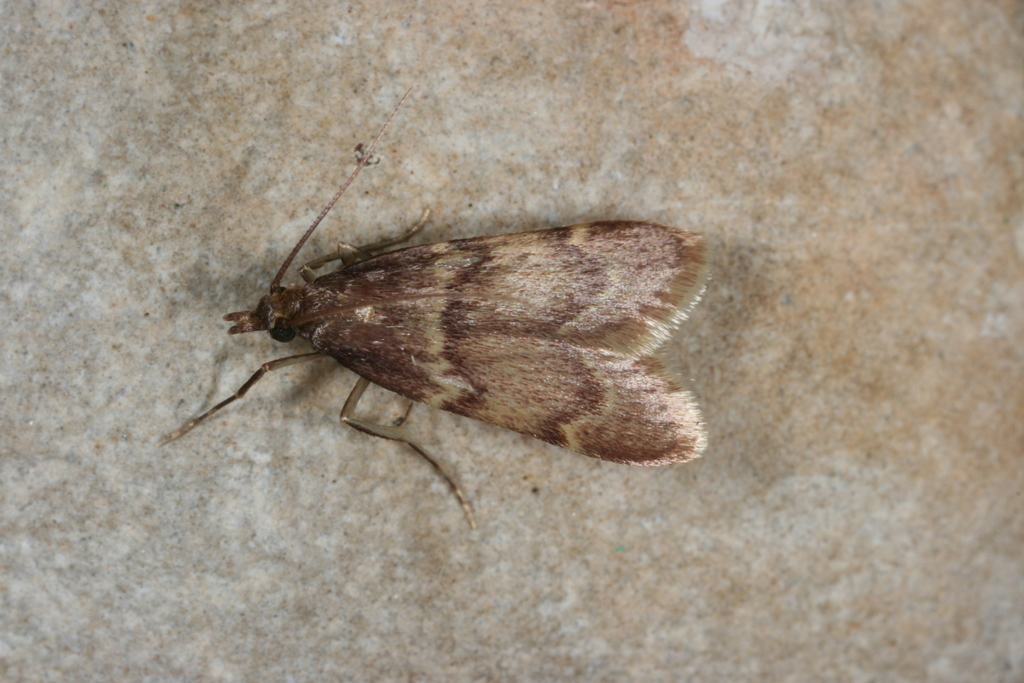

Scientific classification
- Kingdom: Animalia
- Phylum: Arthropoda
- Clade: Pancrustacea
- Class: Insecta
- Order: Lepidoptera
- Family: Pyralidae
- Genus: Acallis
- Species: A. griphalis

Binomial name
- Acallis griphalis (Hulst, 1886)

Synonyms
- Aglossa griphalis Hulst, 1886; Acallis fernaldi Ragonot, 1891; Ugra angustipennis Warren, 1891; Acallis centralis Dyar, 1910

= Acallis gripalis =

Species of moth

Acallis griphalis is a species of snout moth in the genus Acallis. It was described by George Duryea Hulst in 1886. It is found in North America, including Colorado, British Columbia, California and Arizona.

The wingspan is about 20 mm.
