= Microrca =

Scientific classification
- Kingdom: Animalia
- Phylum: Arthropoda
- Class: Insecta
- Order: Lepidoptera
- Family: Pyralidae
- Subfamily: Chrysauginae
- Genus: Microrca; Amsel, 1956
- Species: M. bistrialis

Binomial name
- Microrca bistrialis Amsel, 1956

Genus of moths

Microrca is a monotypic snout moth genus containing only the species Microrca bistrialis. It was described by Hans Georg Amsel in 1956 and is found in Venezuela.
