= Condylolomia metapachys =

Scientific classification
- Kingdom: Animalia
- Phylum: Arthropoda
- Class: Insecta
- Order: Lepidoptera
- Family: Pyralidae
- Genus: Condylolomia
- Species: C. metapachys

Binomial name
- Condylolomia metapachys Hampson, 1897

Species of moth

Condylolomia metapachys is a species of snout moth. It was described by George Hampson in 1897, and is known from Brazil.
