= Abaera =

Scientific classification
- Kingdom: Animalia
- Phylum: Arthropoda
- Clade: Pancrustacea
- Class: Insecta
- Order: Lepidoptera
- Family: Pyralidae
- Subfamily: Chrysauginae
- Genus: Abaera; Walker, 1859

Genus of moths

Abaera is a genus of moths of the family Pyralidae.

== Species ==
- Abaera aurofusalis Hampson, 1906
- Abaera chalcea Hampson, 1897
- Abaera nactalis Walker, 1859
