= Epiparachma =

Scientific classification
- Kingdom: Animalia
- Phylum: Arthropoda
- Class: Insecta
- Order: Lepidoptera
- Family: Pyralidae
- Subfamily: Chrysauginae
- Genus: Epiparachma; Amsel, 1956
- Species: E. notabila

Binomial name
- Epiparachma notabila Amsel, 1956

Genus of moths

Epiparachma is a monotypic snout moth genus. It was described by Hans Georg Amsel in 1956, and contains the species Epiparachma notabila. It is found in Venezuela.
