= Hypocosmia definitalis =

Scientific classification
- Domain: Eukaryota
- Kingdom: Animalia
- Phylum: Arthropoda
- Class: Insecta
- Order: Lepidoptera
- Family: Pyralidae
- Genus: Hypocosmia
- Species: H. definitalis

Binomial name
- Hypocosmia definitalis Ragonot, 1891

Species of moth

Hypocosmia definitalis is a species of snout moth in the genus Hypocosmia. It was described by Émile Louis Ragonot in 1891, and is known from Venezuela.
