= Diloxis =

Scientific classification
- Kingdom: Animalia
- Phylum: Arthropoda
- Clade: Pancrustacea
- Class: Insecta
- Order: Lepidoptera
- Family: Pyralidae
- Subfamily: Chrysauginae
- Genus: Diloxis; Hampson, 1897
- Species: D. ochriplaga

Binomial name
- Diloxis ochriplaga Hampson, 1897

Genus of moths

Diloxis is a monotypic snout moth genus. It was described by George Hampson in 1897, and contains the species Diloxis ochriplaga. It is found in the Brazilian state of Rio de Janeiro.
