= Lophopleura sublituralis =

Scientific classification
- Domain: Eukaryota
- Kingdom: Animalia
- Phylum: Arthropoda
- Class: Insecta
- Order: Lepidoptera
- Family: Pyralidae
- Genus: Lophopleura
- Species: L. sublituralis

Binomial name
- Lophopleura sublituralis Warren, 1891

Species of moth

Lophopleura sublituralis is a species of snout moth. It was described by William Warren in 1891. It is found in Brazil.
