= Eupilocera =

Scientific classification
- Domain: Eukaryota
- Kingdom: Animalia
- Phylum: Arthropoda
- Class: Insecta
- Order: Lepidoptera
- Family: Pyralidae
- Subfamily: Chrysauginae
- Genus: Eupilocera; Dognin, 1909
- Species: E. gravidalis

Binomial name
- Eupilocera gravidalis Dognin, 1909

Genus of moths

Eupilocera is a monotypic snout moth genus. It was described by Paul Dognin in 1909, and contains the species Eupilocera gravidalis. It is found in French Guiana.
