= Acallis amblytalis =

Scientific classification
- Domain: Eukaryota
- Kingdom: Animalia
- Phylum: Arthropoda
- Class: Insecta
- Order: Lepidoptera
- Family: Pyralidae
- Genus: Acallis
- Species: A. amblytalis

Binomial name
- Acallis amblytalis (Dyar, 1914)

Synonyms
- Acutia amblytalis Dyar, 1914

Species of moth

Acallis amblytalis is a species of snout moth in the genus Acallis. It was described by Harrison Gray Dyar Jr. in 1914, and is known from Panama.
