= Hyperparachma bursarialis =

Scientific classification
- Kingdom: Animalia
- Phylum: Arthropoda
- Class: Insecta
- Order: Lepidoptera
- Family: Pyralidae
- Genus: Hyperparachma
- Species: H. bursarialis

Binomial name
- Hyperparachma bursarialis (Walker, 1866)

Synonyms
- Pyralis bursarialis Walker, [1866]; Hyperparachma rubrifusca Warren, 1891; Hyperparachma butyropis Meyrick, 1936

Species of moth

Hyperparachma bursarialis is a species of snout moth in the genus Hyperparachma. It was described by Francis Walker in 1866, and is known from Honduras, Venezuela, the West Indies and Brazil.
