= Ahyalosticta =

Scientific classification
- Kingdom: Animalia
- Phylum: Arthropoda
- Clade: Pancrustacea
- Class: Insecta
- Order: Lepidoptera
- Family: Pyralidae
- Subfamily: Chrysauginae
- Genus: Ahyalosticta; Amsel, 1956
- Species: A. affinialis

Binomial name
- Ahyalosticta affinialis Amsel, 1956

Genus of moths

Ahyalosticta is a monotypic moth genus of the family Pyralidae described by Hans Georg Amsel in 1956. Its single species is Ahyalosticta affinialis described in the same publication.
