= Anemosa isadasalis =

Scientific classification
- Kingdom: Animalia
- Phylum: Arthropoda
- Class: Insecta
- Order: Lepidoptera
- Family: Pyralidae
- Genus: Anemosa
- Species: A. isadasalis

Binomial name
- Anemosa isadasalis Walker, 1859

Species of moth

Anemosa isadasalis is a species of snout moth in the genus Anemosa. It was described by Francis Walker, in 1859, and is known from Australia.
