= Nachaba flavisparsalis =

Scientific classification
- Kingdom: Animalia
- Phylum: Arthropoda
- Class: Insecta
- Order: Lepidoptera
- Family: Pyralidae
- Genus: Nachaba
- Species: N. flavisparsalis

Binomial name
- Nachaba flavisparsalis Warren, 1891

Species of moth

Nachaba flavisparsalis is a species of snout moth in the genus Nachaba. It is found in Brazilian state of Espírito Santo.
