= Adenopteryx =

Scientific classification
- Kingdom: Animalia
- Phylum: Arthropoda
- Clade: Pancrustacea
- Class: Insecta
- Order: Lepidoptera
- Family: Pyralidae
- Subfamily: Chrysauginae
- Genus: Adenopteryx; Ragonot, 1891
- Species: A. conchyliatalis

Binomial name
- Adenopteryx conchyliatalis Ragonot, 1891

Genus of moths

Adenopteryx is a monotypic moth genus of the family Pyralidae. It contains only one species, Adenopteryx conchyliatalis, which is found in Algeria.
