= Anisothrix agamalis =

Scientific classification
- Kingdom: Animalia
- Phylum: Arthropoda
- Class: Insecta
- Order: Lepidoptera
- Family: Pyralidae
- Genus: Anisothrix
- Species: A. agamalis

Binomial name
- Anisothrix agamalis (Hampson, 1906)

Synonyms
- Dasycnemia agamalis Hampson, 1906

Species of moth

Anisothrix agamalis is a species of snout moth in the genus Anisothrix. It was described by George Hampson in 1906, and is known from Venezuela.
