= Idnea propriana =

Scientific classification
- Kingdom: Animalia
- Phylum: Arthropoda
- Class: Insecta
- Order: Lepidoptera
- Family: Pyralidae
- Genus: Idnea
- Species: I. propriana

Binomial name
- Idnea propriana (Walker, 1863)

Synonyms
- Torda propriana Walker, 1863; Uzeda vitriferana Walker, 1863

Species of moth

Idnea propriana is a species of snout moth in the genus Idnea. It was described by Francis Walker in 1863, and is known from Brazil.
