= Hednotodes =

Scientific classification
- Domain: Eukaryota
- Kingdom: Animalia
- Phylum: Arthropoda
- Class: Insecta
- Order: Lepidoptera
- Family: Pyralidae
- Subfamily: Chrysauginae
- Genus: Hednotodes; Lower, 1893

Synonyms
- Calliphlycta Hampson, 1918

Genus of moths

Hednotodes is a genus of moths of the family Pyralidae.

== Distribution ==
- Australia

== Species ==
- Hednotodes callichroa Lower, 1893
- Hednotodes metaxantha (Hampson, 1918)
