= Hednotodes metaxantha =

Scientific classification
- Kingdom: Animalia
- Phylum: Arthropoda
- Class: Insecta
- Order: Lepidoptera
- Family: Pyralidae
- Genus: Hednotodes
- Species: H. metaxantha

Binomial name
- Hednotodes metaxantha (Hampson, 1918)

Synonyms
- Calliphlycta metaxantha Hampson, 1918

Species of moth

Hednotodes metaxantha is a species of snout moth in the genus Hednotodes. It was described by George Hampson in 1918 and is known from western Australia.
