= Heterauge =

Scientific classification
- Kingdom: Animalia
- Phylum: Arthropoda
- Class: Insecta
- Order: Lepidoptera
- Family: Pyralidae
- Subfamily: Chrysauginae
- Genus: Heterauge; Hampson, 1906
- Species: H. sarcalis

Binomial name
- Heterauge sarcalis Hampson, 1906

Genus of moths

Heterauge is a genus of snout moths. It was described by George Hampson in 1906, and contains the species Heterauge sarcalis. It is found in Brazil.
