= Megacaphys =

Scientific classification
- Kingdom: Animalia
- Phylum: Arthropoda
- Class: Insecta
- Order: Lepidoptera
- Family: Pyralidae
- Subfamily: Chrysauginae
- Genus: Megacaphys; Hampson, 1916
- Species: M. titana

Binomial name
- Megacaphys titana (Schaus, 1904)

Synonyms
- Caphys titana Schaus, 1904

Genus of moths

Megacaphys is a monotypic snout moth genus containing the species Megacaphys titana. It was described by William Schaus in 1904, originally under the genus Caphys, and was subsequently moved to Megacaphys by George Hampson in 1916. It is found in Mexico.
