= Nachaba nyctalis =

Scientific classification
- Kingdom: Animalia
- Phylum: Arthropoda
- Class: Insecta
- Order: Lepidoptera
- Family: Pyralidae
- Genus: Nachaba
- Species: N. nyctalis

Binomial name
- Nachaba nyctalis Hampson, 1906

Synonyms
- Adenopteryx metallescens Dyar, 1914

Species of moth

Nachaba nyctalis is a species of snout moth in the genus Nachaba. It is found in South America and Panama.
