= Anassodes =

Scientific classification
- Kingdom: Animalia
- Phylum: Arthropoda
- Class: Insecta
- Order: Lepidoptera
- Family: Pyralidae
- Subfamily: Chrysauginae
- Genus: Anassodes; Turner, 1932
- Species: A. mesozonalis

Binomial name
- Anassodes mesozonalis (Hampson, 1917)

Synonyms
- Murgisca mesozonalis Hampson, 1917

Genus of moths

Anassodes is a monotypic snout moth genus. It was described by Alfred Jefferis Turner in 1932, and contains the species Anassodes mesozonalis. It is found in Australia, including the type location of Western Australia.
