= Cyclopalpia violescens =

Scientific classification
- Kingdom: Animalia
- Phylum: Arthropoda
- Class: Insecta
- Order: Lepidoptera
- Family: Pyralidae
- Genus: Cyclopalpia
- Species: C. violescens

Binomial name
- Cyclopalpia violescens Hampson, 1897

Species of moth

Cyclopalpia violescens is a species of snout moth in the genus Cyclopalpia. It was described by George Hampson 1897, and is known from the Brazilian state of São Paulo.
