= Lophopleura eurzonalis =

Scientific classification
- Domain: Eukaryota
- Kingdom: Animalia
- Phylum: Arthropoda
- Class: Insecta
- Order: Lepidoptera
- Family: Pyralidae
- Genus: Lophopleura
- Species: L. eurzonalis

Binomial name
- Lophopleura eurzonalis Hampson, 1897

Species of moth

Lophopleura eurzonalis is a species of snout moth. It was described by George Hampson in 1897. It is found in the Brazilian state of Amazonas.
