= Lophopleura xanthotaenialis =

Scientific classification
- Domain: Eukaryota
- Kingdom: Animalia
- Phylum: Arthropoda
- Class: Insecta
- Order: Lepidoptera
- Family: Pyralidae
- Genus: Lophopleura
- Species: L. xanthotaenialis

Binomial name
- Lophopleura xanthotaenialis Ragonot, 1891

Synonyms
- Dastira imitatrix Warren, 1891

Species of moth

Lophopleura xanthotaenialis is a species of snout moth. It was described by Émile Louis Ragonot in 1891. It is found in the Brazilian state of Amazonas.
