= Murgisca subductellus =

Scientific classification
- Domain: Eukaryota
- Kingdom: Animalia
- Phylum: Arthropoda
- Class: Insecta
- Order: Lepidoptera
- Family: Pyralidae
- Genus: Murgisca
- Species: M. subductellus

Binomial name
- Murgisca subductellus (Möschler, 1890)

Synonyms
- Pachymorphus subductellus Möschler, 1890

Species of moth

Murgisca subductellus is a species of snout moth in the genus Murgisca. It was described by Heinrich Benno Möschler in 1890, and is known from Puerto Rico.
