= Gephyra =

Scientific classification
- Kingdom: Animalia
- Phylum: Arthropoda
- Clade: Pancrustacea
- Class: Insecta
- Order: Lepidoptera
- Family: Pyralidae
- Subfamily: Chrysauginae
- Genus: Gephyra; Walker, 1859

Synonyms
- Replicia Dyar, 1914

Genus of moths

Gephyra is a genus of snout moths. It was described by Francis Walker in 1859.

== Species ==
- Gephyra cynisca (Druce, 1895)
- Gephyra getusalis Walker, 1859
- Gephyra pusilla (C. Felder, R. Felder & Rogenhofer, 1875)
- Gephyra saturatalis (Walker, 1859)
