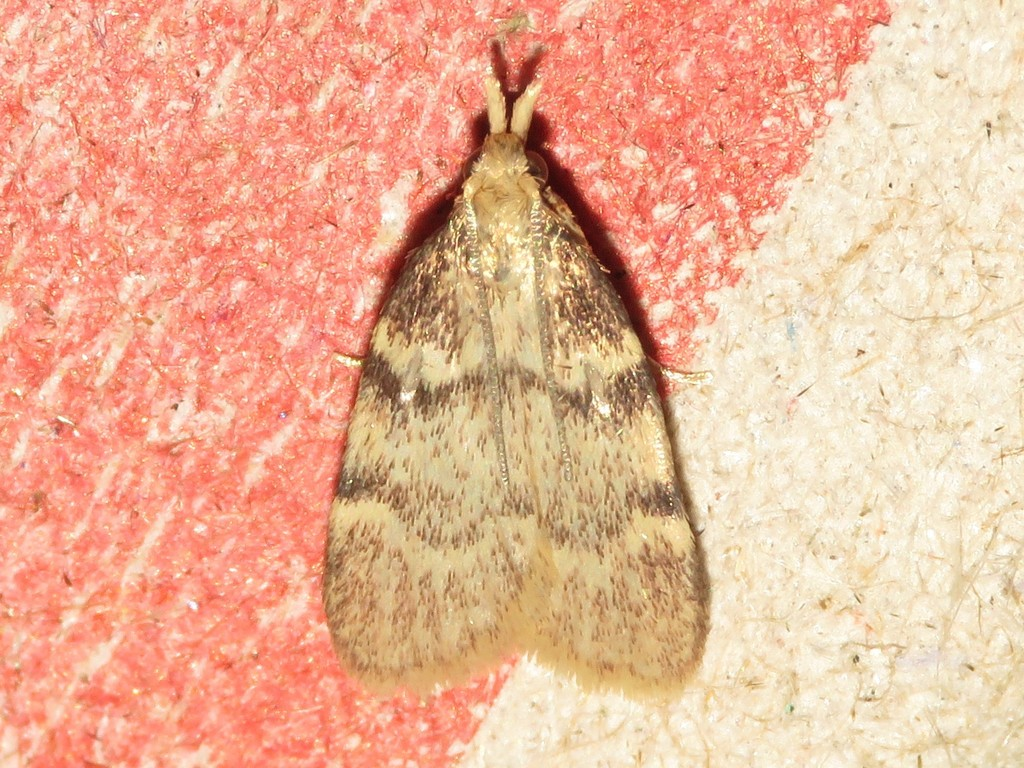

Scientific classification
- Domain: Eukaryota
- Kingdom: Animalia
- Phylum: Arthropoda
- Class: Insecta
- Order: Lepidoptera
- Family: Pyralidae
- Genus: Acallis
- Species: A. alticolalis

Binomial name
- Acallis alticolalis (Dyar, 1910)

Synonyms
- Polloccia alticolalis Dyar, 1910

= Acallis alticolalis =

Species of moth

Acallis alticolalis is a species of snout moth in the genus Acallis. It was described by Harrison Gray Dyar Jr. in 1910, and is known from North America, including New Hampshire and Virginia.
