= Arouva albivitta =

Scientific classification
- Domain: Eukaryota
- Kingdom: Animalia
- Phylum: Arthropoda
- Class: Insecta
- Order: Lepidoptera
- Family: Pyralidae
- Genus: Arouva
- Species: A. albivitta

Binomial name
- Arouva albivitta (C. Felder, R. Felder & Rogenhofer, 1875)

Synonyms
- Semnia albivitta C. Felder, R. Felder & Rogenhofer, 1875

Species of moth

Arouva albivitta is a species of snout moth in the genus Arouva. It was described by Cajetan Felder, Rudolf Felder and Alois Friedrich Rogenhofer in 1875, and is known from Brazil.
