= Nachaba diplagialis =

Scientific classification
- Kingdom: Animalia
- Phylum: Arthropoda
- Class: Insecta
- Order: Lepidoptera
- Family: Pyralidae
- Genus: Nachaba
- Species: N. diplagialis

Binomial name
- Nachaba diplagialis Hampson, 1906

Species of moth

Nachaba diplagialis is a species of snout moth in the genus Nachaba. It is found in South America.
