= Blepharocerus chilensis =

Scientific classification
- Kingdom: Animalia
- Phylum: Arthropoda
- Clade: Pancrustacea
- Class: Insecta
- Order: Lepidoptera
- Family: Pyralidae
- Genus: Blepharocerus
- Species: B. chilensis

Binomial name
- Blepharocerus chilensis Zeller, 1874

Synonyms
- Actenia rubescens Butler, 1883; Blepharocerus cinerosus Warren, 1891; Blepharocerus sabulosus Warren, 1891

Species of moth

Blepharocerus chilensis is a species of snout moth in the genus Blepharocerus. It was described by Philipp Christoph Zeller in 1874, and is known from Chile, from which its species epithet is derived.
