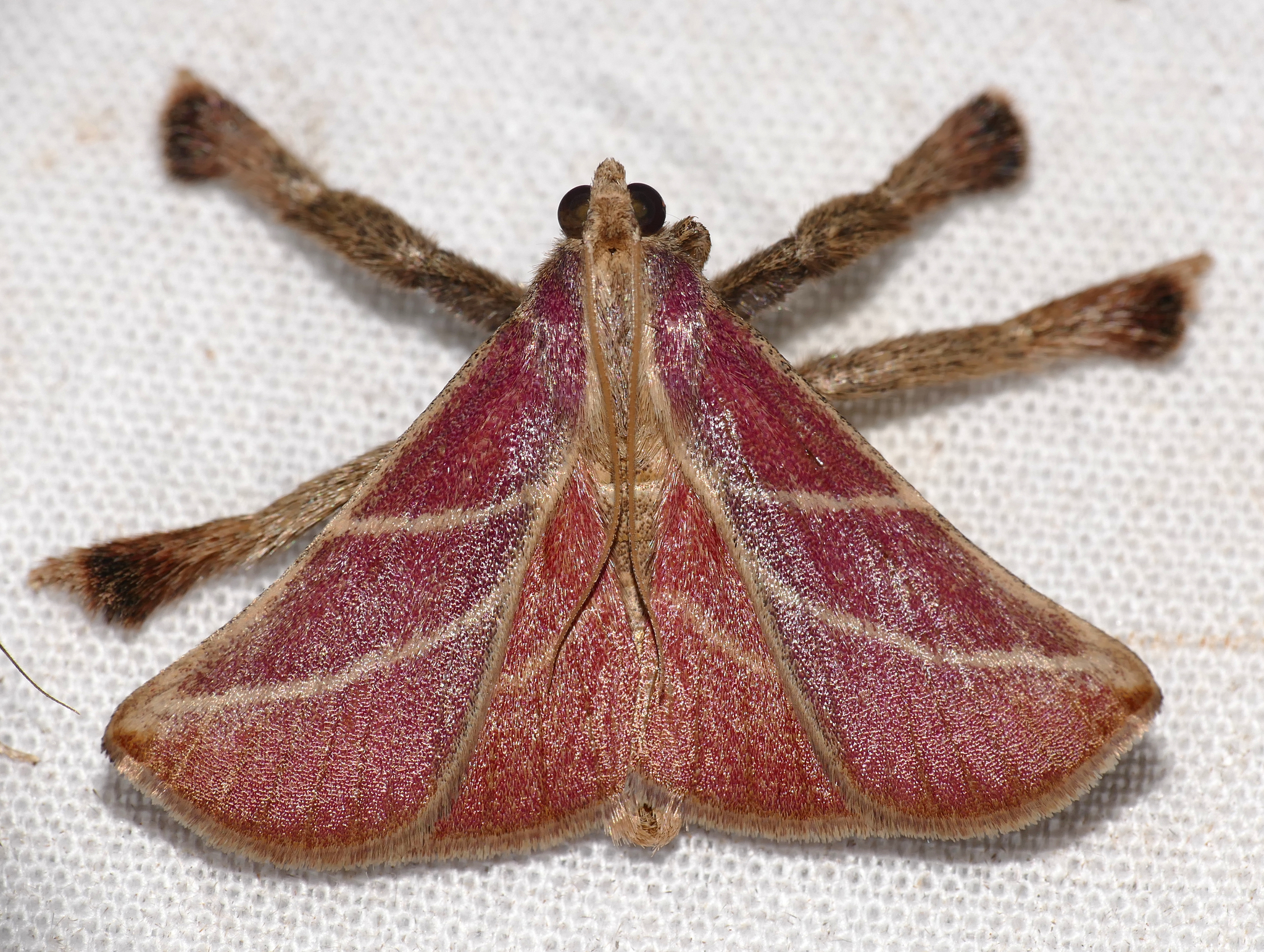
- In French Guiana

Scientific classification
- Kingdom: Animalia
- Phylum: Arthropoda
- Class: Insecta
- Order: Lepidoptera
- Family: Pyralidae
- Genus: Pachypodistes
- Species: P. goeldii

Binomial name
- Pachypodistes goeldii Hampson, 1905

= Pachypodistes goeldii =

Species of moth

Pachypodistes goeldii is a species of snout moth in the genus Pachypodistes. It was described by George Hampson in 1905 and is known from Brazil.
