= Cyclopalpia =

Scientific classification
- Kingdom: Animalia
- Phylum: Arthropoda
- Class: Insecta
- Order: Lepidoptera
- Family: Pyralidae
- Subfamily: Chrysauginae
- Genus: Cyclopalpia; Hampson, 1897

Genus of moths

Cyclopalpia is a genus of snout moths. It was described by George Hampson in 1897.

== Species ==
- Cyclopalpia monotonalis Dyar, 1914
- Cyclopalpia violescens Hampson, 1897
