= Abaera nactalis =

Scientific classification
- Kingdom: Animalia
- Phylum: Arthropoda
- Clade: Pancrustacea
- Class: Insecta
- Order: Lepidoptera
- Family: Pyralidae
- Genus: Abaera
- Species: A. nactalis

Binomial name
- Abaera nactalis Walker, 1859

Species of moth

Abaera nactalis is a species of snout moth in the genus Abaera. It was described by Francis Walker, in 1859, and is the type species of its genus. It is found in Brazil.

The larvae feed on Cordia panamensis.
