= Ocresia =

Scientific classification
- Domain: Eukaryota
- Kingdom: Animalia
- Phylum: Arthropoda
- Class: Insecta
- Order: Lepidoptera
- Family: Pyralidae
- Subfamily: Chrysauginae
- Genus: Ocresia; Ragonot, 1891

Genus of moths

Ocresia is a genus of snout moths. It was described by Émile Louis Ragonot in 1891.

== Species ==
- Ocresia bisinualis Ragonot, 1891
- Ocresia flammealis
- Ocresia pallidalis (Druce, 1902)
