= Holoperas oenochroalis =

Scientific classification
- Domain: Eukaryota
- Kingdom: Animalia
- Phylum: Arthropoda
- Class: Insecta
- Order: Lepidoptera
- Family: Pyralidae
- Genus: Holoperas
- Species: H. oenochroalis

Binomial name
- Holoperas oenochroalis Ragonot, 1890

Species of moth

Holoperas oenochroalis is a species of snout moth in the genus Holoperas. It was described by Émile Louis Ragonot in 1890. It is found in Venezuela.
