= Gephyra cynisca =

Scientific classification
- Domain: Eukaryota
- Kingdom: Animalia
- Phylum: Arthropoda
- Class: Insecta
- Order: Lepidoptera
- Family: Pyralidae
- Genus: Gephyra
- Species: G. cynisca

Binomial name
- Gephyra cynisca (H. Druce, 1895)

Synonyms
- Oectoperia cynisca H. Druce, 1895; Replicia inchoalis Dyar, 1914

Species of moth

Gephyra cynisca is a species of snout moth in the genus Gephyra. It was described by Herbert Druce in 1895, and is known from Mexico, Guatemala, and Panama.
