= Hyperparachma =

Scientific classification
- Domain: Eukaryota
- Kingdom: Animalia
- Phylum: Arthropoda
- Class: Insecta
- Order: Lepidoptera
- Family: Pyralidae
- Subfamily: Chrysauginae
- Genus: Hyperparachma; Warren, 1891

Synonyms
- Parachmopsis Amsel, 1956

Genus of moths

Hyperparachma is a genus of snout moths. It was described by William Warren in 1891.

== Species ==
- Hyperparachma bursarialis (Walker, 1866)
- Hyperparachma congrualis (Amsel, 1956)
