= Myolisa =

Scientific classification
- Kingdom: Animalia
- Phylum: Arthropoda
- Class: Insecta
- Order: Lepidoptera
- Family: Pyralidae
- Subfamily: Chrysauginae
- Genus: Myolisa; Dyar, 1914
- Species: M. chattinis

Binomial name
- Myolisa chattinis Dyar, 1914

Genus of moths

Myolisa is a monotypic snout moth genus. Its one species, Myolisa chattinis, was described by Harrison Gray Dyar Jr. in 1914. It is found in Mexico.
