= Anisothrix grenadensis =

Scientific classification
- Domain: Eukaryota
- Kingdom: Animalia
- Phylum: Arthropoda
- Class: Insecta
- Order: Lepidoptera
- Family: Pyralidae
- Genus: Anisothrix
- Species: A. grenadensis

Binomial name
- Anisothrix grenadensis Schaus, 1904

Species of moth

Anisothrix grenadensis is a species of snout moth in the genus Anisothrix. It was described by William Schaus, in 1904, and is known from Grenada, from which its species epithet is derived.

The wingspan is about 14 mm. The forewings are dark red, shaded with violaceous on the inner and outer margin. The outer half of the costal margin is yellow, partly irrorated with red. The hindwings are dark brown.
