= Arouva castanealis =

Scientific classification
- Kingdom: Animalia
- Phylum: Arthropoda
- Class: Insecta
- Order: Lepidoptera
- Family: Pyralidae
- Genus: Arouva
- Species: A. castanealis

Binomial name
- Arouva castanealis Hampson, 1906

Species of moth

Arouva castanealis is a species of snout moth in the genus Arouva. It was described by George Hampson in 1906 and is known from Trinidad.
