= Abaera chalcea =

Scientific classification
- Kingdom: Animalia
- Phylum: Arthropoda
- Class: Insecta
- Order: Lepidoptera
- Family: Pyralidae
- Genus: Abaera
- Species: A. chalcea

Binomial name
- Abaera chalcea Hampson, 1897

Species of moth

Abaera chalcea is a species of snout moth in the genus Abaera. It was described by George Hampson in 1897 and is known from Brazil.
