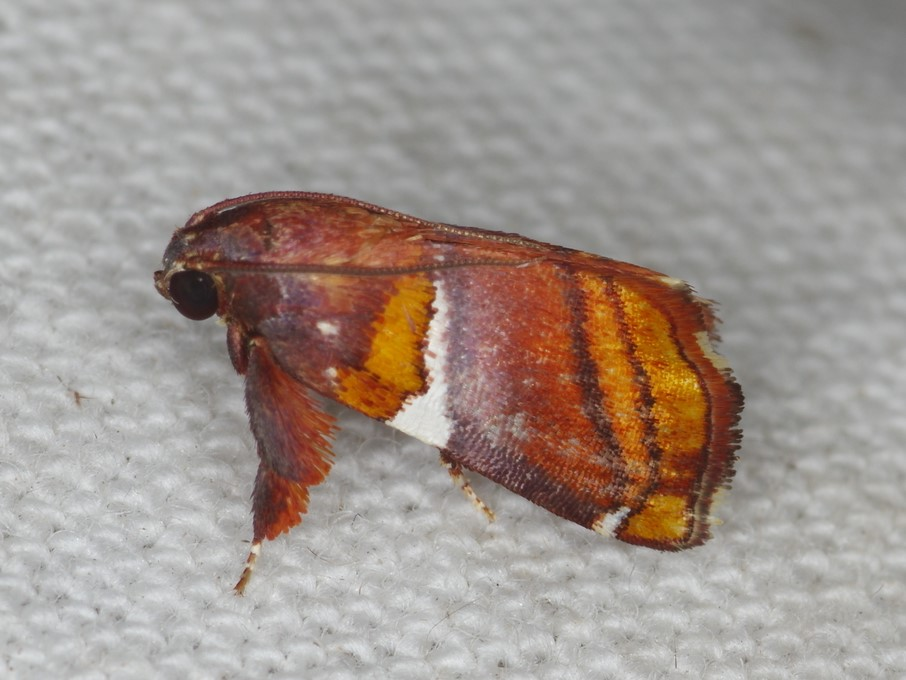

Scientific classification
- Domain: Eukaryota
- Kingdom: Animalia
- Phylum: Arthropoda
- Class: Insecta
- Order: Lepidoptera
- Family: Pyralidae
- Genus: Hypocosmia
- Species: H. floralis

Binomial name
- Hypocosmia floralis (Stoll in Cramer & Stoll, 1782)

Synonyms
- Phalaena floralis Stoll in Cramer & Stoll, 1782

= Hypocosmia floralis =

Species of moth

Hypocosmia floralis is a species of snout moth. It was first described by Stoll in 1782, and is known from Suriname.
