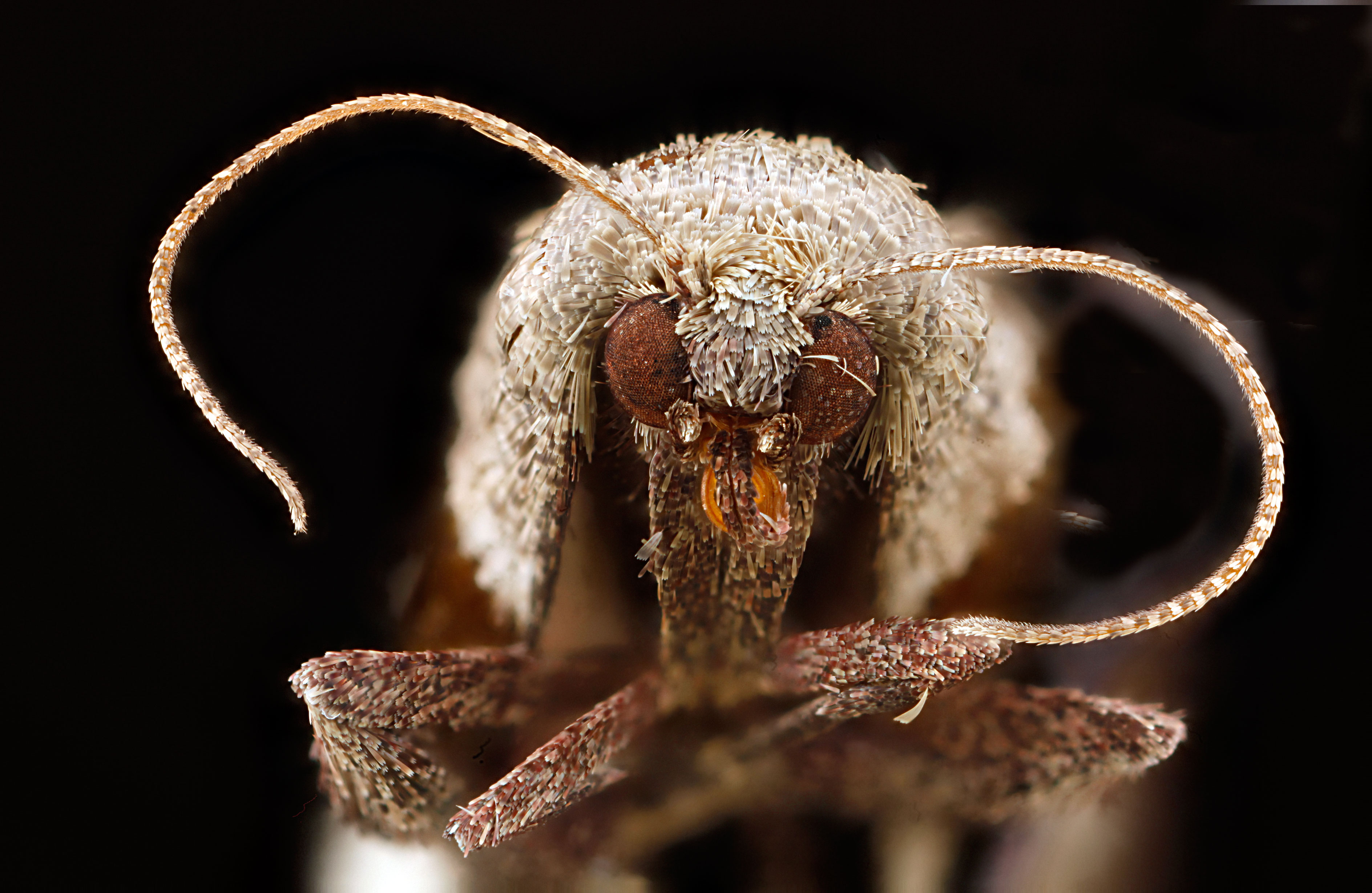

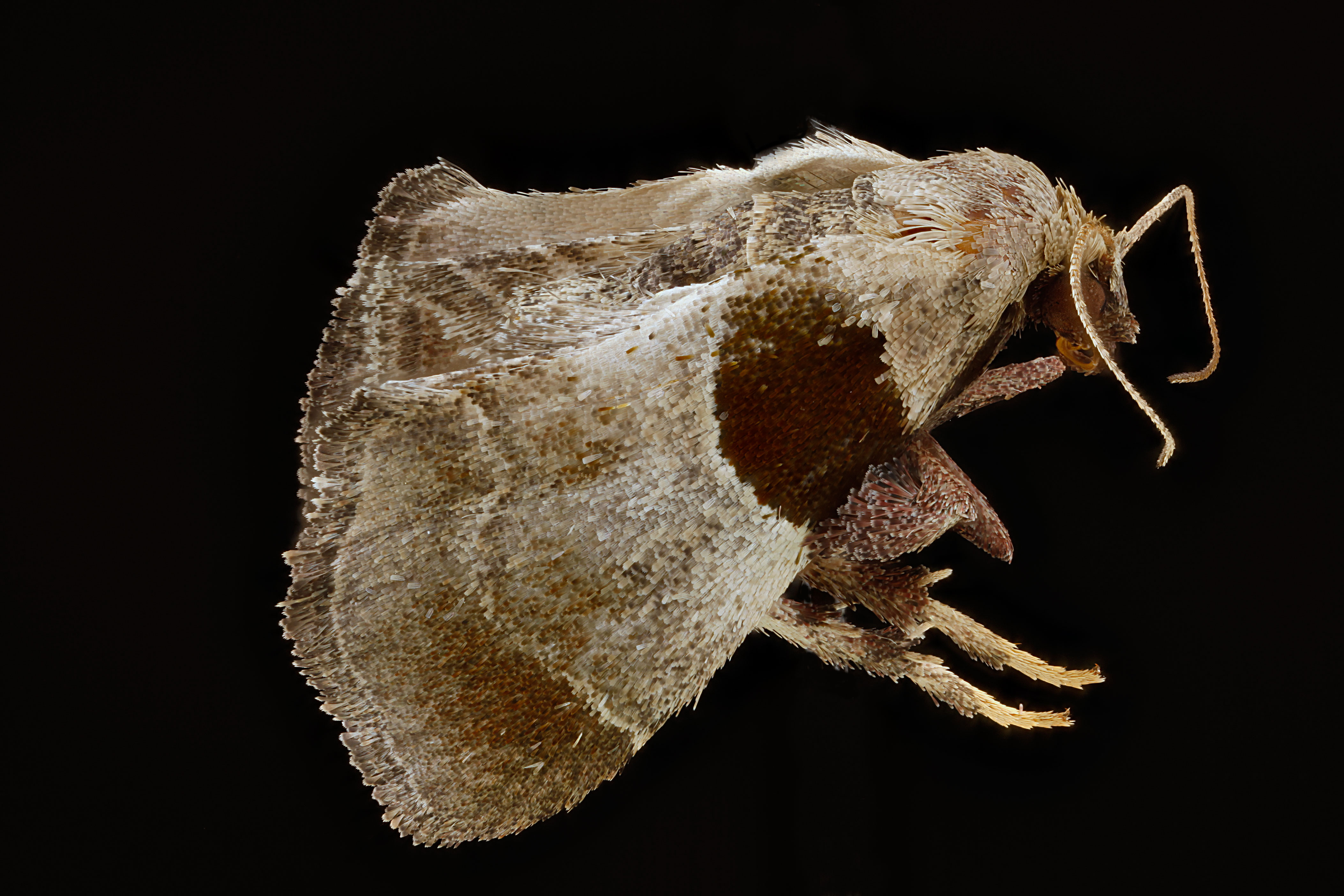

Scientific classification
- Kingdom: Animalia
- Phylum: Arthropoda
- Class: Insecta
- Order: Lepidoptera
- Family: Pyralidae
- Genus: Tosale
- Species: T. oviplagalis

Binomial name
- Tosale oviplagalis (Walker, 1866)

Synonyms
- Fabatana oviplagalis Walker, 1866; Asopia anthoecioides Grote & Robinson, 1867; Siparocera nobilis Grote, 1875

= Tosale oviplagalis =

Species of moth

Tosale oviplagalis, the dimorphic tosale moth, is a moth of the family Pyralidae.

== Geography ==
It is found from eastern North America (from New York to Florida and west to Illinois and Texas) south to Colombia and Peru.

== Reproduction ==
Adults are sexually dimorphic.

== Description ==
Adults are on wing from May to September.
