= Idnea concolorana =

Scientific classification
- Kingdom: Animalia
- Phylum: Arthropoda
- Class: Insecta
- Order: Lepidoptera
- Family: Pyralidae
- Genus: Idnea
- Species: I. concolorana

Binomial name
- Idnea concolorana (Walker, 1863)

Synonyms
- Torda concolarana Walker, 1863; Uzeda torquetana Walker, 1863; Auchoteles perforatana Zeller, 1877; Auchoteles sobriana Zeller, 1877

Species of moth

Idnea concolorana is a species of snout moth in the genus Idnea. It was described by Francis Walker in 1863, and is from Brazil.
