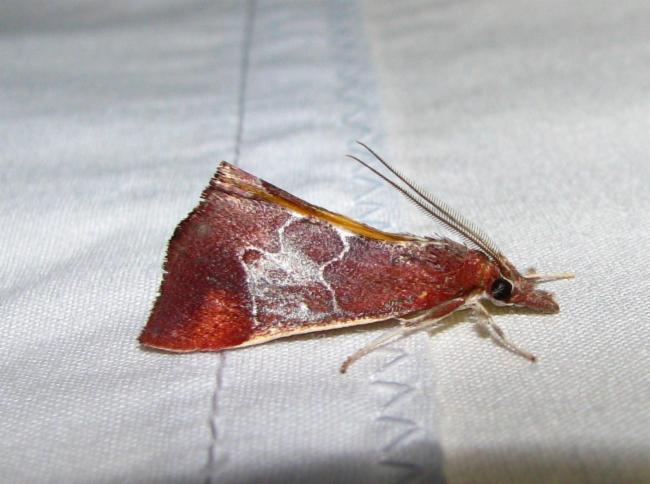

Scientific classification
- Kingdom: Animalia
- Phylum: Arthropoda
- Class: Insecta
- Order: Lepidoptera
- Family: Pyralidae
- Genus: Anemosa
- Species: A. exanthes

Binomial name
- Anemosa exanthes (Meyrick, 1885)

Synonyms
- Drymiarcha exanthes Meyrick, 1885

= Anemosa exanthes =

Species of moth

Anemosa exanthes is a species of snout moth in the genus Anemosa. It was described by Edward Meyrick in 1885, and is known from Australia.
