= Carcha hersilialis =

Scientific classification
- Kingdom: Animalia
- Phylum: Arthropoda
- Class: Insecta
- Order: Lepidoptera
- Family: Pyralidae
- Genus: Carcha
- Species: C. hersilialis

Binomial name
- Carcha hersilialis Walker, 1859

Synonyms
- Coeloma torticalis Möschler, 1890; Pyralis curtalis Walker, 1886; Pyralis dispansalis Walker, 1866; Thalpochares basalis Moeschler, 1890; Tosale moritzi Ragonot, 1891

Species of moth

Carcha hersilialis is a species of snout moth in the genus Carcha. It was described by Francis Walker in 1859, and is known from the Dominican Republic and Puerto Rico, as well as the greater and lesser Antilles.
