= Monoloxis =

Scientific classification
- Kingdom: Animalia
- Phylum: Arthropoda
- Class: Insecta
- Order: Lepidoptera
- Family: Pyralidae
- Subfamily: Chrysauginae
- Genus: Monoloxis; Hampson, 1897

Genus of moths

Monoloxis is a genus of snout moths. It was described by George Hampson in 1897.

== Species ==
- Monoloxis cinerascens (Warren, 1891)
- Monoloxis flavicinctalis (Sepp, 1852)
- Monoloxis graphitalis (C. Felder, R. Felder & Rogenhofer, 1875)
