= Idnea felicella =

Scientific classification
- Kingdom: Animalia
- Phylum: Arthropoda
- Class: Insecta
- Order: Lepidoptera
- Family: Pyralidae
- Genus: Idnea
- Species: I. felicella

Binomial name
- Idnea felicella Dyar, 1913

Species of moth

Idnea felicella is a species of snout moth in the genus Idnea. It was described by Harrison Gray Dyar Jr. in 1913, and is known from Guyana.
