= Chrysophila =

Scientific classification
- Kingdom: Animalia
- Phylum: Arthropoda
- Clade: Pancrustacea
- Class: Insecta
- Order: Lepidoptera
- Family: Pyralidae
- Subfamily: Chrysauginae
- Genus: Chrysophila; Hübner, 1831

Synonyms
- Eurypta Lederer, 1863

Genus of moths

Chrysophila is a genus of snout moths. It was described by Jacob Hübner in 1831.

== Species ==
- Chrysophila auriscutalis (Hübner, [1831])
- Chrysophila atridorsalis (Ragonot, 1891)
