= Cappsia =

Scientific classification
- Kingdom: Animalia
- Phylum: Arthropoda
- Class: Insecta
- Order: Lepidoptera
- Family: Pyralidae
- Subfamily: Chrysauginae
- Genus: Cappsia; Pastrana, 1953
- Species: C. bourquini

Binomial name
- Cappsia bourquini Pastrana, 1953

Genus of moths

Cappsia is a genus of snout moths. It was described by José A. Pastrana in 1953 and contains the species Cappsia bourquini. It is found in Argentina.
