= Distortia =

Scientific classification
- Kingdom: Animalia
- Phylum: Arthropoda
- Class: Insecta
- Order: Lepidoptera
- Family: Pyralidae
- Subfamily: Chrysauginae
- Genus: Distortia; Amsel, 1956
- Species: D. minimalis

Binomial name
- Distortia minimalis Amsel, 1956

Genus of moths

Distortia is a monotypic snout moth genus. It was described by Hans Georg Amsel in 1956, and contains the species Distortia minimalis. It is found in Venezuela.
