= Galasodes =

Scientific classification
- Kingdom: Animalia
- Phylum: Arthropoda
- Class: Insecta
- Order: Lepidoptera
- Family: Pyralidae
- Subfamily: Chrysauginae
- Genus: Galasodes; Amsel, 1956
- Species: G. nervosella

Binomial name
- Galasodes nervosella Amsel, 1956

Genus of moths

Galasodes is a monotypic snout moth genus described by Hans Georg Amsel in 1956. Its only species, Galasodes nervosella, described by the same author, is found in Venezuela.
