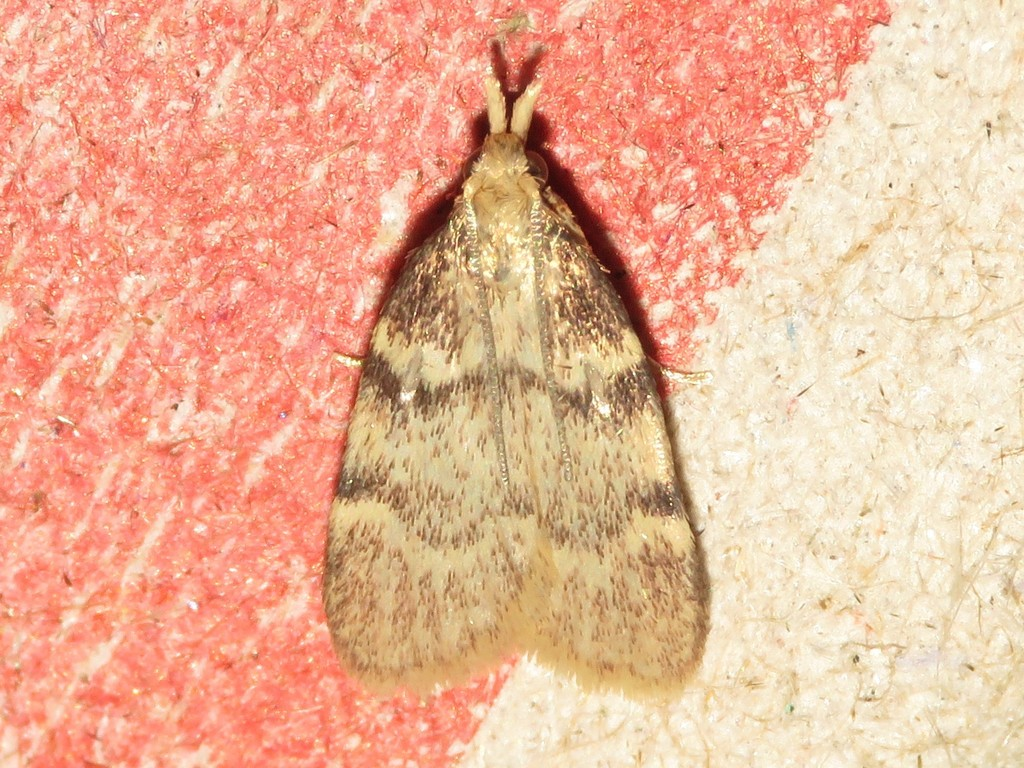
- Acallis alticolalis

Scientific classification
- Kingdom: Animalia
- Phylum: Arthropoda
- Clade: Pancrustacea
- Class: Insecta
- Order: Lepidoptera
- Family: Pyralidae
- Subfamily: Chrysauginae
- Genus: Acallis; Ragonot, 1891

Synonyms
- Polloccia Dyar, 1910; Pollocia Neave, 1940

= Acallis =

Genus of moths

Acallis is a genus of moths of the family Pyralidae.

== Species ==
- Acallis alticolalis (Dyar, 1910)
- Acallis amblytalis (Dyar, 1914)
- Acallis gripalis (Hulst, 1886)
- Acallis xantippe (Dyar, 1914)
