= Carcha =

Scientific classification
- Kingdom: Animalia
- Phylum: Arthropoda
- Class: Insecta
- Order: Lepidoptera
- Family: Pyralidae
- Subfamily: Chrysauginae
- Genus: Carcha; Walker, 1859

Synonyms
- Coeloma Möschler, 1890

Genus of insects

Carcha is a genus of snout moths. It was described by Francis Walker in 1859, and is known from the Dominican Republic and Venezuela.

== Species ==
- Carcha hersilialis Walker, 1859
- Carcha undulatalis Amsel, 1956
- Carcha violalis Hampson, 1897
