= Cyclopalpia monotonalis =

Scientific classification
- Kingdom: Animalia
- Phylum: Arthropoda
- Class: Insecta
- Order: Lepidoptera
- Family: Pyralidae
- Genus: Cyclopalpia
- Species: C. monotonalis

Binomial name
- Cyclopalpia monotonalis Dyar, 1914

Species of moth

Cyclopalpia monotonalis is a species of snout moth in the genus Cyclopalpia. It was described by Harrison Gray Dyar Jr. in 1914. It is found in Panama.
