= Michaelshaffera beckeri =

Scientific classification
- Kingdom: Animalia
- Phylum: Arthropoda
- Clade: Pancrustacea
- Class: Insecta
- Order: Lepidoptera
- Family: Pyralidae
- Genus: Michaelshaffera
- Species: M. beckeri

Binomial name
- Michaelshaffera beckeri Solis, 1998

Species of moth

Michaelshaffera beckeri is a species of snout moth in the genus Michaelshaffera. It was described by Solis in 1998, and is known from Brazil.
