= Area diaphanalis =

Scientific classification
- Kingdom: Animalia
- Phylum: Arthropoda
- Clade: Pancrustacea
- Class: Insecta
- Order: Lepidoptera
- Family: Pyralidae
- Subfamily: Chrysauginae
- Genus: Area; Ragonot, 1891
- Species: A. diaphanalis

Binomial name
- Area diaphanalis Ragonot, 1891

Species of moth

Area is a monotypic snout moth genus. It was described by Émile Louis Ragonot in 1891, and contains the species Area diaphanalis. It is found in Argentina (it was described from Goya).
