= Derbeta =

Scientific classification
- Kingdom: Animalia
- Phylum: Arthropoda
- Class: Insecta
- Order: Lepidoptera
- Family: Pyralidae
- Subfamily: Chrysauginae
- Genus: Derbeta; Walker, 1866
- Species: D. nigrifimbria

Binomial name
- Derbeta nigrifimbria Walker, [1866]

Genus of moths

Derbeta is a genus of snout moths. It was described by Francis Walker in 1866, and contains the species Derbeta nigrifimbria. It is found in Brazil.
