= Ocresia pallidalis =

Scientific classification
- Domain: Eukaryota
- Kingdom: Animalia
- Phylum: Arthropoda
- Class: Insecta
- Order: Lepidoptera
- Family: Pyralidae
- Genus: Ocresia
- Species: O. pallidalis

Binomial name
- Ocresia pallidalis (H. Druce, 1902)

Synonyms
- Saccopleura pallidalis H. Druce, 1902

Species of moth

Ocresia pallidalis is a species of snout moth, and the type species of the genus Ocresia. It was described by Herbert Druce in 1902. It is found in Costa Rica.
