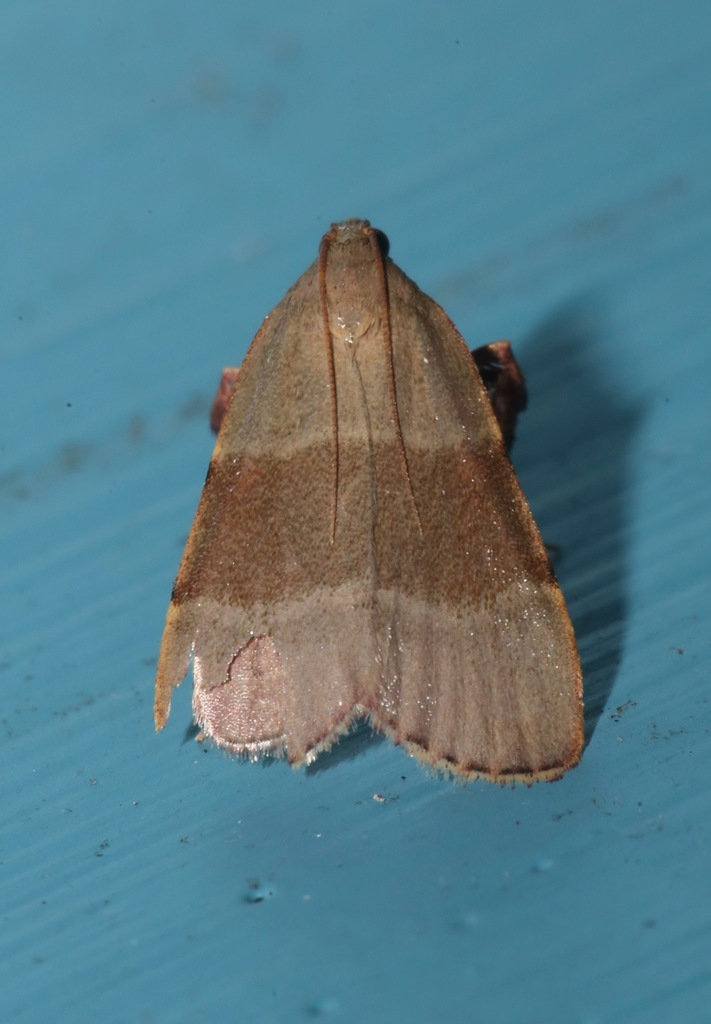

Scientific classification
- Kingdom: Animalia
- Phylum: Arthropoda
- Class: Insecta
- Order: Lepidoptera
- Family: Pyralidae
- Subfamily: Chrysauginae
- Genus: Basacallis; Cashatt, 1969
- Species: B. tarachodes

Binomial name
- Basacallis tarachodes (Dyar, 1914)

Synonyms
- Parachma tarachodes Dyar, 1914

= Basacallis =

Genus of moths

Basacallis is a monotypic snout moth genus. It was described by Everett D. Cashatt in 1969, and contains the species Basacallis tarachodes. It is found in Panama, Florida, Mississippi, Alabama, and South Carolina.

The wingspan is 16–23 mm. The forewings are light gray.
