= Nachaba =

Scientific classification
- Kingdom: Animalia
- Phylum: Arthropoda
- Class: Insecta
- Order: Lepidoptera
- Family: Pyralidae
- Subfamily: Chrysauginae
- Genus: Nachaba; Walker, 1859

Synonyms
- Ascha Walker, 1864

Genus of moths

Nachaba is a genus of snout moths. It was described by Francis Walker in 1859.

== Species ==
- Nachaba auritalis Walker, 1859
- Nachaba congrualis Walker, 1859
- Nachaba diplagialis
- Nachaba flavisparsalis Warren, 1891
- Nachaba fluella
- Nachaba funerea (C. Felder, R. Felder & Rogenhofer, 1875)
- Nachaba nyctalis
- Nachaba oppositalis Walker, 1859
- Nachaba reconditana (Walker, 1864)
- Nachaba tryphaenalis C. Felder, R. Felder & Rogenhofer, 1875)
