= Abaera aurofusalis =

Scientific classification
- Kingdom: Animalia
- Phylum: Arthropoda
- Class: Insecta
- Order: Lepidoptera
- Family: Pyralidae
- Genus: Abaera
- Species: A. aurofusalis

Binomial name
- Abaera aurofusalis Hampson, 1906

Species of moth

Abaera aurofusalis is a species of snout moth in the genus Abaera. It was described by George Hampson in 1906 and is known from Brazil.
