= Monoloxis cinerascens =

Scientific classification
- Domain: Eukaryota
- Kingdom: Animalia
- Phylum: Arthropoda
- Class: Insecta
- Order: Lepidoptera
- Family: Pyralidae
- Genus: Monoloxis
- Species: M. cinerascens

Binomial name
- Monoloxis cinerascens (Warren, 1891)

Synonyms
- Nachaba cinerascens Warren, 1891

Species of moth

Monoloxis cinerascens is a species of snout moth, and the type species in the genus Monoloxis. It was described by Warren in 1891, and is known from Brazil.
