= Gephyra pusilla =

Scientific classification
- Domain: Eukaryota
- Kingdom: Animalia
- Phylum: Arthropoda
- Class: Insecta
- Order: Lepidoptera
- Family: Pyralidae
- Genus: Gephyra
- Species: G. pusilla

Binomial name
- Gephyra pusilla (C. Felder, R. Felder & Rogenhofer, 1875)

Synonyms
- Tamyra pusilla Felder & Rogenhofer, 1875

Species of moth

Gephyra pusilla is a species of snout moth in the genus Gephyra. It was described by Cajetan Felder, Rudolf Felder and Alois Friedrich Rogenhofer in 1875 and is known from Brazil.
