= Bisinusia =

Scientific classification
- Kingdom: Animalia
- Phylum: Arthropoda
- Class: Insecta
- Order: Lepidoptera
- Family: Pyralidae
- Subfamily: Chrysauginae
- Genus: Bisinusia; Amsel, 1956
- Species: B. palmipes

Binomial name
- Bisinusia palmipes (Felder, Felder & Rogenhofer, 1875)

Synonyms
- Amblyura palmipes Felder & Rogenhofer, 1875; Galasa palmipes

Genus of moths

Bisinusia is a monotypic snout moth genus described by Hans Georg Amsel in 1956. Its single species, Bisinusia palmipes, was described by Cajetan Felder, Rudolf Felder and Alois Friedrich Rogenhofer in 1875. It is found in South America, including Amazonas and Venezuela.
