= Oryctopleura =

Scientific classification
- Kingdom: Animalia
- Phylum: Arthropoda
- Class: Insecta
- Order: Lepidoptera
- Family: Pyralidae
- Subfamily: Chrysauginae
- Genus: Oryctopleura; Ragonot, 1891
- Species: O. arcuatalis

Binomial name
- Oryctopleura arcuatalis Ragonot, 1891

Genus of moths

Oryctopleura is a monotypic snout moth genus. Its only species, Oryctopleura arcuatalis, was described by Émile Louis Ragonot in 1891. It is found in Brazil.
