= Deopteryx =

Scientific classification
- Kingdom: Animalia
- Phylum: Arthropoda
- Clade: Pancrustacea
- Class: Insecta
- Order: Lepidoptera
- Family: Pyralidae
- Subfamily: Chrysauginae
- Genus: Deopteryx; Dyar, 1914
- Species: D. hypenetes

Binomial name
- Deopteryx hypenetes Dyar, 1914

Genus of moths

Deopteryx is a genus of snout moths. It was described by Harrison Gray Dyar Jr. in 1914, and contains the species Deopteryx hypenetes. It is found in Panama.
