= Casuaria crumena =

Scientific classification
- Domain: Eukaryota
- Kingdom: Animalia
- Phylum: Arthropoda
- Class: Insecta
- Order: Lepidoptera
- Family: Pyralidae
- Genus: Casuaria
- Species: C. crumena

Binomial name
- Casuaria crumena (C. Felder, R. Felder & Rogenhofer, 1875)

Synonyms
- Tamyra crumena Felder & Rogenhofer, 1875

Species of moth

Casuaria crumena is a species of snout moth in the genus Casuaria. It was described by Cajetan Felder, Rudolf Felder and Alois Friedrich Rogenhofer in 1875, and is known from Colombia.
