= Hypocosmia rectilinealis =

Scientific classification
- Domain: Eukaryota
- Kingdom: Animalia
- Phylum: Arthropoda
- Class: Insecta
- Order: Lepidoptera
- Family: Pyralidae
- Genus: Hypocosmia
- Species: H. rectilinealis

Binomial name
- Hypocosmia rectilinealis Dyar, 1914

Species of moth

Hypocosmia rectilinealis is a species of snout moth in the genus Hypocosmia. It was described by Harrison Gray Dyar Jr. in 1914, and is known from Panama.
