= Idnea =

Scientific classification
- Domain: Eukaryota
- Kingdom: Animalia
- Phylum: Arthropoda
- Class: Insecta
- Order: Lepidoptera
- Family: Pyralidae
- Subfamily: Chrysauginae
- Genus: Idnea; Herrich-Schäffer, 1858

Synonyms
- Auchoteles Zeller, 1877; Corybissa Walker, 1863; Uzeda Walker, 1863

Genus of moths

Idnea is a genus of snout moths. It was described by Gottlieb August Wilhelm Herrich-Schäffer in 1858.

== Species ==
- Idnea altana (Walker, 1863)
- Idnea concolorana (Walker, 1863)
- Idnea felicella Dyar, 1913
- Idnea propriana (Walker, 1863)
- Idnea speculans Herrich-Schäffer, [1858]
