= Chrysophila auriscutalis =

Scientific classification
- Kingdom: Animalia
- Phylum: Arthropoda
- Clade: Pancrustacea
- Class: Insecta
- Order: Lepidoptera
- Family: Pyralidae
- Genus: Chrysophila
- Species: C. auriscutalis

Binomial name
- Chrysophila auriscutalis (Hübner, [1831])

Synonyms
- Chrysohila auriscutalis Hübner, [1831]

Species of moth

Chrysophila auriscutalis is a species of snout moth. It was described by Jacob Hübner in 1831. It is found in Brazilian state of Rio de Janeiro.
