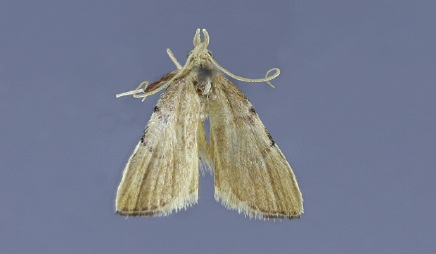

Scientific classification
- Domain: Eukaryota
- Kingdom: Animalia
- Phylum: Arthropoda
- Class: Insecta
- Order: Lepidoptera
- Family: Pyralidae
- Subfamily: Chrysauginae
- Genus: Paragalasa; Cashatt in Solis, Cashatt & Scholtens, 2012
- Species: P. exospinalis

Binomial name
- Paragalasa exospinalis Cashatt in Solis, Cashatt & Scholtens, 2012

= Paragalasa =

Genus of moths

Paragalasa is a genus of moths of the family Pyralidae. It contains only one species, Paragalasa exospinalis, which is found in Arizona.

The wingspan is 19–22 mm. The forewings are pale reddish-ochreous, the costa irrorated with fuscous, especially at the base and at the origin of the antemedial and postmedial lines. The hindwings are light pinkish to brownish-white with a darker terminal line.
