= Nachaba fluella =

Scientific classification
- Domain: Eukaryota
- Kingdom: Animalia
- Phylum: Arthropoda
- Class: Insecta
- Order: Lepidoptera
- Family: Pyralidae
- Genus: Nachaba
- Species: N. fluella

Binomial name
- Nachaba fluella Schaus, 1904

Species of moth

Nachaba fluella is a species of snout moth in the genus Nachaba. It is found in South America.
