= Murgisca =

Scientific classification
- Kingdom: Animalia
- Phylum: Arthropoda
- Class: Insecta
- Order: Lepidoptera
- Family: Pyralidae
- Subfamily: Chrysauginae
- Genus: Murgisca; Walker, 1863

Synonyms
- Pachymorphus Möschler, 1890

Genus of moths

Murgisca is a genus of snout moths. It was described by Francis Walker in 1863.

== Species ==
- Murgisca cervinalis Walker, 1863
- Murgisca diplommatalis Dyar, 1914
- Murgisca pyrophoralis
- Murgisca subductellus (Möschler, 1890)
