= Navura =

Scientific classification
- Kingdom: Animalia
- Phylum: Arthropoda
- Class: Insecta
- Order: Lepidoptera
- Family: Pyralidae
- Subfamily: Chrysauginae
- Genus: Navura; Schaus, 1913
- Species: N. lobata

Binomial name
- Navura lobata Schaus, 1913

Synonyms
- Pelasgis geromalis Dyar, 1914

Genus of moths

Navura is a monotypic snout moth genus. Its one species, Navura lobata, was described by William Schaus in 1913. It is found in Costa Rica and Panama.
