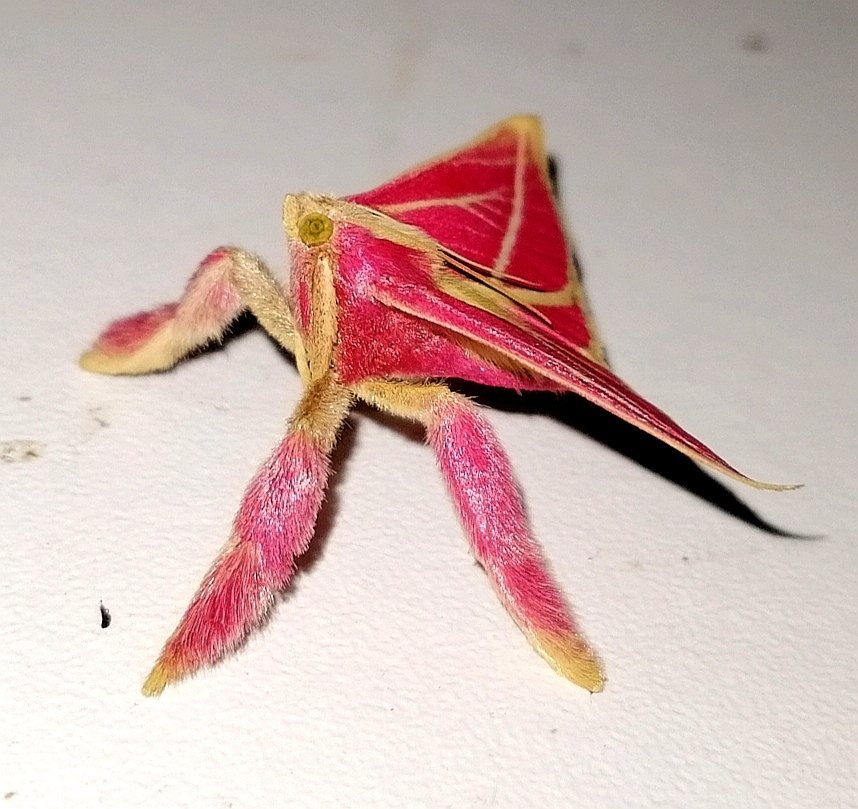
- Pachypodistes angulata

Scientific classification
- Kingdom: Animalia
- Phylum: Arthropoda
- Class: Insecta
- Order: Lepidoptera
- Family: Pyralidae
- Subfamily: Chrysauginae
- Genus: Pachypodistes; Hampson, 1905

Synonyms
- Conotambe Dyar, 1914

= Pachypodistes =

Genus of moths

Pachypodistes is a genus of snout moths. It was described by George Hampson in 1905.

== Species ==
Image	Species
	Pachypodistes angulata Hampson, 1916
	Pachypodistes goeldii Hampson, 1905
	Pachypodistes paralysisalis (Dyar, 1914)
	Pachypodistes sthenistis Hampson, 1916
