= Nachaba oppositalis =

Scientific classification
- Kingdom: Animalia
- Phylum: Arthropoda
- Class: Insecta
- Order: Lepidoptera
- Family: Pyralidae
- Genus: Nachaba
- Species: N. oppositalis

Binomial name
- Nachaba oppositalis Walker, 1859

Species of moth

Nachaba oppositalis is a species of snout moth in the genus Nachaba. It was described by Francis Walker in 1859, and is known from Rio de Janeiro, Brazil.
