= Chrysophila atridorsalis =

Scientific classification
- Domain: Eukaryota
- Kingdom: Animalia
- Phylum: Arthropoda
- Class: Insecta
- Order: Lepidoptera
- Family: Pyralidae
- Genus: Chrysophila
- Species: C. atridorsalis

Binomial name
- Chrysophila atridorsalis (Ragonot, 1891)

Synonyms
- Eurypta atridorsalis Ragonot, 1891

Species of moth

Chrysophila atridorsalis is a species of snout moth. It was described by Émile Louis Ragonot in 1891. It is found in the Brazilian state of Espírito Santo.
