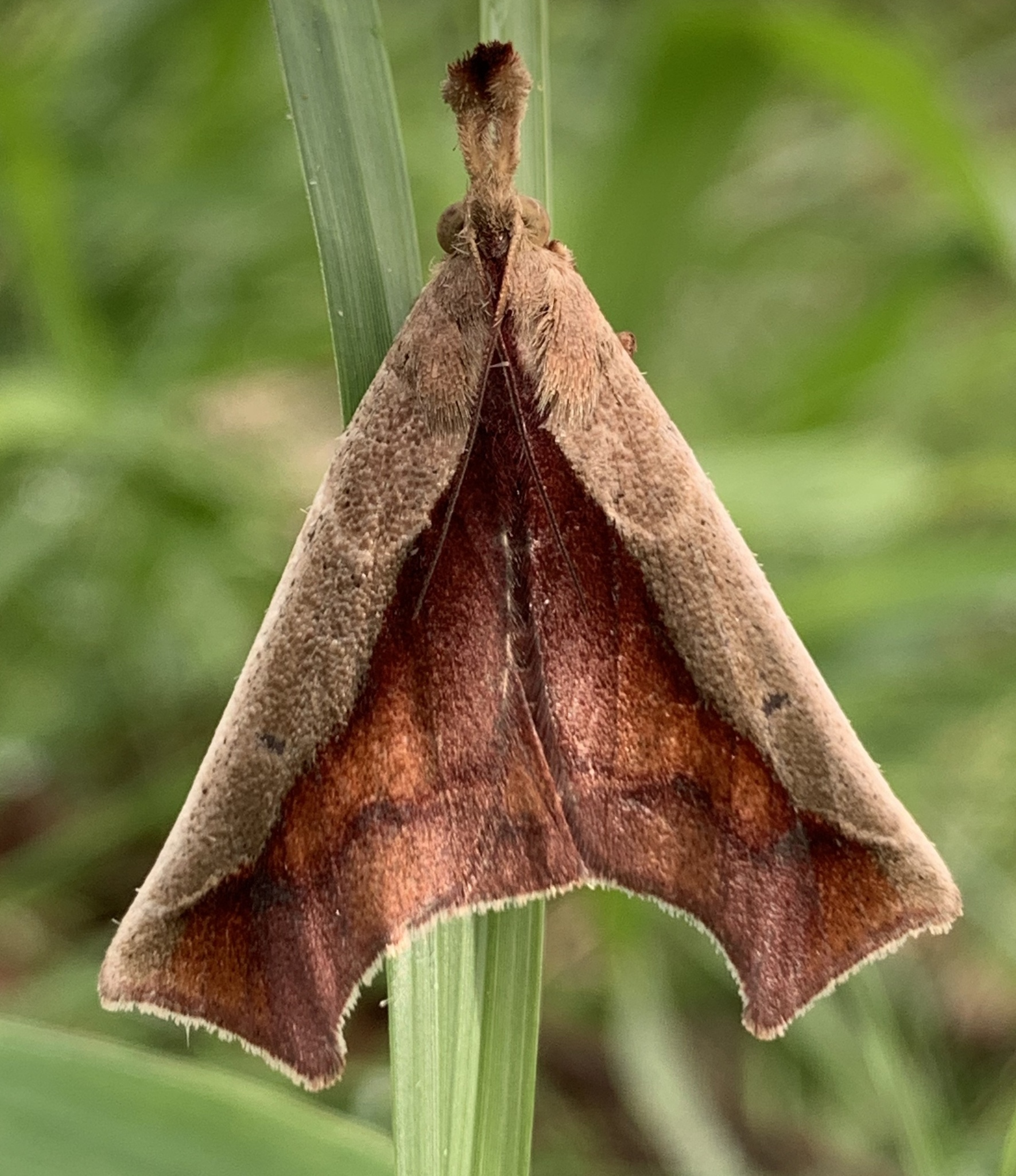

Scientific classification
- Domain: Eukaryota
- Kingdom: Animalia
- Phylum: Arthropoda
- Class: Insecta
- Order: Lepidoptera
- Family: Pyralidae
- Genus: Arbinia; Möschler, 1881
- Species: A. todilla

Binomial name
- Arbinia todilla Möschler, 1880

Synonyms
- Tamyra klagesi Druce, 1910

= Arbinia =

Genus of moths

Arbinia is a genus of snout moths. It was described by Heinrich Benno Möschler, in 1881, and contains the species Arbinia todilla. It is found in Suriname.

The wingspan is about 45.8 mm.
