= Anisothrix (moth) =

Scientific classification
- Kingdom: Animalia
- Phylum: Arthropoda
- Class: Insecta
- Order: Lepidoptera
- Family: Pyralidae
- Subfamily: Chrysauginae
- Genus: Anisothrix; Ragonot, 1891

Genus of moths

Anisothrix is a genus of snout moths. It was described by Émile Louis Ragonot in 1891.

== Species ==
- Anisothrix adustalis Ragonot, 1891
- Anisothrix agamalis (Hampson, 1906)
- Anisothrix grenadensis Schaus, 1904
