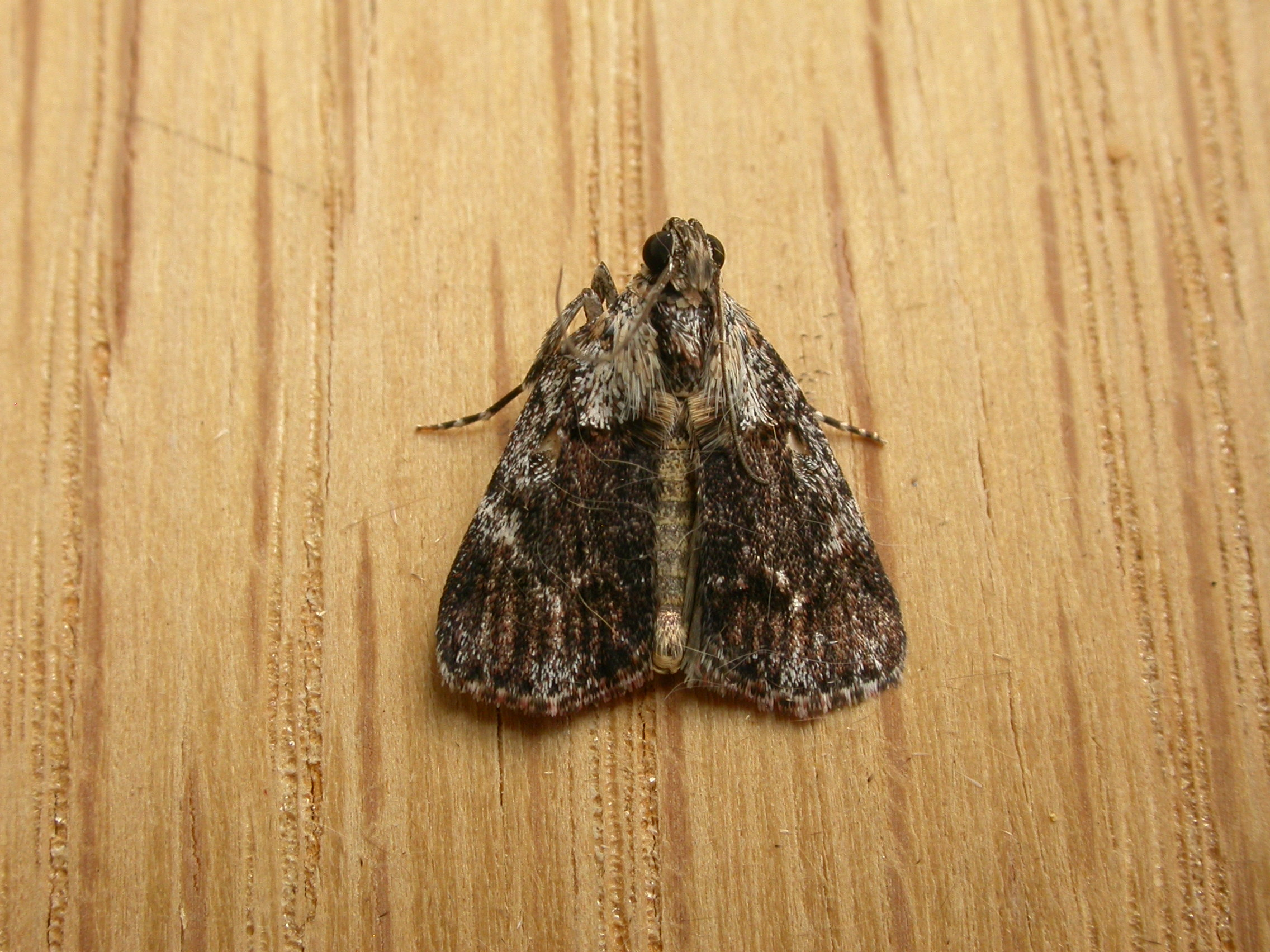

Scientific classification
- Kingdom: Animalia
- Phylum: Arthropoda
- Class: Insecta
- Order: Lepidoptera
- Family: Pyralidae
- Subfamily: Epipaschiinae
- Genus: Spectrotrota; Warren, 1891
- Species: S. fimbrialis

Binomial name
- Spectrotrota fimbrialis Warren, 1891

= Spectrotrota =

Genus of moths

Spectrotrota is a monotypic genus of moths in the family Pyralidae. Its sole species, Spectrotrota fimbrialis, is found in Australia.

The genus formerly also included Spectrotrota normalis, which is now considered to belong to the genus Araeopaschia instead.
