= Chloropaschia godrica =

Scientific classification
- Kingdom: Animalia
- Phylum: Arthropoda
- Clade: Pancrustacea
- Class: Insecta
- Order: Lepidoptera
- Family: Pyralidae
- Genus: Chloropaschia
- Species: C. godrica

Binomial name
- Chloropaschia godrica Schaus, 1934

Species of moth

Chloropaschia godrica is a species of moth in the family Pyralidae and subfamily Epipaschiinae. It was described by the American entomologist William Schaus in 1934. The species has been reported from the Amazon region of South America.

== Taxonomy ==
The genus Chloropaschia was established by George Hampson in 1906. Its type species is Chloropaschia thermalis, also described by Hampson in 1906, and fixed as the type by monotypy.

Schaus described C. godrica as a new species in a 1934 paper on tropical American Heterocera. In her 1993 revision of the Pococera complex of Epipaschiinae, entomologist M. Alma Solis retained Chloropaschia as a distinct genus. At that time, she recognized 23 species in the genus.

== Identification ==
Solis distinguished Chloropaschia from related genera using characters of the wings, head, abdomen, and male genitalia. The forewing has a reniform spot reduced to a small dark line, while the medial line bends toward the base of the wing behind the spot.

In males, the genus is also characterized by a valva that widens toward the rear and bears non-deciduous hair-like setae, and by the shape of the gnathos. Species within Chloropaschia can be separated by differences in wing color and pattern, the shapes of parts of the male genitalia, and the pattern of hardening on the eighth abdominal sternum.

== Distribution ==
Chloropaschia godrica has been reported from the Amazon region. The genus as a whole has a wider Neotropical distribution; Solis recorded Chloropaschia from Guatemala south to northern Peru and the Brazilian Amazon.
