= Titanoceros malefica =

Scientific classification
- Kingdom: Animalia
- Phylum: Arthropoda
- Class: Insecta
- Order: Lepidoptera
- Family: Pyralidae
- Genus: Titanoceros
- Species: T. malefica

Binomial name
- Titanoceros malefica (Meyrick, 1934)

Synonyms
- Jocara malefica Meyrick, 1934

Species of moth

Titanoceros malefica is a species of snout moth. It is found in India.
