= Chloropaschia rufibasis =

Scientific classification
- Domain: Eukaryota
- Kingdom: Animalia
- Phylum: Arthropoda
- Class: Insecta
- Order: Lepidoptera
- Family: Pyralidae
- Genus: Chloropaschia
- Species: C. rufibasis

Binomial name
- Chloropaschia rufibasis (H. Druce, 1910)

Synonyms
- Macalla rufibasis H. Druce, 1910; Pococera brunnapex Kaye, 1922; Macalla claphealis Schaus, 1912

Species of moth

Chloropaschia rufibasis is a species of snout moth in the genus Chloropaschia. It is found in Trinidad, Costa Rica and Peru.
