= Agastophanes =

Scientific classification
- Kingdom: Animalia
- Phylum: Arthropoda
- Clade: Pancrustacea
- Class: Insecta
- Order: Lepidoptera
- Family: Pyralidae
- Subfamily: Epipaschiinae
- Genus: Agastophanes; Turner, 1937
- Species: A. zophoxysta

Binomial name
- Agastophanes zophoxysta Turner, 1937

Genus of moths

Agastophanes is a monotypic snout moth genus. It was described by Alfred Jefferis Turner in 1937. It contains the species Agastophanes zophoxysta, known from Queensland, Australia.
