= Isolopha =

Scientific classification
- Kingdom: Animalia
- Phylum: Arthropoda
- Class: Insecta
- Order: Lepidoptera
- Family: Pyralidae
- Subfamily: Epipaschiinae
- Genus: Isolopha; Hampson, 1895
- Species: I. lactealis

Binomial name
- Isolopha lactealis Hampson, 1895

Genus of moths

Isolopha is a monotypic snout moth genus. It was described by George Hampson in 1895 and contains the species Isolopha lactealis. It is found in the West Indies.
