= Elisabethinia =

Scientific classification
- Domain: Eukaryota
- Kingdom: Animalia
- Phylum: Arthropoda
- Class: Insecta
- Order: Lepidoptera
- Family: Pyralidae
- Subfamily: Epipaschiinae
- Genus: Elisabethinia; Ghesquière, 1942
- Species: E. cosmia

Binomial name
- Elisabethinia cosmia Ghesquière, 1942

Genus of moths

Elisabethinia is a monotypic snout moth genus described by Jean Ghesquière in 1942. Its only species, Elisabethinia cosmia, described by the same author in the same year, is known from the Democratic Republic of the Congo.
