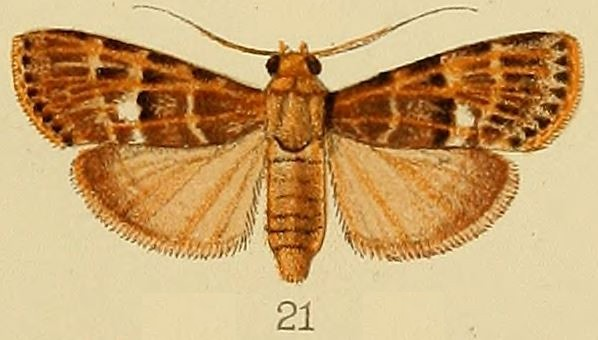

Scientific classification
- Domain: Eukaryota
- Kingdom: Animalia
- Phylum: Arthropoda
- Class: Insecta
- Order: Lepidoptera
- Family: Pyralidae
- Subfamily: Epipaschiinae
- Genus: Lacalma; Janse, 1931

= Lacalma =

Genus of moths

Lacalma is a genus of snout moths. It was described by Anthonie Johannes Theodorus Janse in 1931.

== Species ==
- Lacalma albirufalis (Hampson, 1916)
- Lacalma argenteorubra (Hampson, 1916)
- Lacalma ferrealis (Hampson, 1906)
- Lacalma mniomima (Turner, 1912)
- Lacalma papuensis (Warren, 1891)
- Lacalma porphyrealis (Kenrick, 1907)
