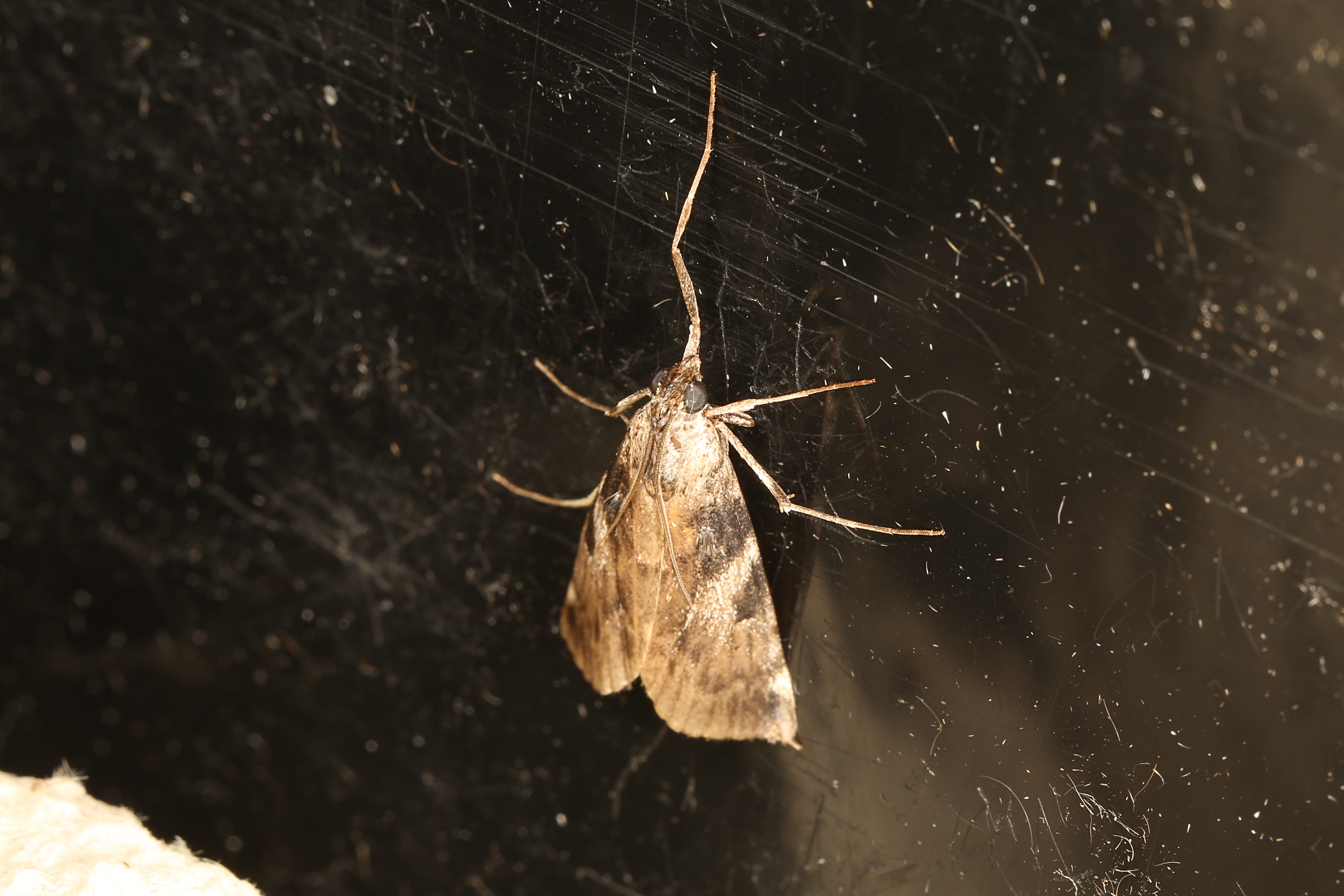

Scientific classification
- Kingdom: Animalia
- Phylum: Arthropoda
- Class: Insecta
- Order: Lepidoptera
- Family: Pyralidae
- Subfamily: Epipaschiinae
- Genus: Astrapometis; Meyrick, 1884
- Species: A. saburalis

Binomial name
- Astrapometis saburalis (Walker, 1859)

Synonyms
- Pyralis saburalis Walker, 1859

= Astrapometis =

Genus of moths

Astrapometis is a monotypic snout moth genus described by Edward Meyrick in 1884. It contains the species Astrapometis saburalis described by Francis Walker in 1859. It is found in Australia.
