= Anarnatula =

Scientific classification
- Kingdom: Animalia
- Phylum: Arthropoda
- Class: Insecta
- Order: Lepidoptera
- Family: Pyralidae
- Subfamily: Epipaschiinae
- Genus: Anarnatula; Dyar, 1918

Genus of moths

Anarnatula is a genus of snout moths. It was described by Harrison Gray Dyar Jr. in 1918.

== Species ==
- Anarnatula subflavida (Dyar, 1914)
- Anarnatula sylea (Druce, 1899)
