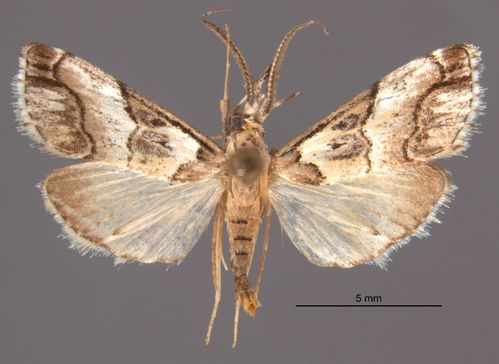

Scientific classification
- Kingdom: Animalia
- Phylum: Arthropoda
- Class: Insecta
- Order: Lepidoptera
- Family: Pyralidae
- Genus: Milgithea
- Species: M. trilinearis

Binomial name
- Milgithea trilinearis (Hampson, 1906)

Synonyms
- Jocara trilinearis Hampson, 1906

= Milgithea trilinearis =

Species of moth

Milgithea trilinearis is a species of snout moth in the genus Milgithea. It is found in Florida.
