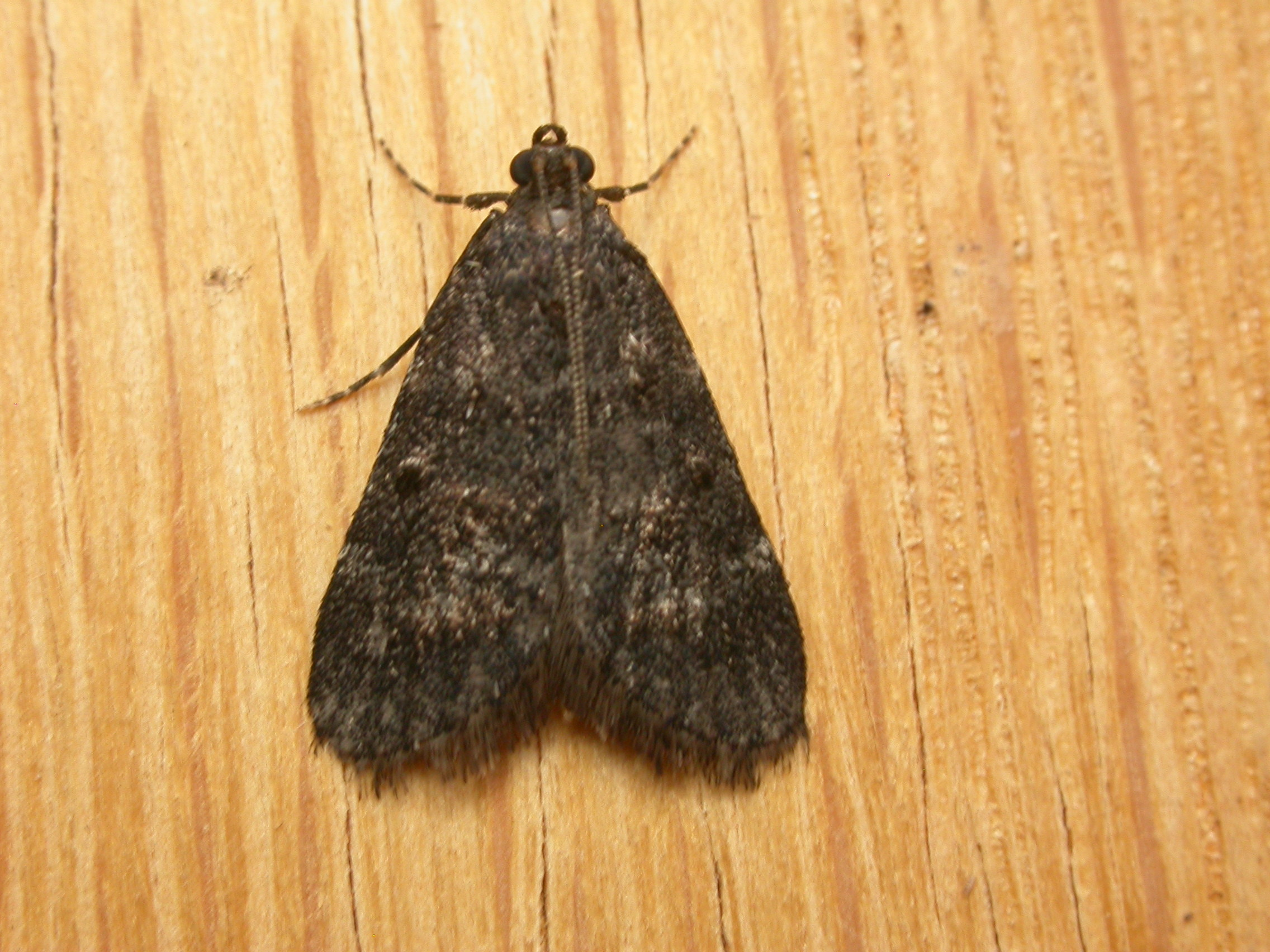

Scientific classification
- Kingdom: Animalia
- Phylum: Arthropoda
- Class: Insecta
- Order: Lepidoptera
- Family: Pyralidae
- Genus: Catamola
- Species: C. funerea

Binomial name
- Catamola funerea (Walker, 1863)

Synonyms
- Acrobasis funerea Walker, 1863

= Catamola funerea =

Species of moth

Catamola funerea is a species of snout moth in the genus Catamola. It was described by Francis Walker in 1863. It is found in Australia.
