= Titanoceros vinotinctalis =

Scientific classification
- Domain: Eukaryota
- Kingdom: Animalia
- Phylum: Arthropoda
- Class: Insecta
- Order: Lepidoptera
- Family: Pyralidae
- Genus: Titanoceros
- Species: T. vinotinctalis

Binomial name
- Titanoceros vinotinctalis (Caradja, 1927)

Synonyms
- Jocara vinotinctalis Caradja, 1927

Species of moth

Titanoceros vinotinctalis is a species of snout moth. It is found in China.
