= Ephedrophila algerialis =

Scientific classification
- Kingdom: Animalia
- Phylum: Arthropoda
- Class: Insecta
- Order: Lepidoptera
- Family: Pyralidae
- Genus: Ephedrophila
- Species: E. algerialis

Binomial name
- Ephedrophila algerialis (Hampson, 1900)

Synonyms
- Ulotricha algerialis Hampson, 1900

Species of moth

Ephedrophila algerialis is a species of snout moth in the genus Ephedrophila. It was described by George Hampson in 1900, and is known from Algeria, from which its species epithet is derived.
