= Titanoceros heliodryas =

Scientific classification
- Kingdom: Animalia
- Phylum: Arthropoda
- Class: Insecta
- Order: Lepidoptera
- Family: Pyralidae
- Genus: Titanoceros
- Species: T. heliodryas

Binomial name
- Titanoceros heliodryas Meyrick, 1933

Species of moth

Titanoceros heliodryas is a species of snout moth described by Edward Meyrick in 1933. It is found in Australia.
