= Canipsa poliochyta =

Scientific classification
- Domain: Eukaryota
- Kingdom: Animalia
- Phylum: Arthropoda
- Class: Insecta
- Order: Lepidoptera
- Family: Pyralidae
- Genus: Canipsa
- Species: C. poliochyta

Binomial name
- Canipsa poliochyta (Turner, 1904)

Synonyms
- Titanoceros poliochyta Turner, 1904

Species of moth

Canipsa poliochyta is a species of snout moth. It was described by Alfred Jefferis Turner in 1904 and is found in Australia.
