= Milgithea =

Scientific classification
- Kingdom: Animalia
- Phylum: Arthropoda
- Class: Insecta
- Order: Lepidoptera
- Family: Pyralidae
- Subfamily: Epipaschiinae
- Genus: Milgithea; Schaus, 1922

Synonyms
- Miligithea Neave, 1940

Genus of moths

Milgithea is a genus of snout moths. It was described by William Schaus in 1922.

== Species ==
- Milgithea alboplagialis
- Milgithea melanoleuca Hampson, 1896
- Milgithea rufiapicalis
- Milgithea suramisa
- Milgithea trilinearis
