= Titanoceros =

Scientific classification
- Kingdom: Animalia
- Phylum: Arthropoda
- Class: Insecta
- Order: Lepidoptera
- Family: Pyralidae
- Subfamily: Epipaschiinae
- Genus: Titanoceros; Meyrick, 1884

Genus of moths

Titanoceros is a genus of snout moths. It was described by Edward Meyrick in 1884.

== Species ==
- Titanoceros cataxantha Meyrick, 1884
- Titanoceros heliodryas Meyrick, 1933
- Titanoceros malefica (Meyrick, 1934)
- Titanoceros mirandalis (Caradja, 1925)
- Titanoceros thermoptera (Lower, 1903)
- Titanoceros vinotinctalis (Caradja, 1927)
- Titanoceros viridibasalis (Caradja, 1932)
