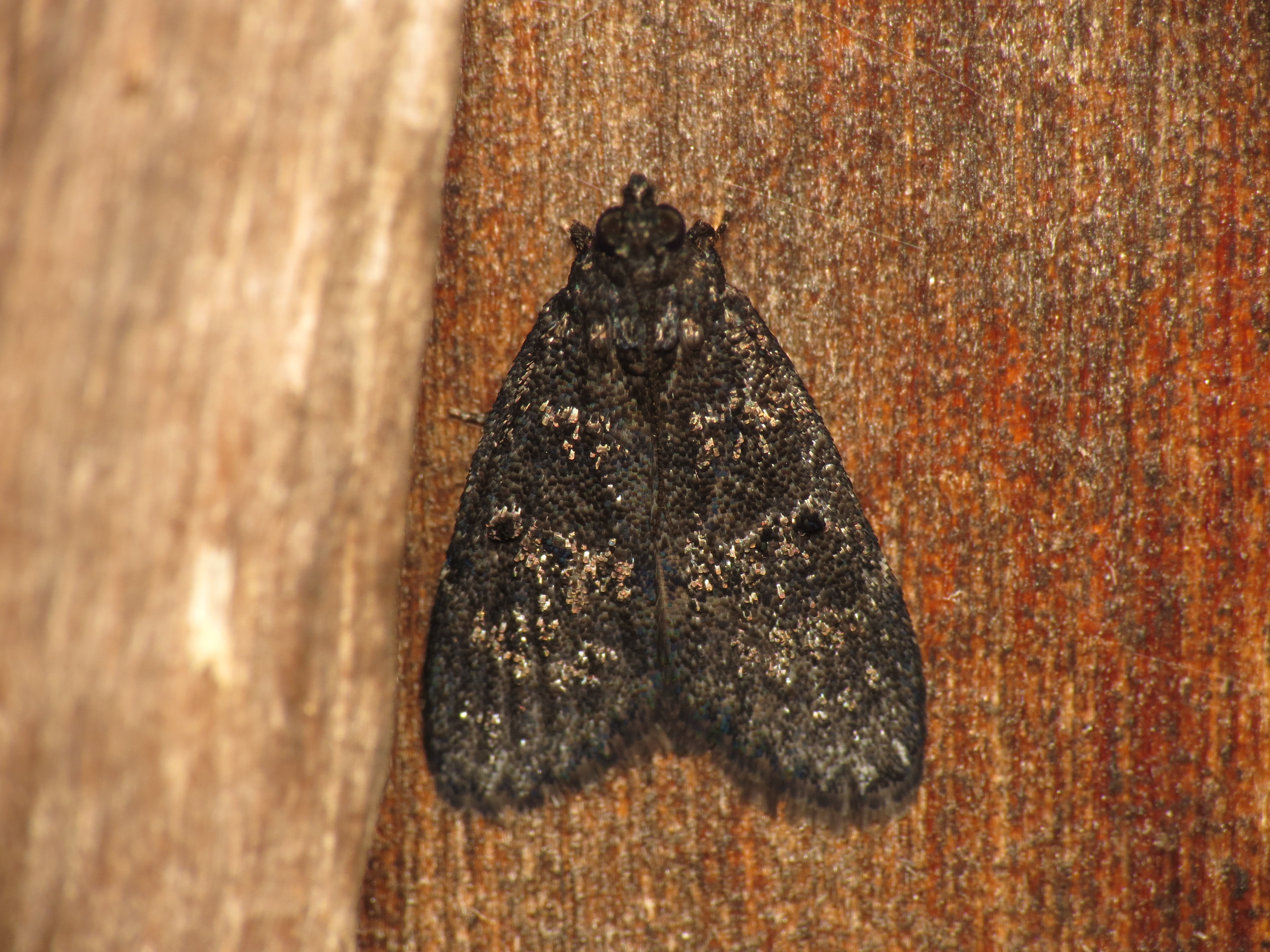

Scientific classification
- Kingdom: Animalia
- Phylum: Arthropoda
- Class: Insecta
- Order: Lepidoptera
- Family: Pyralidae
- Genus: Catamola
- Species: C. xanthomelalis

Binomial name
- Catamola xanthomelalis (Walker, 1863)

Synonyms
- Acrobasis xanthomelalis Walker, 1863

= Catamola xanthomelalis =

Species of moth

Catamola xanthomelalis is a species of snout moth in the genus Catamola. It was described by Francis Walker in 1863, and is known from Australia.
