= Anarnatula sylea =

Scientific classification
- Domain: Eukaryota
- Kingdom: Animalia
- Phylum: Arthropoda
- Class: Insecta
- Order: Lepidoptera
- Family: Pyralidae
- Genus: Anarnatula
- Species: A. sylea

Binomial name
- Anarnatula sylea (H. Druce, 1899)

Synonyms
- Pycnulia sylea H. Druce, 1899; Anarnatula hyperhoda Dyar, 1918

Species of moth

Anarnatula sylea is a species of snout moth in the genus Anarnatula. It was described by Herbert Druce in 1899 and is known from Mexico.
