= Lacalma papuensis =

Scientific classification
- Domain: Eukaryota
- Kingdom: Animalia
- Phylum: Arthropoda
- Class: Insecta
- Order: Lepidoptera
- Family: Pyralidae
- Genus: Lacalma
- Species: L. papuensis

Binomial name
- Lacalma papuensis (Warren, 1891)

Synonyms
- Stericta papuensis Warren, 1891

Species of moth

Lacalma papuensis is a species of snout moth in the genus Lacalma. It was described by William Warren in 1891, and is known from New Guinea and Australia.
