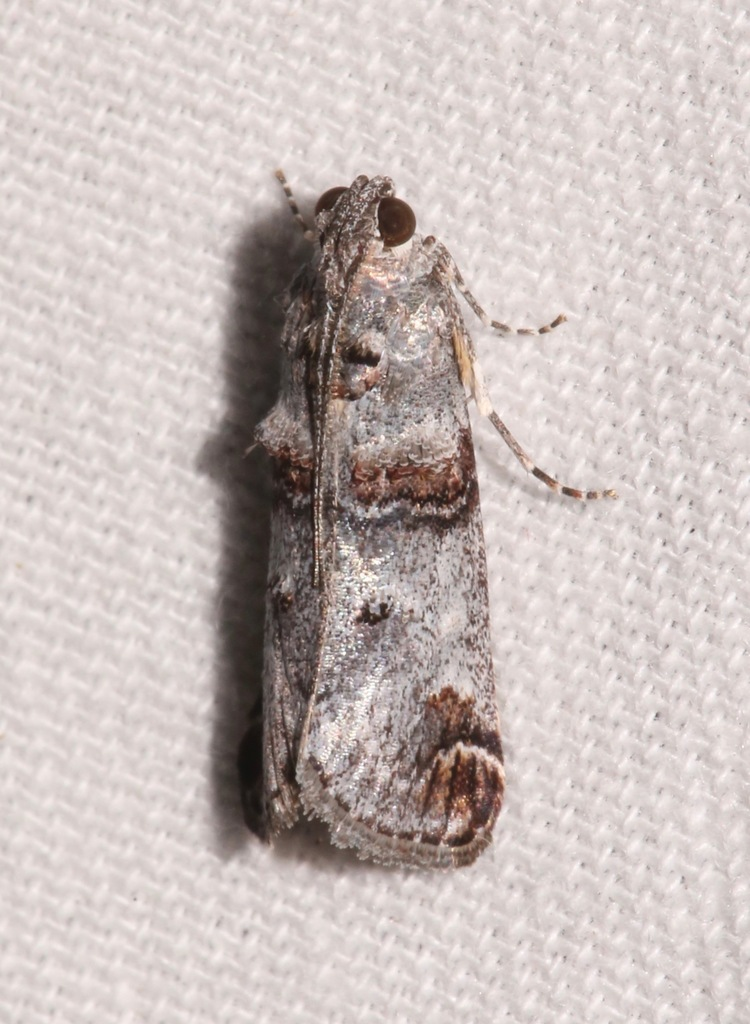

Scientific classification
- Domain: Eukaryota
- Kingdom: Animalia
- Phylum: Arthropoda
- Class: Insecta
- Order: Lepidoptera
- Family: Pyralidae
- Genus: Oneida
- Species: O. luniferella

Binomial name
- Oneida luniferella Hulst, 1895

Synonyms
- Oneida diploa Dyar, 1920; Oneida luniferella r. pallidalis Barnes & Benjamin, 1924

= Oneida luniferella =

Species of moth

Oneida luniferella is a species of snout moth in the genus Oneida. It was described by George Duryea Hulst in 1895. It is found in the western part of the United States and Mexico.

== Subspecies ==
- Oneida luniferella luniferella
- Oneida luniferella pallidalis Barnes & Benjamin, 1924
