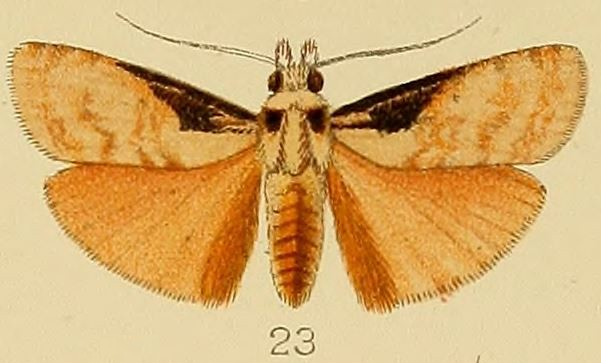
- Polylophota barbarossa

Scientific classification
- Kingdom: Animalia
- Phylum: Arthropoda
- Clade: Pancrustacea
- Class: Insecta
- Order: Lepidoptera
- Family: Pyralidae
- Subfamily: Epipaschiinae
- Genus: Polylophota; Hampson, 1906

Type species
- Polylophota barbarossa Hampson, 1906

= Polylophota =

Genus of moths

Polylophota is a genus of snout moths. It was described by George Hampson in 1906.

== Species ==
Some species of this genus are:

- Polylophota aruensis Kenrick 1912
- Polylophota atriplagalis Hampson, 1916
- Polylophota barbarossa Hampson, 1906
- Polylophota senilis Janse 1931
