= Chloropaschia fiachnalis =

Scientific classification
- Domain: Eukaryota
- Kingdom: Animalia
- Phylum: Arthropoda
- Class: Insecta
- Order: Lepidoptera
- Family: Pyralidae
- Genus: Chloropaschia
- Species: C. fiachnalis

Binomial name
- Chloropaschia fiachnalis Schaus, 1925

Species of moth

Chloropaschia fiachnalis is a species of snout moth in the genus Chloropaschia. It is found in South America.
