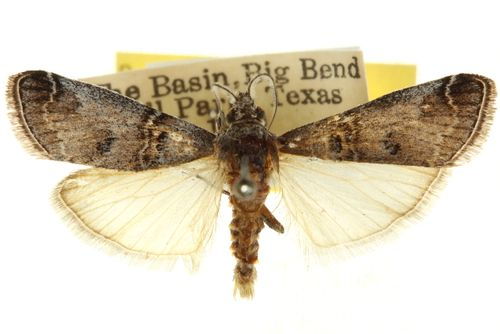

Scientific classification
- Kingdom: Animalia
- Phylum: Arthropoda
- Clade: Pancrustacea
- Class: Insecta
- Order: Lepidoptera
- Family: Pyralidae
- Genus: Oneida
- Species: O. grisiella

Binomial name
- Oneida grisiella Solis, 1991

= Oneida grisiella =

Species of moth

Oneida grisiella is a species of snout moth in the genus Oneida. It is found in the US state of Texas.
