= Bibasilaris =

Scientific classification
- Kingdom: Animalia
- Phylum: Arthropoda
- Clade: Pancrustacea
- Class: Insecta
- Order: Lepidoptera
- Family: Pyralidae
- Subfamily: Epipaschiinae
- Genus: Bibasilaris; Solis, 1993

Genus of moths

Bibasilaris is a genus of snout moths. It was described by Maria Alma Solis in 1993.

== Species ==
- Bibasilaris erythea (Druce, 1900)
- Bibasilaris trisulcata (Warren, 1891)
