= Ephedrophila lucasi =

Scientific classification
- Domain: Eukaryota
- Kingdom: Animalia
- Phylum: Arthropoda
- Class: Insecta
- Order: Lepidoptera
- Family: Pyralidae
- Genus: Ephedrophila
- Species: E. lucasi

Binomial name
- Ephedrophila lucasi (Mabille, 1907)

Synonyms
- Ulotricha lucasi Mabille, 1907

Species of moth

Ephedrophila lucasi is a species of snout moth in the genus Ephedrophila. It was described by Paul Mabille in 1907. It is found in Tunisia.
