= Homura nocturnalis =

Scientific classification
- Domain: Eukaryota
- Kingdom: Animalia
- Phylum: Arthropoda
- Class: Insecta
- Order: Lepidoptera
- Family: Pyralidae
- Subfamily: Epipaschiinae
- Genus: Homura; Lederer, 1863
- Species: H. nocturnalis

Binomial name
- Homura nocturnalis Lederer, 1863

Synonyms
- Macalla nocturnalis; Locastra nocturnalis

Species of moth

Homura is a monotypic snout moth genus in the family Pyralidae. Its only species, Homura nocturnalis, is found in Brazil. Both the genus and species were first described by Julius Lederer in 1863.
