= Glossopaschia =

Scientific classification
- Kingdom: Animalia
- Phylum: Arthropoda
- Class: Insecta
- Order: Lepidoptera
- Family: Pyralidae
- Subfamily: Epipaschiinae
- Genus: Glossopaschia; Dyar, 1914
- Species: G. caenoses

Binomial name
- Glossopaschia caenoses Dyar, 1914

Genus of moths

Glossopaschia is a monotypic snout moth genus. It was described by Harrison Gray Dyar Jr. in 1914 and contains the species Glossopaschia caenoses. It is found in Panama.
