= Mazdacis consimilis =

Scientific classification
- Kingdom: Animalia
- Phylum: Arthropoda
- Class: Insecta
- Order: Lepidoptera
- Family: Pyralidae
- Genus: Mazdacis
- Species: M. consimilis

Binomial name
- Mazdacis consimilis (Dognin, 1911)

Synonyms
- Epipaschia consimilis Dognin, 1911

Species of moth

Mazdacis consimilis is a species of snout moth in the genus Mazdacis. It was described by Paul Dognin in 1911. It is found in Guyana.
