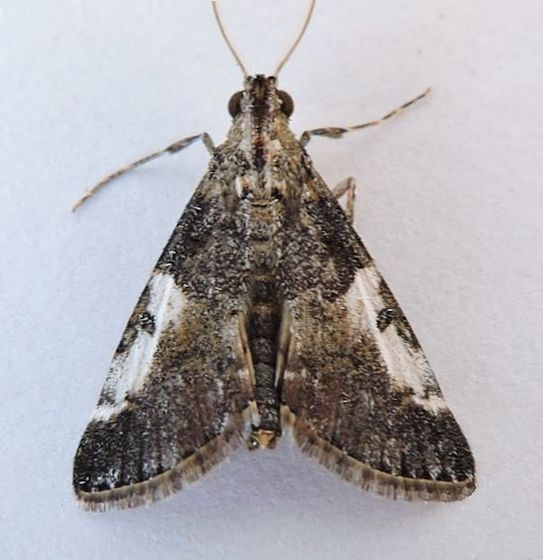

Scientific classification
- Kingdom: Animalia
- Phylum: Arthropoda
- Class: Insecta
- Order: Lepidoptera
- Family: Pyralidae
- Genus: Milgithea
- Species: M. alboplagialis

Binomial name
- Milgithea alboplagialis (Dyar, 1905)

Synonyms
- Cacozelia alboplagialis Dyar, 1905

= Milgithea alboplagialis =

Species of moth

Milgithea alboplagialis is a species of snout moth in the genus Milgithea. It is found in the Huachuca Mountains in Arizona. The wingspan is 23–27 mm.
