= Geropaschia =

Scientific classification
- Kingdom: Animalia
- Phylum: Arthropoda
- Class: Insecta
- Order: Lepidoptera
- Family: Pyralidae
- Subfamily: Epipaschiinae
- Genus: Geropaschia; Hampson, 1917
- Species: G. grisealis

Binomial name
- Geropaschia grisealis (Hampson, 1916)

Synonyms
- Genus: Araeopaschia Hampson, 1916; Species: Araeopaschia grisealis Hampson, 1916

Genus of moths

Geropaschia is a monotypic snout moth genus. Its only species, Geropaschia grisealis, is found in Brazil. The genus was described by George Hampson in 1917 and the species had been described by the same author one year earlier.
