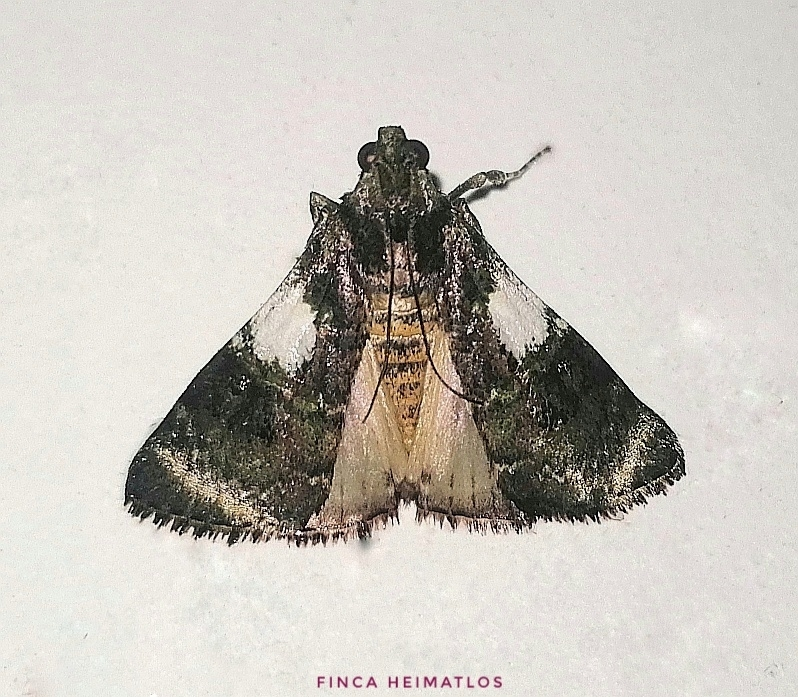
- Accinctapubes albifasciata

Scientific classification
- Domain: Eukaryota
- Kingdom: Animalia
- Phylum: Arthropoda
- Class: Insecta
- Order: Lepidoptera
- Family: Pyralidae
- Genus: Accinctapubes
- Species: A. albifasciata

Binomial name
- Accinctapubes albifasciata (H. Druce, 1902)

Synonyms
- Cecidiptera albifasciata H. Druce, 1902; Stericta leucoplagialis var. purusalis Holland & Schaus, 1925; Jocara ban Dyar, 1916; Stericta leucoplagialis; Stericta albifasciata

= Accinctapubes albifasciata =

Species of moth

Accinctapubes albifasciata is a species of snout moth in the genus Accinctapubes. It was described by Herbert Druce in 1902, and is known from southern Mexico Brazil, Colombia, Bolivia, Ecuador, French Guiana, Guyana, Venezuela, Dominican Republic, and Trinidad.

The larvae feed on Persea americana and Ocotea veraguensis.
