= Eublemmodes =

Scientific classification
- Domain: Eukaryota
- Kingdom: Animalia
- Phylum: Arthropoda
- Class: Insecta
- Order: Lepidoptera
- Family: Pyralidae
- Subfamily: Epipaschiinae
- Genus: Eublemmodes; Gaede, 1917
- Species: E. contumacialis

Binomial name
- Eublemmodes contumacialis Gaede, 1917

Genus of moths

Eublemmodes is a monotypic snout moth genus. It was described by Max Gaede in 1917, and is known from Cameroon. It contains the species Eublemmodes contumacialis.

This species has a wingspan of 17–18 mm.
