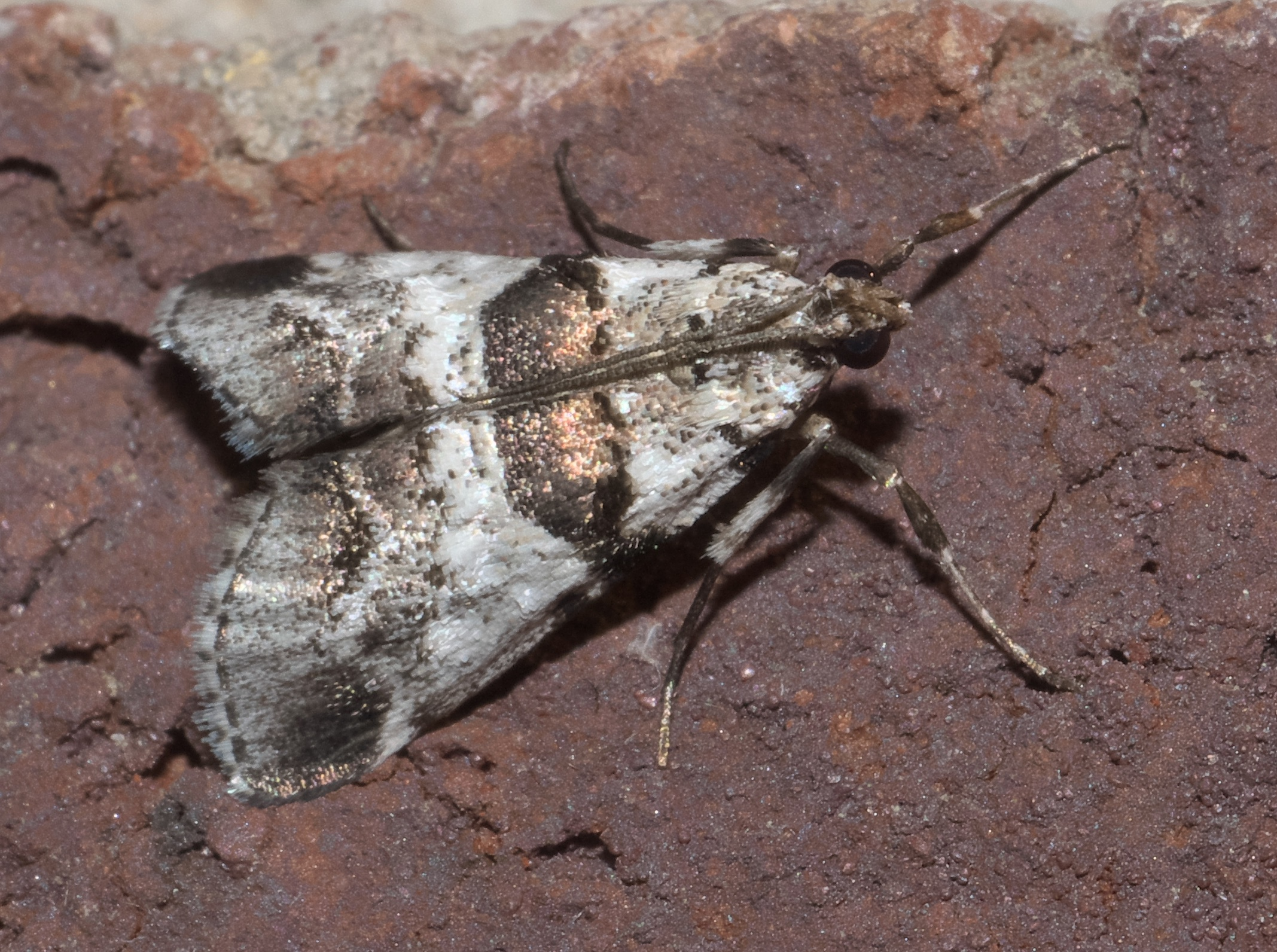
- Tallula atrifascialis

Scientific classification
- Kingdom: Animalia
- Phylum: Arthropoda
- Class: Insecta
- Order: Lepidoptera
- Family: Pyralidae
- Subfamily: Epipaschiinae
- Genus: Tallula; Hulst, 1888

= Tallula (moth) =

Genus of moths

Tallula is a genus of pyralid moths in the family Pyralidae. There are about 11 described species in Tallula.

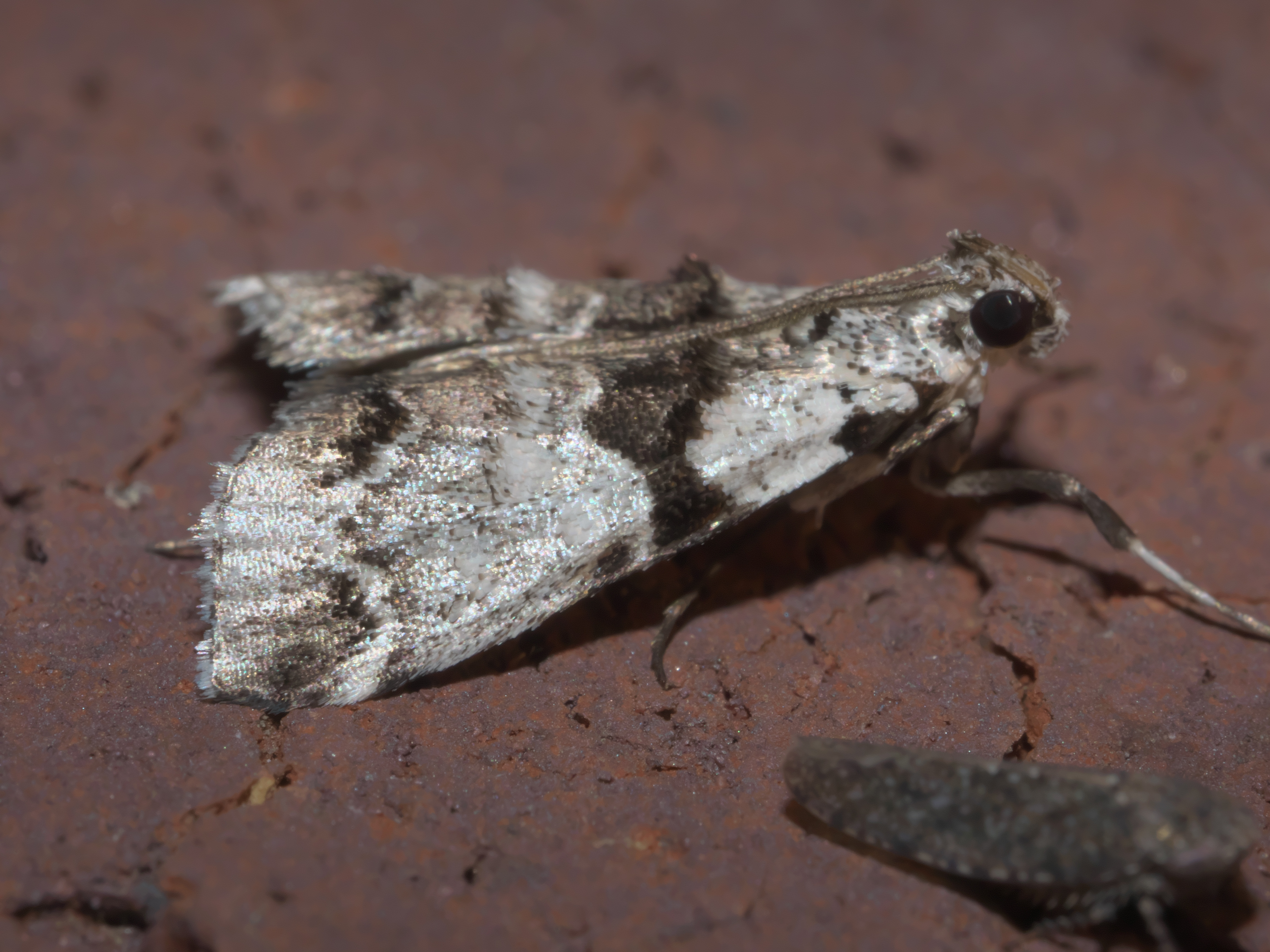
Tallula atrifascialis

== Species ==
These 11 species belong to the genus Tallula:

- Tallula atramentalis Lederer, 1863^{c g}
- Tallula atrifascialis Hulst, 1886^{c g b}
- Tallula baboquivarialis Barnes & Benjamin, 1926^{c g b}
- Tallula beroella Schaus, 1912^{c g b}
- Tallula fieldi Barnes & McDunnough, 1911^{c g b}
- Tallula fovealis Hampson, 1906^{c g}
- Tallula juanalis Schaus, 1925^{c g}
- Tallula melazonalis Hampson, 1906^{c g}
- Tallula rigualis Lederer, 1863^{c g}
- Tallula tersilla Dyar, 1914^{c g}
- Tallula watsoni Barnes & McDunnough, 1916^{c g b} (Watson's tallula moth)

Data sources: i = ITIS, c = Catalogue of Life, g = GBIF, b = Bugguide.net
