= Ephedrophila jordanalis =

Scientific classification
- Domain: Eukaryota
- Kingdom: Animalia
- Phylum: Arthropoda
- Class: Insecta
- Order: Lepidoptera
- Family: Pyralidae
- Genus: Ephedrophila
- Species: E. jordanalis

Binomial name
- Ephedrophila jordanalis (Rebel, 1902)

Synonyms
- Lepidogma jordanalis Mabille, 1907; Anartula constantialis Hampson, 1906

Species of moth

Ephedrophila jordanalis is a species of snout moth in the genus Ephedrophila. It was described by Hans Rebel in 1902. It is found in Jordan and Egypt.
