= Oxyalcia =

Scientific classification
- Kingdom: Animalia
- Phylum: Arthropoda
- Class: Insecta
- Order: Lepidoptera
- Family: Pyralidae
- Subfamily: Epipaschiinae
- Genus: Oxyalcia; Dognin, 1905
- Species: O. mira

Binomial name
- Oxyalcia mira (H. Druce, 1902)

Synonyms
- Macalla mira H. Druce, 1902; Oxyalcia ovifera Dognin, 1905

Genus and species of moth

Oxyalcia is a monotypic snout moth genus described by Paul Dognin in 1905. Its only species, Oxyalcia mira, was described by Herbert Druce in 1902 and is known from Ecuador.
