= Cecidipta major =

Scientific classification
- Domain: Eukaryota
- Kingdom: Animalia
- Phylum: Arthropoda
- Class: Insecta
- Order: Lepidoptera
- Family: Pyralidae
- Genus: Cecidipta
- Species: C. major

Binomial name
- Cecidipta major (Amsel, 1956)

Synonyms
- Acecidipta major Amsel, 1956

Species of moth

Cecidipta major is a species of snout moth in the genus Cecidipta. It was described by Hans Georg Amsel in 1956. It is found in Venezuela.
