= Lacalma albirufalis =

Scientific classification
- Kingdom: Animalia
- Phylum: Arthropoda
- Clade: Pancrustacea
- Class: Insecta
- Order: Lepidoptera
- Family: Pyralidae
- Genus: Lacalma
- Species: L. albirufalis

Binomial name
- Lacalma albirufalis (Hampson, 1916)

Synonyms
- Macalla albirufalis Hampson, 1916; Macalla diaprepes Turner, 1925

Species of moth

Lacalma albirufalis is a species of snout moth in the genus Lacalma. It was described by George Hampson in 1916 and is known from New Guinea and Australia, including Queensland.

The wingspan is about 30 mm. This forewings are fawn with white speckles, while the hindwings are plain brown.
