= Accinctapubes amplissima =

Scientific classification
- Kingdom: Animalia
- Phylum: Arthropoda
- Clade: Pancrustacea
- Class: Insecta
- Order: Lepidoptera
- Family: Pyralidae
- Genus: Accinctapubes
- Species: A. amplissima

Binomial name
- Accinctapubes amplissima Solis & Styer, 2003

Species of moth

Accinctapubes amplissima is a species of snout moth in the genus Accinctapubes. It was described by Solis and Styer, in 2003, and is known from Costa Rica.

The length of the forewings is 17 millimetres (0.67 in) for males and 17–19 millimetres (0.67–0.75 in) for females.
