= Lameerea =

Scientific classification
- Kingdom: Animalia
- Phylum: Arthropoda
- Class: Insecta
- Order: Lepidoptera
- Family: Pyralidae
- Subfamily: Epipaschiinae
- Genus: Lameerea; Ghesquière, 1942
- Species: L. ensipalpis

Binomial name
- Lameerea ensipalpis Ghesquière, 1942

Genus of moths

Lameerea is a monotypic snout moth genus described by Jean Ghesquière in 1942. Its only species, Lameerea ensipalpis, described by the same author in the same year, is known from Zaire.
