= Araeopaschia rufescentalis =

Scientific classification
- Kingdom: Animalia
- Phylum: Arthropoda
- Class: Insecta
- Order: Lepidoptera
- Family: Pyralidae
- Genus: Araeopaschia
- Species: A. rufescentalis

Binomial name
- Araeopaschia rufescentalis Hampson, 1906

Species of moth

Araeopaschia rufescentalis is a species of snout moth in the genus Araeopaschia. It was described by George Hampson in 1906. It is found in Australia.
