= Carthara albicosta =

Scientific classification
- Kingdom: Animalia
- Phylum: Arthropoda
- Class: Insecta
- Order: Lepidoptera
- Family: Pyralidae
- Genus: Carthara
- Species: C. albicosta

Binomial name
- Carthara albicosta Walker, 1865

Synonyms
- Leptosphetta rabdina Butler, 1878; Idia scopipes C. Felder, R. Felder & Rogenhofer, 1875; Pycnulia ministra Zeller, 1881

Species of moth

Carthara albicosta is a species of snout moth in the genus Carthara. It was described by Francis Walker in 1865. It is found from the Amazon basin to Costa Rica.
