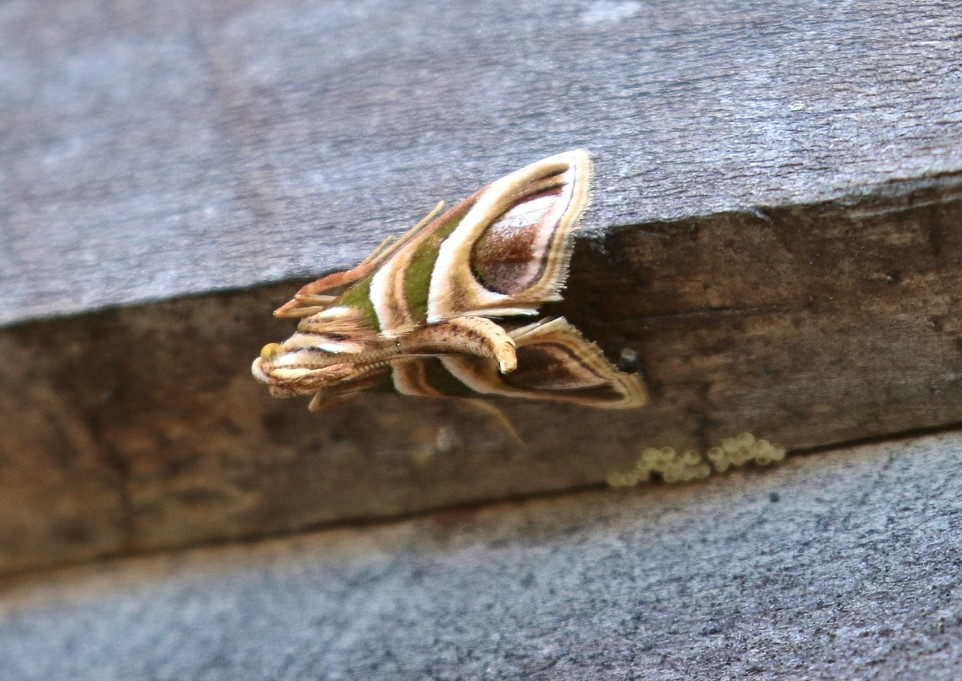
- Incarcha spp.

Scientific classification
- Domain: Eukaryota
- Kingdom: Animalia
- Phylum: Arthropoda
- Class: Insecta
- Order: Lepidoptera
- Family: Pyralidae
- Subfamily: Epipaschiinae
- Genus: Incarcha; Dyar, 1910

= Incarcha =

Genus of moths

Incarcha is a genus of snout moths. It was described by Harrison Gray Dyar Jr. in 1910 and contains species found in South America.

There are two species recognised in the genus Incarcha:

- Incarcha aporalis Dyar, 1910
- Incarcha argentilinea Druce, 1910
