= Obutobea =

Scientific classification
- Kingdom: Animalia
- Phylum: Arthropoda
- Class: Insecta
- Order: Lepidoptera
- Family: Pyralidae
- Subfamily: Epipaschiinae
- Genus: Obutobea; Ghesquière, 1942
- Species: O. chrysophora

Binomial name
- Obutobea chrysophora Ghesquière, 1942

Genus of moths

Obutobea is a monotypic snout moth genus. Its only species, Obutobea chrysophora, was described by Jean Ghesquière in 1942, and is known from the Democratic Republic of the Congo.
