= Anexophana =

Scientific classification
- Kingdom: Animalia
- Phylum: Arthropoda
- Class: Insecta
- Order: Lepidoptera
- Family: Pyralidae
- Subfamily: Epipaschiinae
- Genus: Anexophana; Viette, 1960
- Species: A. robinsonalis

Binomial name
- Anexophana robinsonalis Viette, 1960

Synonyms
- Anexophana obinsonalis

Genus of moths

Anexophana is a monotypic snout moth genus. It was described by Pierre Viette in 1960 and contains the species A. robinsonalis. It is found on Madagascar.
