= Bibasilaris erythea =

Scientific classification
- Domain: Eukaryota
- Kingdom: Animalia
- Phylum: Arthropoda
- Class: Insecta
- Order: Lepidoptera
- Family: Pyralidae
- Genus: Bibasilaris
- Species: B. erythea

Binomial name
- Bibasilaris erythea (H. Druce, 1900)

Synonyms
- Homura erythea H. Druce, 1900; Macalla ineldolis Schaus, 1934; Macalla paranensis Schaus, 1906

Species of moth

Bibasilaris erythea is a species of snout moth. It was described by Herbert Druce in 1900. It is found in Colombia and Brazil.
