= Cecidipta teffealis =

Scientific classification
- Domain: Eukaryota
- Kingdom: Animalia
- Phylum: Arthropoda
- Class: Insecta
- Order: Lepidoptera
- Family: Pyralidae
- Genus: Cecidipta
- Species: C. teffealis

Binomial name
- Cecidipta teffealis (Schaus, 1922)

Synonyms
- Stericta teffealis Schaus, 1922

Species of moth

Cecidipta teffealis is a species of snout moth in the genus Cecidipta. It was described by Schaus in 1922, and is known from Brazil.
