= Ephedrophila =

Scientific classification
- Domain: Eukaryota
- Kingdom: Animalia
- Phylum: Arthropoda
- Class: Insecta
- Order: Lepidoptera
- Family: Pyralidae
- Subfamily: Epipaschiinae
- Genus: Ephedrophila; Dumont, 1928

Genus of moths

Ephedrophila is a genus of snout moths. It was described by Constantin Dumont in 1928.

== Species ==
- Ephedrophila algerialis (Hampson, 1900)
- Ephedrophila jordanalis (Rebel, 1902)
- Ephedrophila lucasi (Mabille, 1907)
