= Chloropaschia afflicta =

Scientific classification
- Domain: Eukaryota
- Kingdom: Animalia
- Phylum: Arthropoda
- Class: Insecta
- Order: Lepidoptera
- Family: Pyralidae
- Genus: Chloropaschia
- Species: C. afflicta

Binomial name
- Chloropaschia afflicta Schaus, 1922

Species of moth

Chloropaschia afflicta is a species of snout moth in the genus Chloropaschia. It is found in Guatemala.
