= Chloropaschia =

Scientific classification
- Kingdom: Animalia
- Phylum: Arthropoda
- Class: Insecta
- Order: Lepidoptera
- Family: Pyralidae
- Subfamily: Epipaschiinae
- Genus: Chloropaschia; Hampson, 1906

Genus of moths

Chloropaschia is a genus of snout moths. It was described by George Hampson in 1906 and is known from Brazil and Venezuela.

== Species ==
- Chloropaschia adesia
- Chloropaschia afflicta
- Chloropaschia agathoa
- Chloropaschia aniana
- Chloropaschia brithvalda
- Chloropaschia canities
- Chloropaschia epipodia
- Chloropaschia fabianalis
- Chloropaschia fiachnalis
- Chloropaschia godrica
- Chloropaschia granitalis (C. Felder, R. Felder & Rogenhofer, 1875)
- Chloropaschia hemileuca
- Chloropaschia hollandalis Schaus, 1925
- Chloropaschia lascerianalis
- Chloropaschia lativalva (Amsel, 1956)
- Chloropaschia mennusalis
- Chloropaschia nadena
- Chloropaschia pegalis
- Chloropaschia possidia
- Chloropaschia rufibasis
- Chloropaschia selecta
- Chloropaschia thermalis Hampson, 1906
- Chloropaschia venantia
