= Odontopaschia =

Scientific classification
- Kingdom: Animalia
- Phylum: Arthropoda
- Class: Insecta
- Order: Lepidoptera
- Family: Pyralidae
- Subfamily: Epipaschiinae
- Genus: Odontopaschia; Hampson, 1903

Genus of moths

Odontopaschia is a genus of snout moths. It was described by George Hampson in 1903.

== Species ==
- Odontopaschia ecnomia Turner, 1913
- Odontopaschia stephanuchra
- Odontopaschia virescens Hampson, 1903
