= Lepipaschia =

Scientific classification
- Kingdom: Animalia
- Phylum: Arthropoda
- Clade: Pancrustacea
- Class: Insecta
- Order: Lepidoptera
- Family: Pyralidae
- Subfamily: Epipaschiinae
- Genus: Lepipaschia; Shaffer & Solis, 1994

Genus of moths

Lepipaschia is a genus of snout moths. It was described by Jay C. Shaffer and Maria Alma Solis in 1994.

== Species ==
- Lepipaschia inornata J. C. Shaffer & Solis, 1994
- Lepipaschia limbata J. C. Shaffer & Solis, 1994
