= Chloropaschia nadena =

Scientific classification
- Domain: Eukaryota
- Kingdom: Animalia
- Phylum: Arthropoda
- Class: Insecta
- Order: Lepidoptera
- Family: Pyralidae
- Genus: Chloropaschia
- Species: C. nadena

Binomial name
- Chloropaschia nadena Schaus, 1934

Species of moth

Chloropaschia nadena is a species of snout moth in the genus Chloropaschia. It is found in the Amazon region.
