= Micropaschia =

Scientific classification
- Kingdom: Animalia
- Phylum: Arthropoda
- Class: Insecta
- Order: Lepidoptera
- Family: Pyralidae
- Subfamily: Epipaschiinae
- Genus: Micropaschia; Hampson, 1906
- Species: M. orthogrammalis

Binomial name
- Micropaschia orthogrammalis Hampson, 1906

Genus of moths

Micropaschia is a monotypic snout moth genus. Its only species, Micropaschia orthogrammalis, was described by George Hampson in 1906. It is found in French Guiana.
