= Chloropaschia lativalva =

Scientific classification
- Domain: Eukaryota
- Kingdom: Animalia
- Phylum: Arthropoda
- Class: Insecta
- Order: Lepidoptera
- Family: Pyralidae
- Genus: Chloropaschia
- Species: C. lativalva

Binomial name
- Chloropaschia lativalva (Amsel, 1956)

Synonyms
- Arnatula lativalva Amsel, 1956

Species of moth

Chloropaschia lativalva is a species of snout moth in the genus Chloropaschia. It was described by Hans Georg Amsel in 1956 and is known from Venezuela.
