= Odontopaschia stephanuchra =

Scientific classification
- Kingdom: Animalia
- Phylum: Arthropoda
- Class: Insecta
- Order: Lepidoptera
- Family: Pyralidae
- Genus: Odontopaschia
- Species: O. stephanuchra

Binomial name
- Odontopaschia stephanuchra Tams, 1935

Species of moth

Odontopaschia stephanuchra is a species of snout moth in the genus Odontopaschia. It is known from Samoa.
