= Chloropaschia fabianalis =

Scientific classification
- Domain: Eukaryota
- Kingdom: Animalia
- Phylum: Arthropoda
- Class: Insecta
- Order: Lepidoptera
- Family: Pyralidae
- Genus: Chloropaschia
- Species: C. fabianalis

Binomial name
- Chloropaschia fabianalis (Schaus, 1922)

Synonyms
- Pococera fabianalis Schaus, 1922

Species of moth

Chloropaschia fabianalis is a species of snout moth in the genus Chloropaschia. It is found in French Guiana.
