= Chloropaschia canities =

Scientific classification
- Domain: Eukaryota
- Kingdom: Animalia
- Phylum: Arthropoda
- Class: Insecta
- Order: Lepidoptera
- Family: Pyralidae
- Genus: Chloropaschia
- Species: C. canities

Binomial name
- Chloropaschia canities Schaus, 1912

Synonyms
- Stericta contortilinealis Dognin, 1908; Macalla rufilinea Druce, 1910

Species of moth

Chloropaschia canities is a species of snout moth in the genus Chloropaschia. It is found in Costa Rica.
