= Titanoceros thermoptera =

Scientific classification
- Domain: Eukaryota
- Kingdom: Animalia
- Phylum: Arthropoda
- Class: Insecta
- Order: Lepidoptera
- Family: Pyralidae
- Genus: Titanoceros
- Species: T. thermoptera

Binomial name
- Titanoceros thermoptera (Lower, 1903)

Synonyms
- Jocara thermoptera Lower, 1903

Species of moth

Titanoceros thermoptera is a species of snout moth described by Oswald Bertram Lower in 1903. It is found in Australia.

The larvae are predacious on the eggs of Ochrogaster thermoptera.
