= Oneida mejona =

Scientific classification
- Domain: Eukaryota
- Kingdom: Animalia
- Phylum: Arthropoda
- Class: Insecta
- Order: Lepidoptera
- Family: Pyralidae
- Genus: Oneida
- Species: O. mejona

Binomial name
- Oneida mejona Schaus, 1922

Species of moth

Oneida mejona is a species of snout moth in the genus Oneida. It is found in Guatemala and Mexico.
