= Cecidipta excoecariae =

Scientific classification
- Domain: Eukaryota
- Kingdom: Animalia
- Phylum: Arthropoda
- Class: Insecta
- Order: Lepidoptera
- Family: Pyralidae
- Genus: Cecidipta
- Species: C. excoecariae

Binomial name
- Cecidipta excoecariae Berg, 1877

Synonyms
- Locastra phyalis Druce, 1899; Cecidipta abnormalis Dognin, 1904; Macalla albescens Schaus, 1906; Earoctenis miosema Meyrick, 1936; Stericta olivenca Schaus, 1925

Species of moth

Cecidipta excoecariae is a species of snout moth in the genus Cecidipta. It was described by Carl Berg in 1877.

== Distribution ==
It is found in South America, including Bolivia and Argentina.
