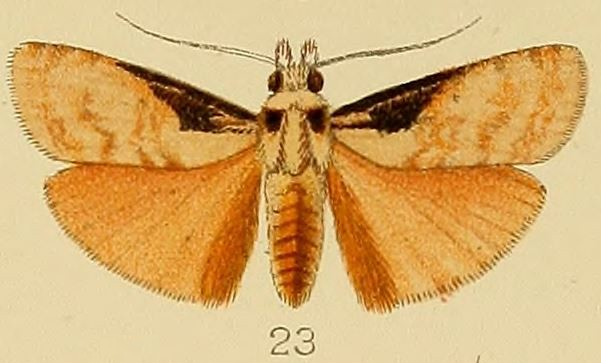

Scientific classification
- Kingdom: Animalia
- Phylum: Arthropoda
- Class: Insecta
- Order: Lepidoptera
- Family: Pyralidae
- Genus: Polylophota
- Species: P. barbarossa

Binomial name
- Polylophota barbarossa Hampson, 1906

Synonyms
- Polylophoto truncalis Kenrick, 1907

= Polylophota barbarossa =

Species of moth

Polylophota barbarossa is a species of moth of the family Pyralidae. It is found in Papua New Guinea.

It has a wingspan of 38 mm.
