= Carthara abrupta =

Scientific classification
- Kingdom: Animalia
- Phylum: Arthropoda
- Clade: Pancrustacea
- Class: Insecta
- Order: Lepidoptera
- Family: Pyralidae
- Genus: Carthara
- Species: C. abrupta

Binomial name
- Carthara abrupta (Zeller, 1881)

Synonyms
- Pycnulia abrupta Zeller, 1881

Species of moth

Carthara abrupta is a species of snout moth in the genus Carthara. It is found in Colombia and Brazil.
