= Canipsa suspensalis =

Scientific classification
- Kingdom: Animalia
- Phylum: Arthropoda
- Class: Insecta
- Order: Lepidoptera
- Family: Pyralidae
- Genus: Canipsa
- Species: C. suspensalis

Binomial name
- Canipsa suspensalis Walker, 1866

Synonyms
- Canipsa subpensalis; Stericta suspensalis; Macalla capnotila Meyrick, 1938

Species of moth

Canipsa suspensalis is a species of snout moth. It was described by Francis Walker in 1866 and is found in Indonesia (including Borneo and Java).
