= Bibasilaris trisulcata =

Scientific classification
- Domain: Eukaryota
- Kingdom: Animalia
- Phylum: Arthropoda
- Class: Insecta
- Order: Lepidoptera
- Family: Pyralidae
- Genus: Bibasilaris
- Species: B. trisulcata

Binomial name
- Bibasilaris trisulcata (Warren, 1891)

Synonyms
- Homura trisulcata Warren, 1891; Locastra viriditincta Schaus, 1912

Species of moth

Bibasilaris trisulcata is a species of snout moth. It was described by Warren in 1891. It is found in Costa Rica.
