= Chloropaschia venantia =

Scientific classification
- Domain: Eukaryota
- Kingdom: Animalia
- Phylum: Arthropoda
- Class: Insecta
- Order: Lepidoptera
- Family: Pyralidae
- Genus: Chloropaschia
- Species: C. venantia

Binomial name
- Chloropaschia venantia Schaus, 1925

Species of moth

Chloropaschia venantia is a species of snout moth in the genus Chloropaschia. It is found in South America.
