= Oneida marmorata =

Scientific classification
- Kingdom: Animalia
- Phylum: Arthropoda
- Clade: Pancrustacea
- Class: Insecta
- Order: Lepidoptera
- Family: Pyralidae
- Genus: Oneida
- Species: O. marmorata

Binomial name
- Oneida marmorata Schaus, 1912

Species of moth

Oneida marmorata is a species of snout moth in the genus Oneida. It is found in Costa Rica.
