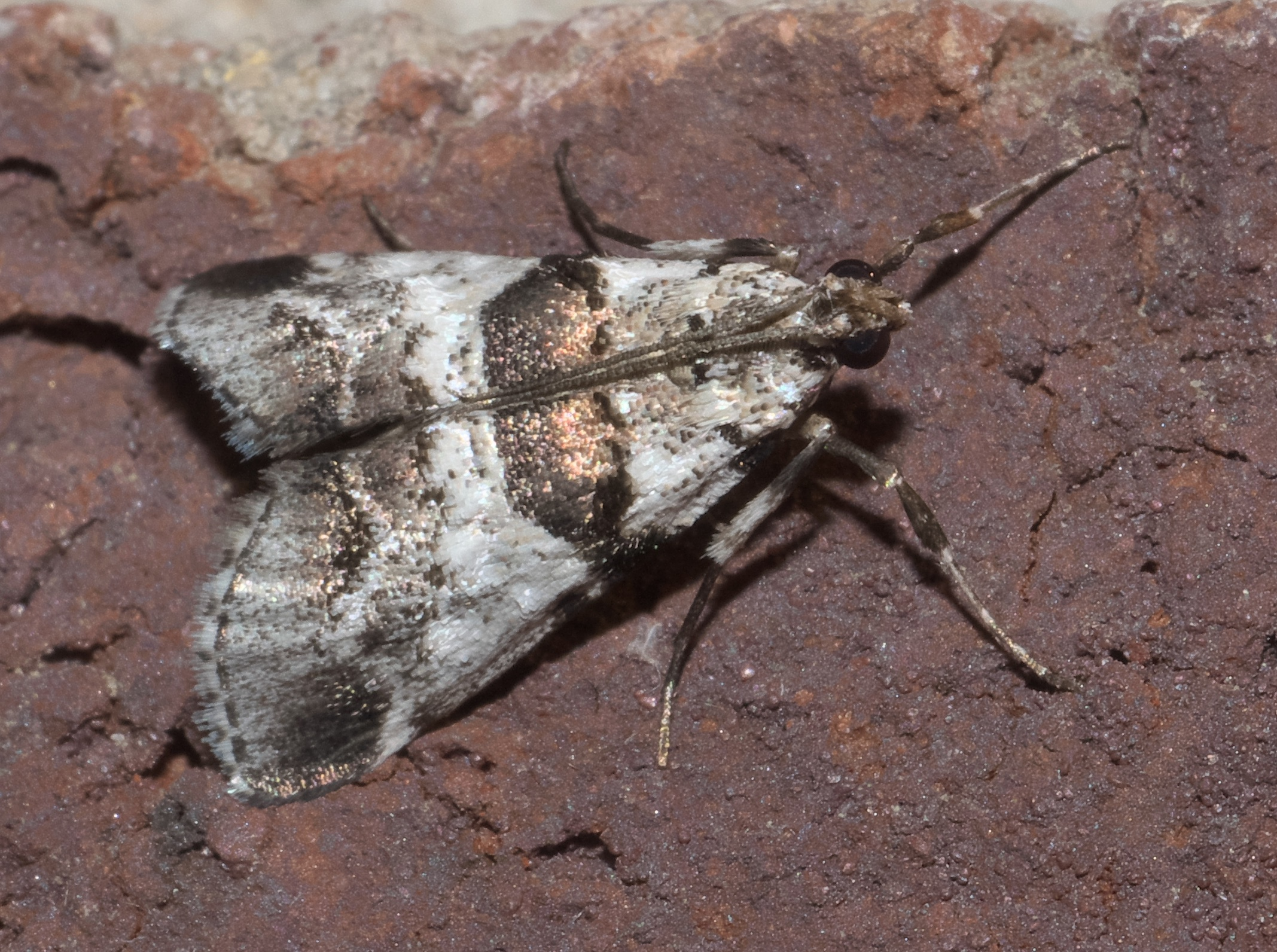

Scientific classification
- Kingdom: Animalia
- Phylum: Arthropoda
- Class: Insecta
- Order: Lepidoptera
- Family: Pyralidae
- Genus: Tallula
- Species: T. atrifascialis

Binomial name
- Tallula atrifascialis Hulst, 1886

= Tallula atrifascialis =

Species of moth

Tallula atrifascialis is a species of pyralid moth in the family Pyralidae.

The MONA or Hodges number for Tallula atrifascialis is 5591.

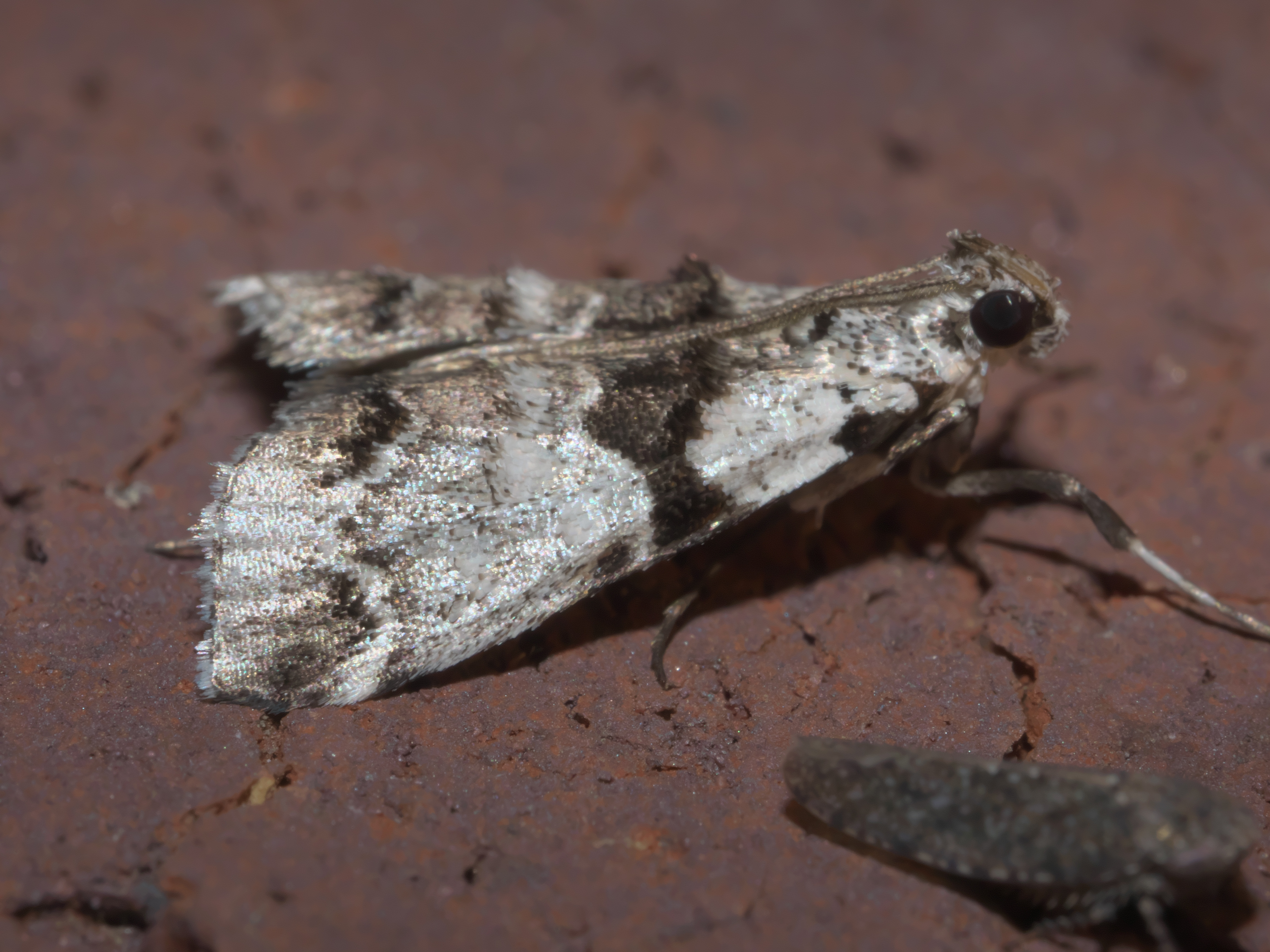
Tallula atrifascialis
