= Chloropaschia thermalis =

Scientific classification
- Kingdom: Animalia
- Phylum: Arthropoda
- Class: Insecta
- Order: Lepidoptera
- Family: Pyralidae
- Genus: Chloropaschia
- Species: C. thermalis

Binomial name
- Chloropaschia thermalis Hampson, 1906

Species of moth

Chloropaschia thermalis is a species of snout moth in the genus Chloropaschia. It was described by George Hampson in 1906. It is found in French Guiana.
