= Titanoceros viridibasalis =

Scientific classification
- Domain: Eukaryota
- Kingdom: Animalia
- Phylum: Arthropoda
- Class: Insecta
- Order: Lepidoptera
- Family: Pyralidae
- Genus: Titanoceros
- Species: T. viridibasalis

Binomial name
- Titanoceros viridibasalis (Caradja, 1932)

Synonyms
- Jocara viridibasalis Caradja, 1932

Species of moth

Titanoceros viridibasalis is a species of snout moth. It is found in China.
