= Omphalota =

Scientific classification
- Kingdom: Animalia
- Phylum: Arthropoda
- Class: Insecta
- Order: Lepidoptera
- Family: Pyralidae
- Subfamily: Epipaschiinae
- Genus: Omphalota; Hampson, 1899
- Species: O. chlorobasis

Binomial name
- Omphalota chlorobasis Hampson, 1899

Genus of moths

Omphalota is a monotypic snout moth genus. Its one species, Omphalota chlorobasis, was described by George Hampson in 1899. It is known from India (including Simla, the type location).
