= Milgithea rufiapicalis =

Scientific classification
- Kingdom: Animalia
- Phylum: Arthropoda
- Class: Insecta
- Order: Lepidoptera
- Family: Pyralidae
- Genus: Milgithea
- Species: M. rufiapicalis

Binomial name
- Milgithea rufiapicalis (Hampson, 1916)

Synonyms
- Jocara rufiapicalis Hampson, 1916

Species of moth

Milgithea rufiapicalis is a species of snout moth in the genus Milgithea. It is found in Central America.
