= Chloropaschia agathoa =

Scientific classification
- Domain: Eukaryota
- Kingdom: Animalia
- Phylum: Arthropoda
- Class: Insecta
- Order: Lepidoptera
- Family: Pyralidae
- Genus: Chloropaschia
- Species: C. agathoa

Binomial name
- Chloropaschia agathoa (Schaus, 1922)

Synonyms
- Jocara agathoa Schaus, 1922; Deuterollyta agathoa

Species of moth

Chloropaschia agathoa is a species of snout moth in the genus Chloropaschia. It is found in French Guiana.
