= Lepipaschia inornata =

Scientific classification
- Kingdom: Animalia
- Phylum: Arthropoda
- Clade: Pancrustacea
- Class: Insecta
- Order: Lepidoptera
- Family: Pyralidae
- Genus: Lepipaschia
- Species: L. inornata

Binomial name
- Lepipaschia inornata J. C. Shaffer & Solis, 1994

Species of moth

Lepipaschia inornata is a species of snout moth in the genus Lepipaschia. It was described by Jay C. Shaffer and Maria Alma Solis in 1994, and is known from the Aldabra Atoll and Madagascar.
