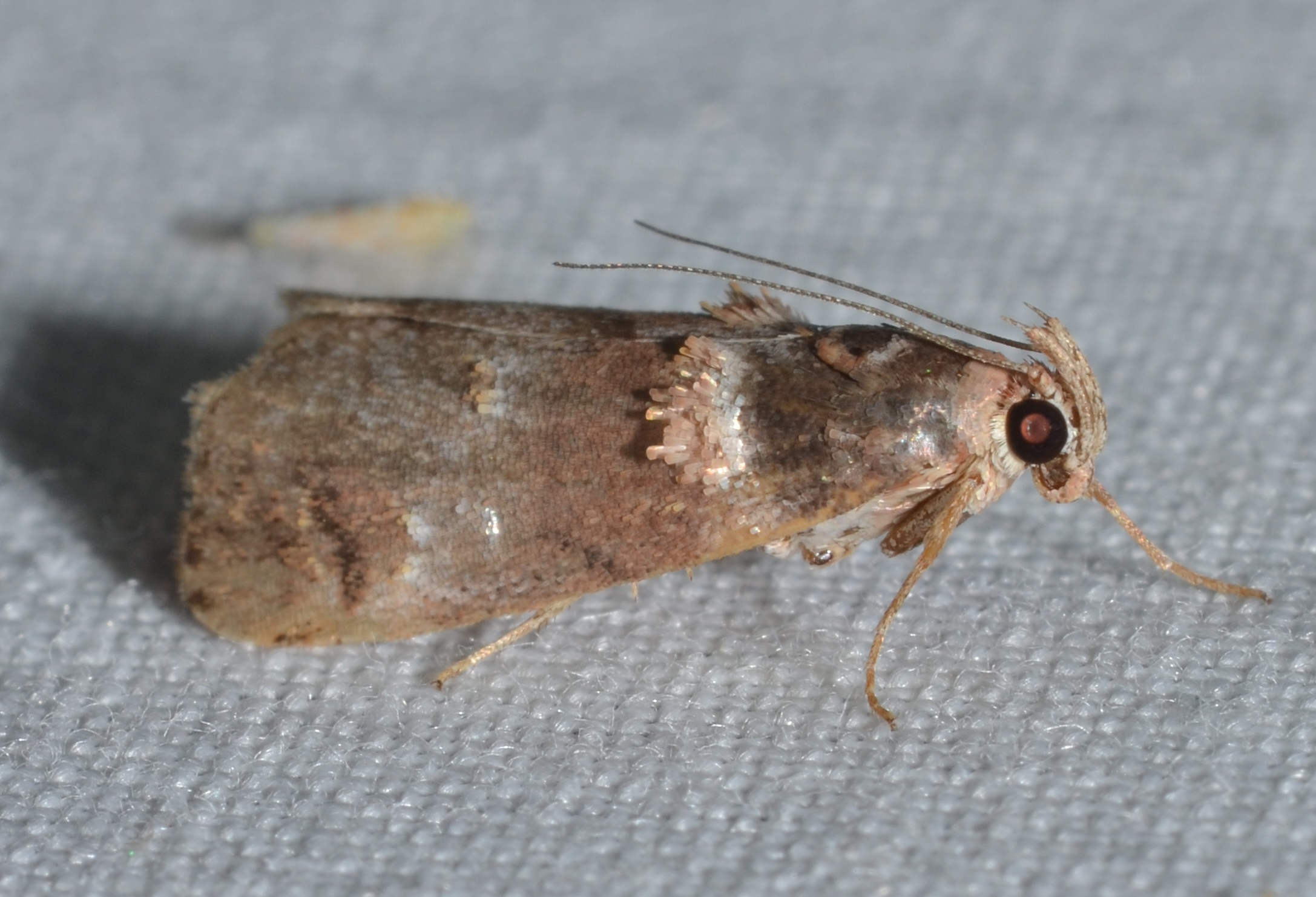

Scientific classification
- Domain: Eukaryota
- Kingdom: Animalia
- Phylum: Arthropoda
- Class: Insecta
- Order: Lepidoptera
- Family: Pyralidae
- Genus: Oneida
- Species: O. lunulalis

Binomial name
- Oneida lunulalis Hulst, 1889

= Oneida lunulalis =

Species of moth

Oneida lunulalis, the oak gall snout moth, is a species of snout moth in the genus Oneida. It is found in most of eastern North America, from Quebec and Ontario to Illinois and Florida.

The larvae feed on the leaves and galls on oak.
