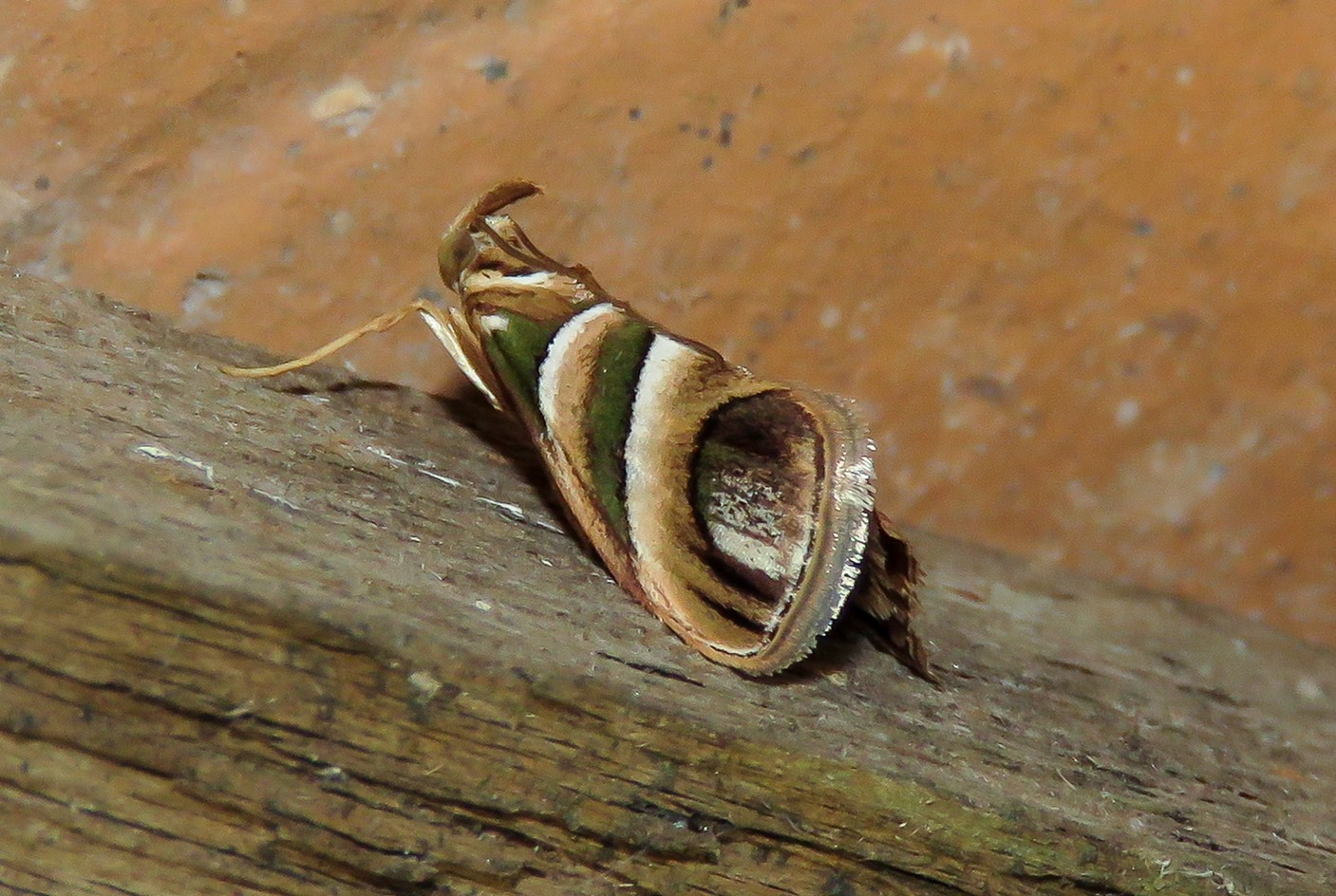

Scientific classification
- Domain: Eukaryota
- Kingdom: Animalia
- Phylum: Arthropoda
- Class: Insecta
- Order: Lepidoptera
- Family: Pyralidae
- Genus: Incarcha
- Species: I. aporalis

Binomial name
- Incarcha aporalis Dyar, 1910

= Incarcha aporalis =

Species of moth

Incarcha aporalis is a species of snout moth. It was described by Harrison Gray Dyar Jr. in 1910.
