= Anaeglis =

Scientific classification
- Kingdom: Animalia
- Phylum: Arthropoda
- Clade: Pancrustacea
- Class: Insecta
- Order: Lepidoptera
- Family: Pyralidae
- Subfamily: Epipaschiinae
- Genus: Anaeglis; Lederer, 1863
- Species: A. demissalis

Binomial name
- Anaeglis demissalis Lederer, 1863

Genus of moths

Anaeglis is a monotypic snout moth genus. It was described by Julius Lederer in 1863 and contains the species Anaeglis demissalis. It is found in Brazil.
