= Chloropaschia pegalis =

Scientific classification
- Domain: Eukaryota
- Kingdom: Animalia
- Phylum: Arthropoda
- Class: Insecta
- Order: Lepidoptera
- Family: Pyralidae
- Genus: Chloropaschia
- Species: C. pegalis

Binomial name
- Chloropaschia pegalis (Schaus, 1922)

Synonyms
- Macalla pegalis Schaus, 1922

Species of moth

Chloropaschia pegalis is a species of snout moth in the genus Chloropaschia. It is found in Guatemala.
