= Accinctapubes chionopheralis =

Scientific classification
- Kingdom: Animalia
- Phylum: Arthropoda
- Clade: Pancrustacea
- Class: Insecta
- Order: Lepidoptera
- Family: Pyralidae
- Genus: Accinctapubes
- Species: A. chionopheralis

Binomial name
- Accinctapubes chionopheralis (Hampson, 1906)

Synonyms
- Stericta chiopheralis Hampson, 1906

Species of moth

Accinctapubes chionopheralis is a species of snout moth in the genus Accinctapubes. It was described by George Hampson, in 1906. It is found from Costa Rica to Brazil, Bolivia, Colombia, Ecuador, Venezuela, French Guiana, Guyana, Paraguay and Peru.

The length of the forewings is 12–14 mm for males and 13–15 mm for females.
