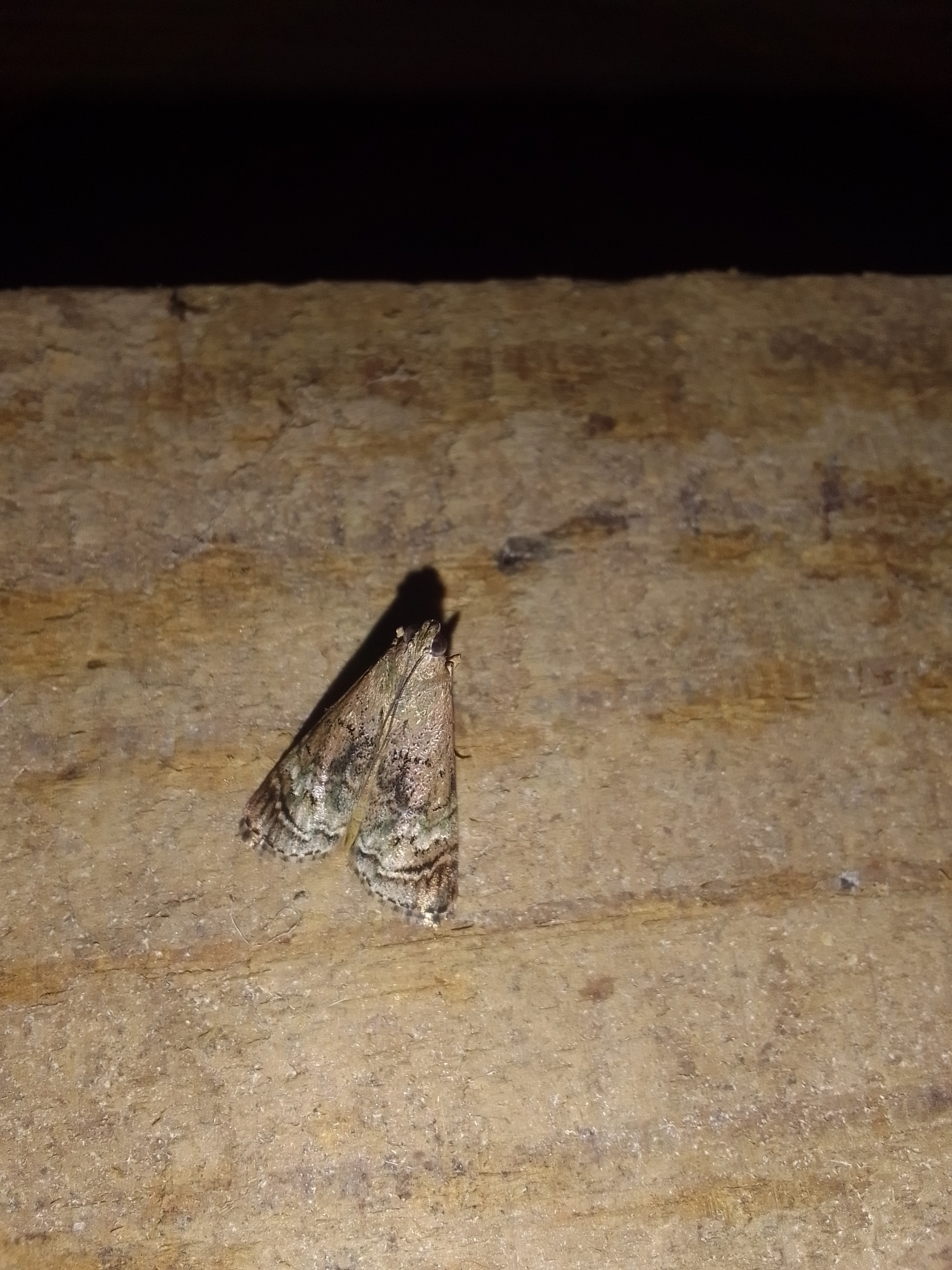

Scientific classification
- Kingdom: Animalia
- Phylum: Arthropoda
- Clade: Pancrustacea
- Class: Insecta
- Order: Lepidoptera
- Family: Pyralidae
- Genus: Chloropaschia
- Species: C. mennusalis

Binomial name
- Chloropaschia mennusalis Schaus, 1922

= Chloropaschia mennusalis =

Species of moth

Chloropaschia mennusalis is a species of snout moth in the genus Chloropaschia. It is found in French Guiana.
