= Mazdacis =

Scientific classification
- Kingdom: Animalia
- Phylum: Arthropoda
- Clade: Pancrustacea
- Class: Insecta
- Order: Lepidoptera
- Family: Pyralidae
- Subfamily: Epipaschiinae
- Genus: Mazdacis; Solis, 1993

Genus of moths

Mazdacis is a genus of snout moths. The genus was erected by Maria Alma Solis in 1993.

== Species ==
- Mazdacis consimilis
- Mazdacis flavomarginata
- Mazdacis zenoa
