= Mazdacis zenoa =

Scientific classification
- Kingdom: Animalia
- Phylum: Arthropoda
- Class: Insecta
- Order: Lepidoptera
- Family: Pyralidae
- Genus: Mazdacis
- Species: M. zenoa

Binomial name
- Mazdacis zenoa (Schaus, 1925)

Synonyms
- Chloropaschia zenoa Schaus, 1925

Species of moth

Mazdacis zenoa is a species of snout moth in the genus Mazdacis. It was described by Schaus in 1925. It is found in South America.
