= Axiocrita =

Scientific classification
- Kingdom: Animalia
- Phylum: Arthropoda
- Clade: Pancrustacea
- Class: Insecta
- Order: Lepidoptera
- Family: Pyralidae
- Subfamily: Epipaschiinae
- Genus: Axiocrita; Turner, 1913
- Species: A. cataphanes

Binomial name
- Axiocrita cataphanes Turner, 1913

Synonyms
- Jocara cataphanes

Genus of moths

Axiocrita is a monotypic snout moth genus. It was described by Alfred Jefferis Turner in 1913 and contains the species Axiocrita cataphanes. It is found in Australia.
