= Titanoceros cataxantha =

Scientific classification
- Kingdom: Animalia
- Phylum: Arthropoda
- Class: Insecta
- Order: Lepidoptera
- Family: Pyralidae
- Genus: Titanoceros
- Species: T. cataxantha

Binomial name
- Titanoceros cataxantha Meyrick, 1884

Species of moth

Titanoceros cataxantha is a species of snout moth described by Edward Meyrick in 1884. It is found in Australia.

The larvae feed on Eucalyptus species.
