= Calybitia =

Scientific classification
- Domain: Eukaryota
- Kingdom: Animalia
- Phylum: Arthropoda
- Class: Insecta
- Order: Lepidoptera
- Family: Pyralidae
- Subfamily: Epipaschiinae
- Genus: Calybitia; Schaus, 1922
- Species: C. adolescens

Binomial name
- Calybitia adolescens Schaus, 1922

Genus of moths

Calybitia is a monotypic snout moth genus. It was described by William Schaus in 1922 and contains the species Calybitia adolescens which is found in Guatemala.
