= Lacalma ferrealis =

Scientific classification
- Kingdom: Animalia
- Phylum: Arthropoda
- Class: Insecta
- Order: Lepidoptera
- Family: Pyralidae
- Genus: Lacalma
- Species: L. ferrealis

Binomial name
- Lacalma ferrealis (Hampson, 1906)

Synonyms
- Orthaga ferrealis Hampson, 1906

Species of moth

Lacalma ferrealis is a species of snout moth in the genus Lacalma. It was described by George Hampson in 1906 and is known from Australia, including Queensland.

The wingspan is about 30 mm. The forewings are dark green speckled with white, while the hindwings are plain brown.
