= Titanoceros mirandalis =

Scientific classification
- Domain: Eukaryota
- Kingdom: Animalia
- Phylum: Arthropoda
- Class: Insecta
- Order: Lepidoptera
- Family: Pyralidae
- Genus: Titanoceros
- Species: T. mirandalis

Binomial name
- Titanoceros mirandalis (Caradja, 1925)

Synonyms
- Jocara mirandalis Caradja, 1925

Species of moth

Titanoceros mirandalis is a species of snout moth. It is found in China.
