= Incarcha argentilinea =

Scientific classification
- Kingdom: Animalia
- Phylum: Arthropoda
- Class: Insecta
- Order: Lepidoptera
- Family: Pyralidae
- Genus: Incarcha
- Species: I. argentilinea

Binomial name
- Incarcha argentilinea H. Druce, 1910

Synonyms
- Macalla argentilinea H. Druce, 1910

Species of moth

Incarcha argentilinea is a species of snout moth found in Peru. It was first described by Herbert Druce in 1910.
