= Cecidipta cecidiptoides =

Scientific classification
- Kingdom: Animalia
- Phylum: Arthropoda
- Class: Insecta
- Order: Lepidoptera
- Family: Pyralidae
- Genus: Cecidipta
- Species: C. cecidiptoides

Binomial name
- Cecidipta cecidiptoides (Schaus, 1925)

Synonyms
- Stericta cecidiptoides Schaus, 1925

Species of moth

Cecidipta cecidiptoides is a species of snout moth in the genus Cecidipta.

== Distribution ==
It is found in South America.
