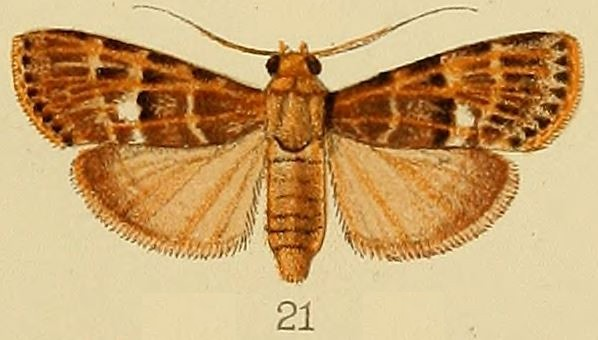

Scientific classification
- Domain: Eukaryota
- Kingdom: Animalia
- Phylum: Arthropoda
- Class: Insecta
- Order: Lepidoptera
- Family: Pyralidae
- Genus: Lacalma
- Species: L. porphyrealis

Binomial name
- Lacalma porphyrealis (Kenrick, 1907)

Synonyms
- Macalla porphyrealis Kenrick, 1907; Lacalma poryphryealis M. Shaffer, Nielsen & Horak, 1996

= Lacalma porphyrealis =

Species of moth

Lacalma porphyrealis is a species of snout moth in the genus Lacalma. It was described by George Hamilton Kenrick in 1907 and is known from New Guinea and Australia.
