= Canipsa pyraliata =

Scientific classification
- Domain: Eukaryota
- Kingdom: Animalia
- Phylum: Arthropoda
- Class: Insecta
- Order: Lepidoptera
- Family: Pyralidae
- Genus: Canipsa
- Species: C. pyraliata

Binomial name
- Canipsa pyraliata (Moore, 1888)

Synonyms
- Scopocera pyraliata Moore, 1888; Stericta pyraliata

Species of moth

Canipsa pyraliata is a species of snout moth. It was described by Frederic Moore in 1888 and is found in India.
