= Apocera costata =

Scientific classification
- Domain: Eukaryota
- Kingdom: Animalia
- Phylum: Arthropoda
- Class: Insecta
- Order: Lepidoptera
- Family: Pyralidae
- Genus: Apocera
- Species: A. costata

Binomial name
- Apocera costata Schaus, 1912

Species of moth

Apocera costata is a species of snout moth in the genus Apocera. It was described by William Schaus in 1912. It is found in Costa Rica.
