= Chloropaschia hollandalis =

Scientific classification
- Domain: Eukaryota
- Kingdom: Animalia
- Phylum: Arthropoda
- Class: Insecta
- Order: Lepidoptera
- Family: Pyralidae
- Genus: Chloropaschia
- Species: C. hollandalis

Binomial name
- Chloropaschia hollandalis Schaus, 1925

Species of moth

Chloropaschia hollandalis is a species of snout moth in the genus Chloropaschia. It is found in South America.
