= Lacalma mniomima =

Scientific classification
- Domain: Eukaryota
- Kingdom: Animalia
- Phylum: Arthropoda
- Class: Insecta
- Order: Lepidoptera
- Family: Pyralidae
- Genus: Lacalma
- Species: L. mniomima

Binomial name
- Lacalma mniomima (Turner, 1912)

Synonyms
- Macalla mniomima Turner, 1912

Species of moth

Lacalma mniomima is a species of snout moth in the genus Lacalma. It was described by Alfred Jefferis Turner in 1912 and is known from Australia, including Queensland.
