= Lepipaschia limbata =

Scientific classification
- Kingdom: Animalia
- Phylum: Arthropoda
- Clade: Pancrustacea
- Class: Insecta
- Order: Lepidoptera
- Family: Pyralidae
- Genus: Lepipaschia
- Species: L. limbata

Binomial name
- Lepipaschia limbata J. C. Shaffer & Solis, 1994

Species of moth

Lepipaschia limbata is a species of snout moth in the genus Lepipaschia. It was described by Jay C. Shaffer and M. Alma Solis in 1994. It is known from Burkina Faso, West Africa.
