= Odontopaschia virescens =

Scientific classification
- Kingdom: Animalia
- Phylum: Arthropoda
- Class: Insecta
- Order: Lepidoptera
- Family: Pyralidae
- Genus: Odontopaschia
- Species: O. virescens

Binomial name
- Odontopaschia virescens Hampson, 1903

Species of moth

Odontopaschia virescens is a species of snout moth in the genus Odontopaschia. It was described by George Hampson in 1903. It is found in northern India.
