= Canipsa =

Scientific classification
- Kingdom: Animalia
- Phylum: Arthropoda
- Class: Insecta
- Order: Lepidoptera
- Family: Pyralidae
- Subfamily: Epipaschiinae
- Genus: Canipsa; Walker, 1866

Synonyms
- Scopocera Moore, 1888; Sarama Moore, 1888

Genus of moths

Canipsa is a genus of snout moths. It was described by Francis Walker in 1866. It is listed as a synonym of Stericta by some authors.

== Species ==
- Canipsa atkinsonii (Moore, 1888)
- Canipsa poliochyta (Turner, 1904)
- Canipsa pyraliata (Moore, 1888)
- Canipsa subpensalis Walker, 1866
