= Chloropaschia adesia =

Scientific classification
- Domain: Eukaryota
- Kingdom: Animalia
- Phylum: Arthropoda
- Class: Insecta
- Order: Lepidoptera
- Family: Pyralidae
- Genus: Chloropaschia
- Species: C. adesia

Binomial name
- Chloropaschia adesia

Species of moth

Chloropaschia adesia is a species of snout moth in the genus Chloropaschia.
