= Apocera colorata =

Scientific classification
- Kingdom: Animalia
- Phylum: Arthropoda
- Class: Insecta
- Order: Lepidoptera
- Family: Pyralidae
- Genus: Apocera
- Species: A. colorata

Binomial name
- Apocera colorata (Dyar, 1914)

Synonyms
- Arnatula colorata Dyar, 1914; Noctuides colorata

Species of moth

Apocera colorata is a species of snout moth in the genus Apocera. It is found in Central America.
