= Chloropaschia hemileuca =

Scientific classification
- Domain: Eukaryota
- Kingdom: Animalia
- Phylum: Arthropoda
- Class: Insecta
- Order: Lepidoptera
- Family: Pyralidae
- Genus: Chloropaschia
- Species: C. hemileuca

Binomial name
- Chloropaschia hemileuca (Dognin, 1910)

Synonyms
- Stericta hemileuca Dognin, 1910

Species of moth

Chloropaschia hemileuca is a species of snout moth in the genus Chloropaschia. It is found in French Guiana.
