= Carthara =

Scientific classification
- Kingdom: Animalia
- Phylum: Arthropoda
- Class: Insecta
- Order: Lepidoptera
- Family: Pyralidae
- Subfamily: Epipaschiinae
- Genus: Carthara; Walker, 1865

Synonyms
- Leptosphetta Butler, 1878; Pycnulia Zeller, 1881

Genus of moths

Carthara is a genus of snout moths. It was described by Francis Walker in 1865 and is known from Colombia.

== Species ==
- Carthara abrupta Zeller, 1881
- Carthara albicosta Walker, 1865
