= Milgithea suramisa =

Scientific classification
- Kingdom: Animalia
- Phylum: Arthropoda
- Class: Insecta
- Order: Lepidoptera
- Family: Pyralidae
- Genus: Milgithea
- Species: M. suramisa

Binomial name
- Milgithea suramisa Schaus, 1922

Species of moth

Milgithea suramisa is a species of snout moth in the genus Milgithea. It is found in Costa Rica.
