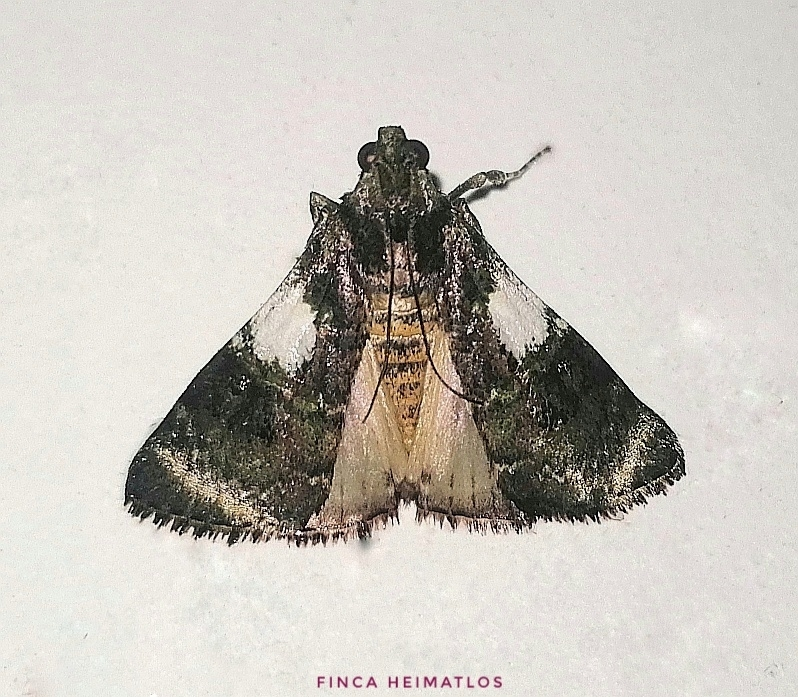
- Accinctapubes albifasciata

Scientific classification
- Kingdom: Animalia
- Phylum: Arthropoda
- Clade: Pancrustacea
- Class: Insecta
- Order: Lepidoptera
- Family: Pyralidae
- Subfamily: Epipaschiinae
- Genus: Accinctapubes; Solis, 1993

= Accinctapubes =

Genus of moths

Accinctapubes is a genus of snout moths in the subfamily Epipaschiinae. It was described by Maria Alma Solis in 1993 and it is known from Costa Rica and Paraguay.

== Species ==
- Accinctapubes albifasciata (Druce, 1902)
- Accinctapubes amplissima (Solis & Styer, 2003)
- Accinctapubes apicalis (Schaus, 1906)
- Accinctapubes chionopheralis Hampson, 1906
