= Accinctapubes apicalis =

Scientific classification
- Domain: Eukaryota
- Kingdom: Animalia
- Phylum: Arthropoda
- Class: Insecta
- Order: Lepidoptera
- Family: Pyralidae
- Genus: Accinctapubes
- Species: A. apicalis

Binomial name
- Accinctapubes apicalis (Schaus, 1906)

Synonyms
- Jocara apicalis Schaus, 1906; Stericta apicalis; Cecidipta elphegealis Schaus, 1934

Species of moth

Accinctapubes apicalis is a species of snout moth in the genus Accinctapubes. It was described by William Schaus in 1906, and is known from southern Mexico, Brazil, Bolivia, Ecuador, and Venezuela.
