= Odontopaschia ecnomia =

Scientific classification
- Kingdom: Animalia
- Phylum: Arthropoda
- Class: Insecta
- Order: Lepidoptera
- Family: Pyralidae
- Genus: Odontopaschia
- Species: O. ecnomia

Binomial name
- Odontopaschia ecnomia Turner, 1913

Species of moth

Odontopaschia ecnomia is a species of snout moth in the genus Odontopaschia. It was described by Turner in 1913, and is known from Queensland, Australia.
