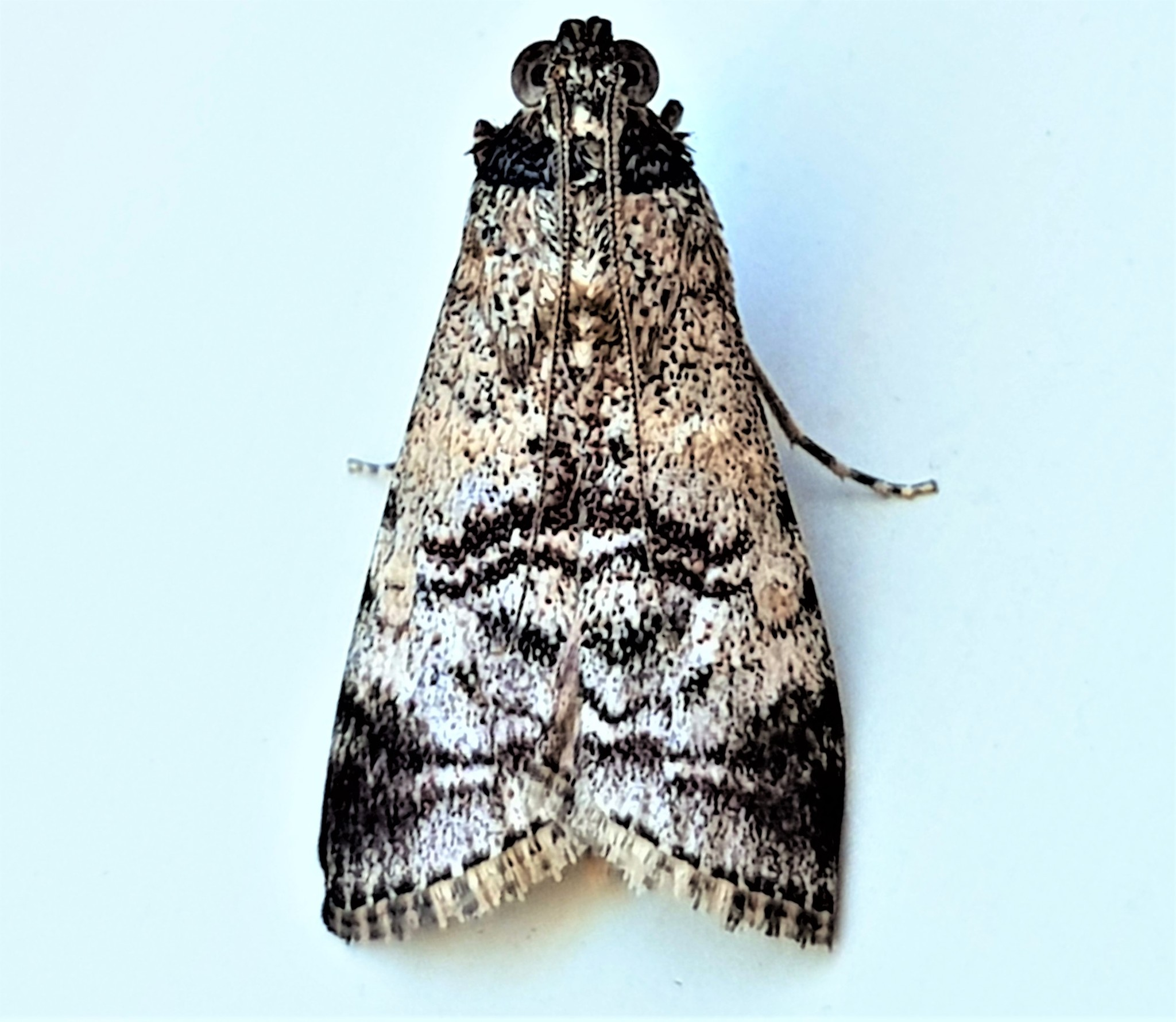

Scientific classification
- Kingdom: Animalia
- Phylum: Arthropoda
- Clade: Pancrustacea
- Class: Insecta
- Order: Lepidoptera
- Family: Pyralidae
- Genus: Chloropaschia
- Species: C. granitalis

Binomial name
- Chloropaschia granitalis (C. Felder, R. Felder & Rogenhofer, 1875)

Synonyms
- Homura granitalis C. Felder, R. Felder & Rogenhofer, 1875

= Chloropaschia granitalis =

Species of moth

Chloropaschia granitalis is a species of snout moth in the family Pyralidae. It was first described by Cajetan Felder, Rudolf Felder and Alois Friedrich Rogenhofer in 1875 and is known from Brazil.
