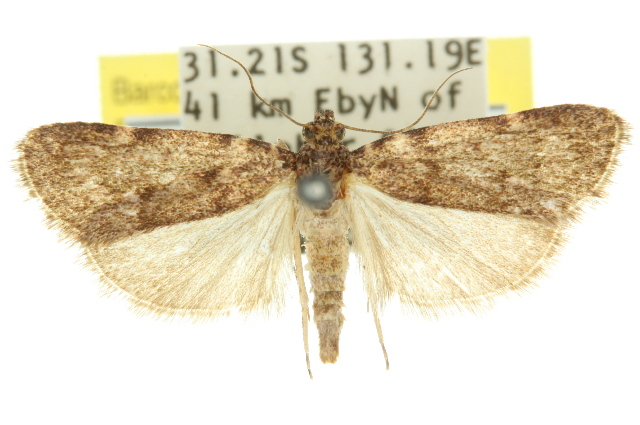
- Araeopaschia demotis

Scientific classification
- Kingdom: Animalia
- Phylum: Arthropoda
- Class: Insecta
- Order: Lepidoptera
- Family: Pyralidae
- Genus: Araeopaschia
- Species: A. demotis

Binomial name
- Araeopaschia demotis (Meyrick, 1887)

Synonyms
- Stericta demotis Meyrick, 1887

= Araeopaschia demotis =

Species of moth

Araeopaschia demotis is a species of snout moth in the genus Araeopaschia. It was described by Edward Meyrick in 1887 and is known from Australia.
