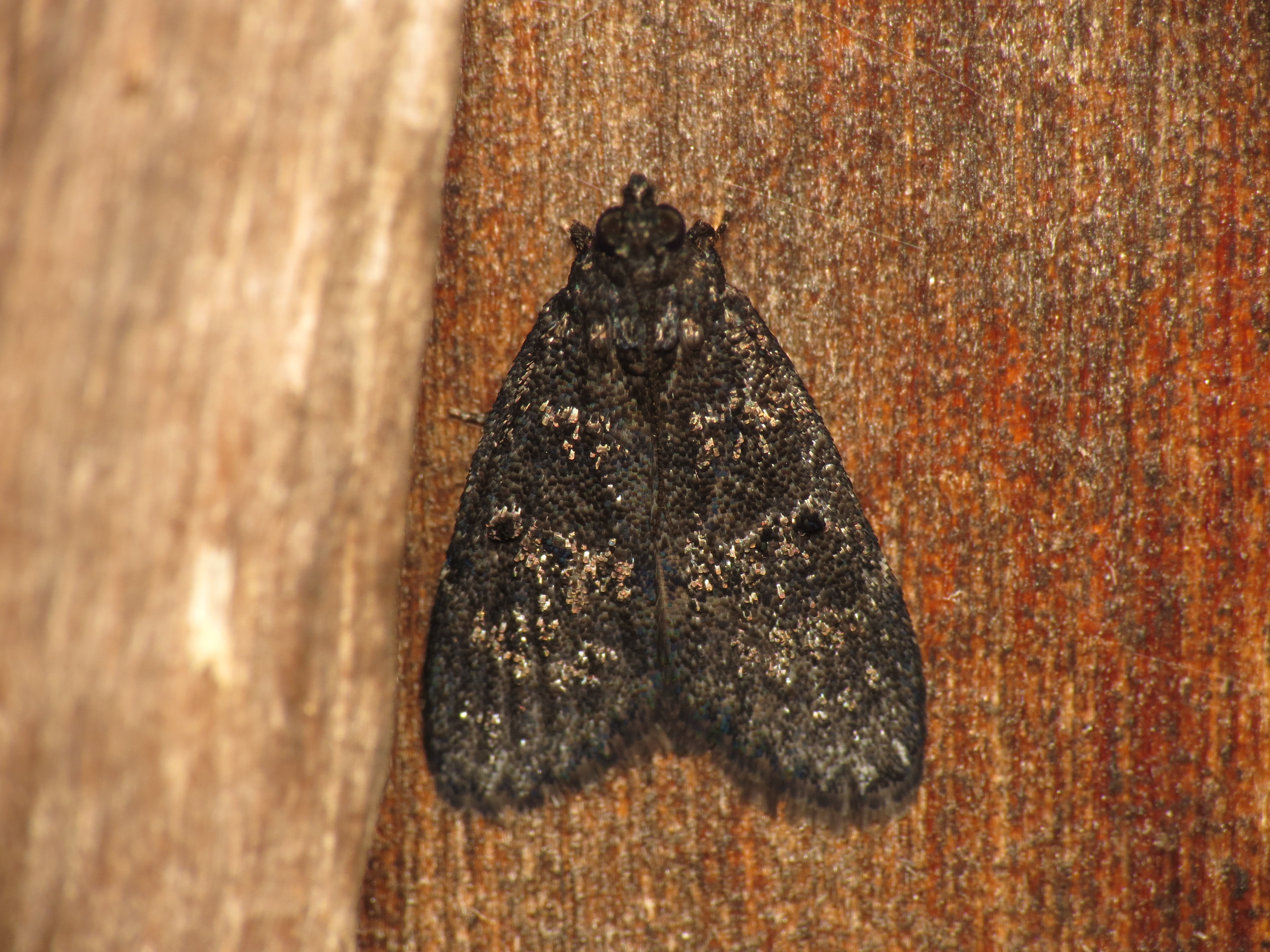
- Catamola xanthomelalis

Scientific classification
- Kingdom: Animalia
- Phylum: Arthropoda
- Class: Insecta
- Order: Lepidoptera
- Family: Pyralidae
- Subfamily: Epipaschiinae
- Genus: Catamola; Meyrick, 1884

Synonyms
- Elaphernis Meyrick, 1936

= Catamola =

Genus of moths

Catamola is a genus of snout moths. It was erected by Edward Meyrick in 1884 and is known from Australia.

== Species ==
- Catamola funerea (Walker, 1863)
- Catamola xanthomelalis (Walker, 1863)
