= Austropaschia =

Scientific classification
- Kingdom: Animalia
- Phylum: Arthropoda
- Class: Insecta
- Order: Lepidoptera
- Family: Pyralidae
- Subfamily: Epipaschiinae
- Genus: Austropaschia; Hampson, 1916
- Species: A. porrigens

Binomial name
- Austropaschia porrigens Hampson, 1916

Genus of moths

Austropaschia is a monotypic snout moth genus. It was described by George Hampson in 1916, and contains the species Austropaschia porrigens. It is found in Australia.
