= Heminomistis =

Scientific classification
- Kingdom: Animalia
- Phylum: Arthropoda
- Class: Insecta
- Order: Lepidoptera
- Family: Pyralidae
- Subfamily: Epipaschiinae
- Genus: Heminomistis; Meyrick, 1933
- Species: H. melanthes

Binomial name
- Heminomistis melanthes Meyrick, 1933

Genus of moths

Heminomistis is a monotypic snout moth genus in the family Pyralidae. Its only species, Heminomistis melanthes, is known from Thailand. Both the genus and species were first described by Edward Meyrick in 1933.
