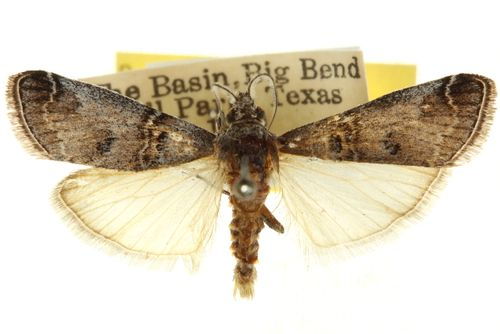
- Oneida grisiella

Scientific classification
- Kingdom: Animalia
- Phylum: Arthropoda
- Class: Insecta
- Order: Lepidoptera
- Family: Pyralidae
- Subfamily: Epipaschiinae
- Genus: Oneida; Hulst, 1889

= Oneida (moth) =

Genus of moths

Oneida is a genus of snout moths. It was described by George Duryea Hulst in 1889.

== Species ==
- Oneida antilocha Meyrick, 1936 (from Brazil, Santa Catarina)
- Oneida grisiella Solis, 1991 (from Texas)
- Oneida luniferella Hulst, 1895 (from USA/Mexico)
- Oneida lunulalis Hulst, 1887 (from USA and Canada)
- Oneida marmorata Schaus, 1912 (from Costa Rica)
- Oneida mejona Schaus, 1922 (from Central America)
