= Leptoses =

Scientific classification
- Kingdom: Animalia
- Phylum: Arthropoda
- Class: Insecta
- Order: Lepidoptera
- Family: Pyralidae
- Subfamily: Epipaschiinae
- Genus: Leptoses; Ghesquière, 1942
- Species: L. sophronicos

Binomial name
- Leptoses sophronicos Ghesquière, 1942

Genus of moths

Leptoses is a monotypic snout moth genus described by Jean Ghesquière in 1942. Its only species, Leptoses sophronicos, described by the same author in the same year, is known from the Democratic Republic of the Congo (including Elisabethville, the type location).
