= Chloropaschia selecta =

Scientific classification
- Domain: Eukaryota
- Kingdom: Animalia
- Phylum: Arthropoda
- Class: Insecta
- Order: Lepidoptera
- Family: Pyralidae
- Genus: Chloropaschia
- Species: C. selecta

Binomial name
- Chloropaschia selecta (Schaus, 1912)

Synonyms
- Macalla selecta Schaus, 1912

Species of moth

Chloropaschia selecta is a species of snout moth in the genus Chloropaschia. It is found in Costa Rica.
