= Lacalma argenteorubra =

Scientific classification
- Kingdom: Animalia
- Phylum: Arthropoda
- Clade: Pancrustacea
- Class: Insecta
- Order: Lepidoptera
- Family: Pyralidae
- Genus: Lacalma
- Species: L. argenteorubra

Binomial name
- Lacalma argenteorubra (Hampson, 1916)

Synonyms
- Macalla argenteorubra Hampson, 1916

Species of moth

Lacalma argenteorubra is a species of snout moth in the genus Lacalma. It was described by George Hampson in 1916 and is known from New Guinea.

The wingspan is about 40 mm.
