= Milgithea melanoleuca =

Scientific classification
- Kingdom: Animalia
- Phylum: Arthropoda
- Class: Insecta
- Order: Lepidoptera
- Family: Pyralidae
- Genus: Milgithea
- Species: M. melanoleuca

Binomial name
- Milgithea melanoleuca Hampson, 1896

Synonyms
- Prococera melanoleuca Hampson, 1896

Species of moth

Milgithea melanoleuca is a species of snout moth in the genus Milgithea. It was described by George Hampson in 1896. It is found in Colombia.
