= Anarnatula subflavida =

Scientific classification
- Kingdom: Animalia
- Phylum: Arthropoda
- Class: Insecta
- Order: Lepidoptera
- Family: Pyralidae
- Genus: Anarnatula
- Species: A. subflavida

Binomial name
- Anarnatula subflavida (Dyar, 1914)

Synonyms
- Arnatula subflavida Dyar, 1914

Species of moth

Anarnatula subflavida is a species of snout moth in the genus Anarnatula. It was described by Harrison Gray Dyar Jr. in 1914, and is known from Panama and Costa Rica.
