= Apocera zographica =

Scientific classification
- Domain: Eukaryota
- Kingdom: Animalia
- Phylum: Arthropoda
- Class: Insecta
- Order: Lepidoptera
- Family: Pyralidae
- Genus: Apocera
- Species: A. zographica

Binomial name
- Apocera zographica (Dyar, 1913)

Synonyms
- Paranatula zographica Dyar, 1913

Species of moth

Apocera zographica is a species of snout moth in the genus Apocera. It was described by Harrison Gray Dyar Jr. in 1913. It is found in Mexico, Venezuela and Argentina.

The larvae have been recorded feeding on Cardiospermum grandiflorum. The tie the leaves of their host plant together and feed from within.
