= Cecidipta =

Scientific classification
- Kingdom: Animalia
- Phylum: Arthropoda
- Clade: Pancrustacea
- Class: Insecta
- Order: Lepidoptera
- Family: Pyralidae
- Subfamily: Epipaschiinae
- Genus: Cecidipta; Berg, 1877

Synonyms
- Acecidipta Amsel, 1956; Earoctenis Meyrick, 1936

Genus of moths

Cecidipta is a genus of snout moths. It was described by Carlos Berg in 1877, and is known from South America.

== Species ==
- Cecidipta cecidiptoides (Schaus, 1925) (from Bolivia)
- Cecidipta excoecariae Berg, 1877 (from Mexico)
- Cecidipta major (Amsel, 1956) (from Venezuela)
- Cecidipta teffealis (Schaus, 1922) (from Téfe, Brazil)
