= Mazdacis flavomarginata =

Scientific classification
- Kingdom: Animalia
- Phylum: Arthropoda
- Class: Insecta
- Order: Lepidoptera
- Family: Pyralidae
- Genus: Mazdacis
- Species: M. flavomarginata

Binomial name
- Mazdacis flavomarginata (H. Druce, 1902)

Synonyms
- Stericta flavomarginata H. Druce, 1902; Auradisa soteris Schaus, 1922

Species of moth

Mazdacis flavomarginata is a species of snout moth in the genus Mazdacis. It was described by Herbert Druce in 1902, and is known from Guyana and French Guiana.
