= Apocera vincentia =

Scientific classification
- Domain: Eukaryota
- Kingdom: Animalia
- Phylum: Arthropoda
- Class: Insecta
- Order: Lepidoptera
- Family: Pyralidae
- Genus: Apocera
- Species: A. vincentia

Binomial name
- Apocera vincentia (Schaus, 1922)

Synonyms
- Paranatula vincentia Schaus, 1922

Species of moth

Apocera vincentia is a species of snout moth in the genus Apocera. It is found in Guatemala.
