= Apocera =

Scientific classification
- Domain: Eukaryota
- Kingdom: Animalia
- Phylum: Arthropoda
- Class: Insecta
- Order: Lepidoptera
- Family: Pyralidae
- Subfamily: Epipaschiinae
- Genus: Apocera; Schaus, 1912

Synonyms
- Paranatula Dyar, 1913

Genus of moths

Apocera is a genus of snout moths. It was described by William Schaus in 1912.

== Species ==
- Apocera colorata (Dyar, 1914)
- Apocera costata Schaus, 1912
- Apocera vincentia (Schaus, 1922)
- Apocera zographica (Dyar, 1913)
