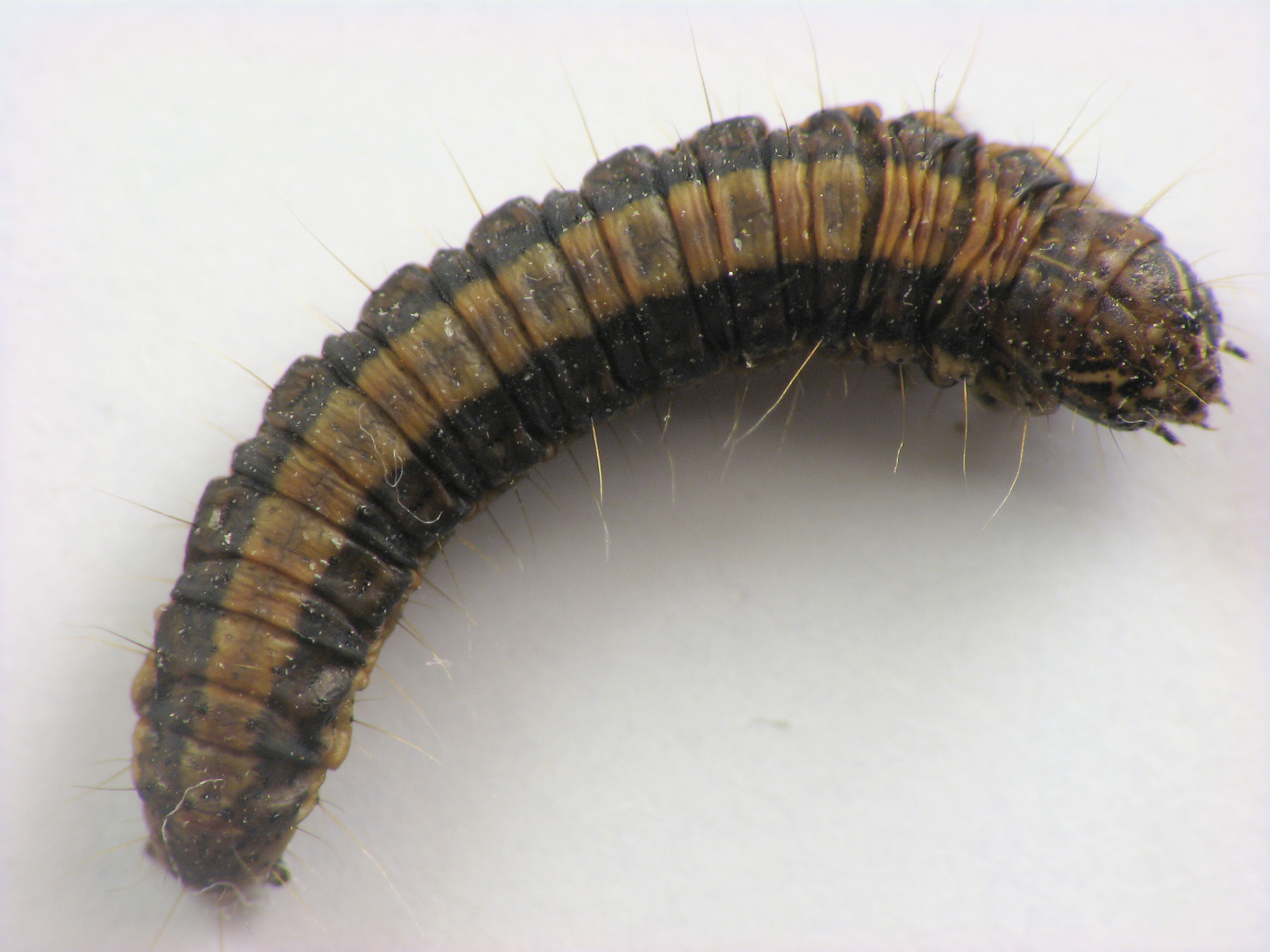
- Caterpillar of Pococera sp. on sweetgum

Scientific classification
- Kingdom: Animalia
- Phylum: Arthropoda
- Clade: Pancrustacea
- Class: Insecta
- Order: Lepidoptera
- Family: Pyralidae
- Subfamily: Epipaschiinae; Meyrick, 1884

Type species
- Epipaschia superatalis Clemens, 1860

Diversity
- 91 genera

Synonyms
- Pococerinae Hampson, 1918

= Epipaschiinae =

Subfamily of moths

The Epipaschiinae are a subfamily of snout moths (family Pyralidae). More than 720 species are known today, which are found mainly in the tropics and subtropics. Some occur in temperate regions, but the subfamily is apparently completely absent from Europe, at least as native species. A few Epipaschiinae are crop pests that may occasionally become economically significant.

== Description and ecology ==
Adult females are often hard to distinguish from related lineages, and even the larvae do not possess the characteristic sclerotized bristle base near the start of the abdomen, whose position is a tell-tale mark of the other subfamilies of Pyralidae.

By contrast, the adult males of Epipaschiinae are easier to recognize, and three of their traits support the assumption that Epipaschiinae are a natural, monophyletic group:

1. an always upturned and pointed third segment of the labial palpi
2. a ventrally curved phallobase of the male which usually extends beyond the ductus ejaculatorius
3. the weakly sclerotized tegumen

In addition, in most cases the adult males of this subfamily have a conspicuous scaled projection from the scape of the antennae.

The caterpillar larvae are leaf rollers, leaf tiers and leaf miners. As pests, they infest such diverse plants as Persea americana (avocado), Swietenia (mahoganies), or Zea mays (corn). However, they are usually a mere nuisance and do not cause large-scale crop failure.

== Systematics ==
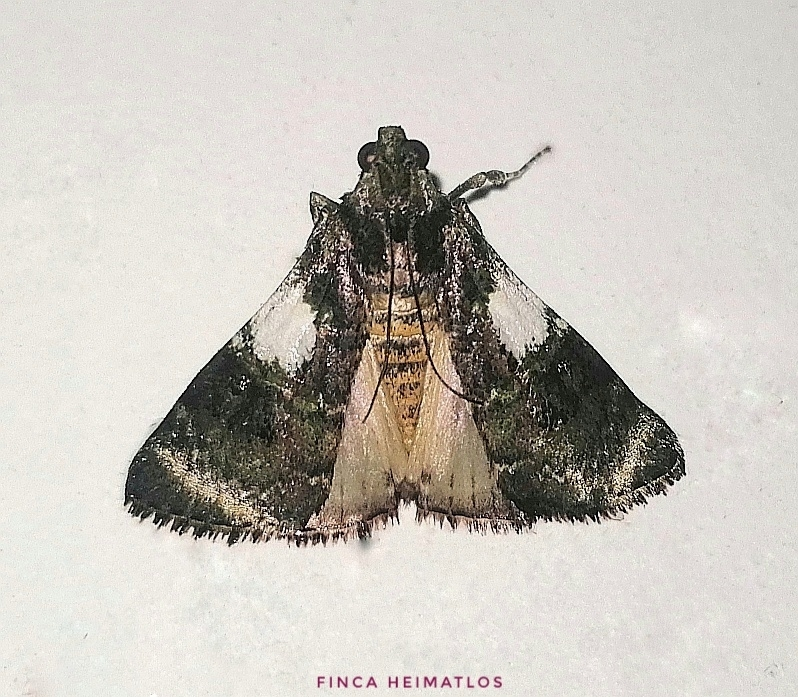
Accinctapubes albifasciata

Alma Solis (1993) provided a phylogenetic analysis of 20 genera of the Pococera complex, consisting of some 300 species in the Western Hemisphere.

- Accinctapubes Solis, 1993
- Agastophanes Turner, 1937
- Anaeglis Lederer, 1863
- Anarnatula Dyar, 1918
- Anexophana Viette, 1960
- Apocera Schaus, 1912 (= Paranatula Dyar, 1913)
- Araeopaschia Hampson, 1906 (= Aroeopaschia Amsel, 1956)
- Astrapometis Meyrick, 1884
- Austropaschia Hampson, 1916
- Axiocrita Turner, 1913
- Bibasilaris Solis, 1993
- Cacozelia Grote, 1878
- Calybitia Schaus, 1922
- Canipsa Walker, 1866 (= Sarama Moore, 1888, Scopocera Moore, 1888)
- Carthara Walker, 1865 (= Leptosphetta Butler, 1878, Pycnulia Zeller, 1881)
- Catalaodes Viette, 1953
- Catamola Meyrick, 1884 (= Elaphernis Meyrick, 1936)
- Cecidipta Berg, 1877 (= Acecidipta Amsel, 1956)
- Chloropaschia Hampson, 1906
- Coenodomus Walsingham, 1888 (= Alippa Aurivillius, 1894, Dyaria Neumoegen, 1893)
- Dasyvesica Solis, 1991
- Deuterollyta Lederer, 1863 (= Ajacania Schaus, 1925, Ajocara Schaus, 1925, Oedomia Dognin, 1906, Winona Hulst, 1888)
- Doddiana Turner, 1902
- Elisabethinia Ghesquière, 1942
- Ephedrophila Dumont, 1928
- Epilepia Janse, 1931
- Epipaschia Clemens, 1860
- Eublemmodes Gaede, 1917
- Geropaschia Hampson, 1917 (= Araeopaschia Hampson, 1916)
- Glossopaschia Dyar, 1914
- Heminomistis Meyrick, 1933
- Homura Lederer, 1863
- Incarcha Dyar, 1910
- Isolopha Hampson, 1895 (= Islopha Janse, 1931)
- Jocara Walker, 1863 (= Toripalpus Grote, 1878)
- Lacalma Janse, 1931
- Lameerea Ghesquière, 1942
- Lamida Walker, 1859 (= Allata Walker, 1863)
- Lepidogma Meyrick, 1890 (= Asopina Christoph, 1893, Precopia Ragonot, 1891)
- Lepipaschia J. C. Shaffer & Solis, 1994
- Leptoses Ghesquière, 1942
- Lista Walker, 1859 (= Belonepholis Butler, 1889, Craneophora Christoph, 1881, Paracme Lederer, 1863)
- Locastra Walker, 1859 (= Taurica Walker, 1866)
- Macalla Walker, 1859 (= Aradrapha Walker, 1866, Mochlocera Grote, 1876, Pseudomacalla Dognin, 1908)
- Mazdacis Solis, 1993
- Mediavia Solis, 1993
- Micropaschia Hampson, 1906
- Milgithea Schaus, 1922 (= Miligithea Neave, 1940)
- Mimaglossa Warren, 1891
- Neopaschia Janse, 1922
- Noctuides Staudinger, 1892 (= Anartula Staudinger, 1893, Arnatula Hampson, 1896, Parorthaga Hampson, 1896)
- Nouanda Holland & Schaus, 1925
- Nyctereutica Turner, 1904 (= Diastrophica Turner, 1937)
- Obutobea Ghesquière, 1942
- Odontopaschia Hampson, 1903
- Omphalepia Hampson, 1906
- Omphalota Hampson, 1899
- Oneida Hulst, 1889
- Orthaga Walker, 1859 (= Edeta Walker, 1859, Hyperbalanotis Warren, 1891, Pannucha Moore, 1888, Proboscidophora Warren, 1891)
- Oxyalcia Dognin, 1905
- Pandoflabella Solis, 1993
- Parastericta Janse, 1931
- Peplochora Meyrick, 1933
- Phidotricha Ragonot, 1889 (= Eutrichocera Hampson, 1904, Jocarula Dyar, 1925)
- Plumiphora Janse, 1931
- Plutopaschia Hampson, 1917
- Pococera Zeller, 1848 (= Attacapa Hulst, 1889, Auradisa Walker, 1866, Benta Walker, 1863, Hemimatia Lederer, 1863, Katona Hulst, 1888, Lanthaphe Clemens, 1860, Lanthape Hulst, 1903, Loma Hulst, 1888, Saluda Hulst, 1888, Tetralopha Zeller, 1848, Tioga Hulst, 1888, Afra Ghesquière, 1942, Wanda Hulst, 1888)
- Poliopaschia Hampson, 1916
- Polylophota Hampson, 1906
- Pseudocera Walker, 1863
- Quadraforma Solis, 1993
- Rhynchopaschia Hampson, 1906
- Roeseliodes Warren, 1891
- Salma Walker, 1863 (= Calinipaxa Walker, 1866, Enchesphora Turner, 1913, Exacosmia Walker, 1865, Heterobella Turner, 1904, Heterobela Turner, 1904, Orthotrichophora Warren, 1891, Parasarama Warren, 1890, Parasamera Sharp, 1892, Pseudolocastra Snellen, 1890, Pseudolocastra Warren, 1891)
- Schoutedenidea Ghesquière, 1942
- Sparactica Meyrick, 1938
- Spectrotrota Warren, 1891
- Speiroceras Chrétien, 1911
- Stericta Lederer, 1863 (= Glossina Guenée, 1854, Matalia Walker, 1866, Oncobela Turner, 1937, Phialia Walker, 1866)
- Sultania Koçak, 1987
- Taiwanastrapometis Shibuya, 1928
- Tallula Hulst, 1888
- Tancoa Schaus, 1922
- Teliphasa Moore, 1888 (= Sultania Koçak, 1987)
- Termioptycha Meyrick, 1889 (= Sialocyttara Turner, 1913)
- Tineopaschia Hampson, 1916
- Titanoceros Meyrick, 1884
- Trichotophysa Warren, 1896
- Yuma Hulst, 1889
