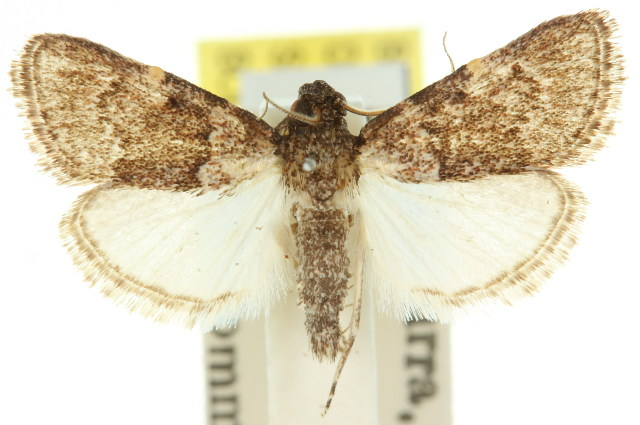
- Araeopaschia normalis

Scientific classification
- Kingdom: Animalia
- Phylum: Arthropoda
- Class: Insecta
- Order: Lepidoptera
- Family: Pyralidae
- Genus: Araeopaschia
- Species: A. normalis

Binomial name
- Araeopaschia normalis (Hampson, 1906)

Synonyms
- Spectrotrota normalis Hampson, 1906

= Araeopaschia normalis =

Species of moth

Araeopaschia normalis is a species of snout moth in the genus Araeopaschia. It was described by George Hampson in 1906 and is known from Australia. They are mainly found in Victoria (State)
