= Araeopaschia =

Scientific classification
- Kingdom: Animalia
- Phylum: Arthropoda
- Class: Insecta
- Order: Lepidoptera
- Family: Pyralidae
- Subfamily: Epipaschiinae
- Genus: Araeopaschia; Hampson, 1906

Synonyms
- Aroeopaschia Amsel, 1956

Genus of moths

Araeopaschia is a genus of snout moths. It was described by George Hampson in 1906.

== Species ==
- Araeopaschia demotis (Meyrick, 1887)
- Araeopaschia normalis (Hampson, 1906)
- Araeopaschia rufescentalis Hampson, 1906
