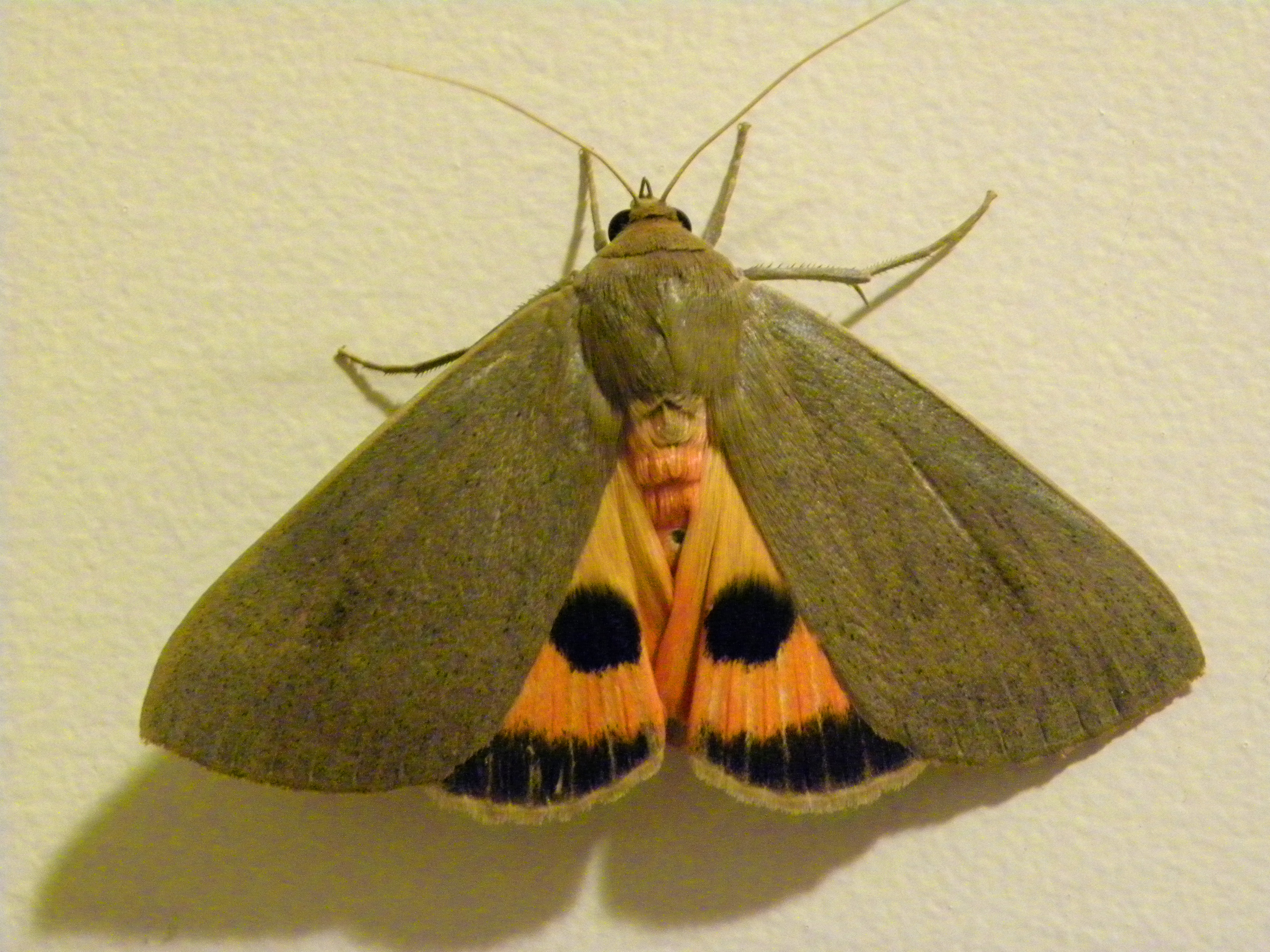
- Cardamyla carinentalis (probably) from central Queensland, Australia

Scientific classification
- Kingdom: Animalia
- Phylum: Arthropoda
- Class: Insecta
- Order: Lepidoptera
- Family: Pyralidae
- Subfamily: Pyralinae
- Tribe: Pyralini; Latreille, 1809

Type species
- Phalaena (Pyralis) farinalis Linnaeus, 1758

Diversity
- About 35–40 genera (but see text)

Synonyms
- Numerous, see text

= Pyralini =

Tribe of moths

The Pyralini are a tribe of snout moths described by Pierre André Latreille in 1809. They belong to the subfamily Pyralinae, which contains the "typical" snout moths of the Old World and some other regions. The genus list presented here is provisional.

They are deemed to represent the lineage around the type species, the meal moth (Pyralis farinalis), a somewhat notorious pest of stored cereals and similar goods. Like this species, Pyralini are usually largish snout moths; some are boldly colored (often in bright brown to yellow hues) by standards of their family.

== Systematics and taxonomy ==
While the Pyralini are a successful radiation even as presently circumscribed, this delimitation is highly provisional. It is very likely that more genera belong here (unknown Pyralinae are still being discovered on a regular basis), and perhaps the group will turn out to be so large or phylogenetically inconsistent that it will be split apart. Pending a detailed analysis, the following genera are placed here (some notable species are also listed):

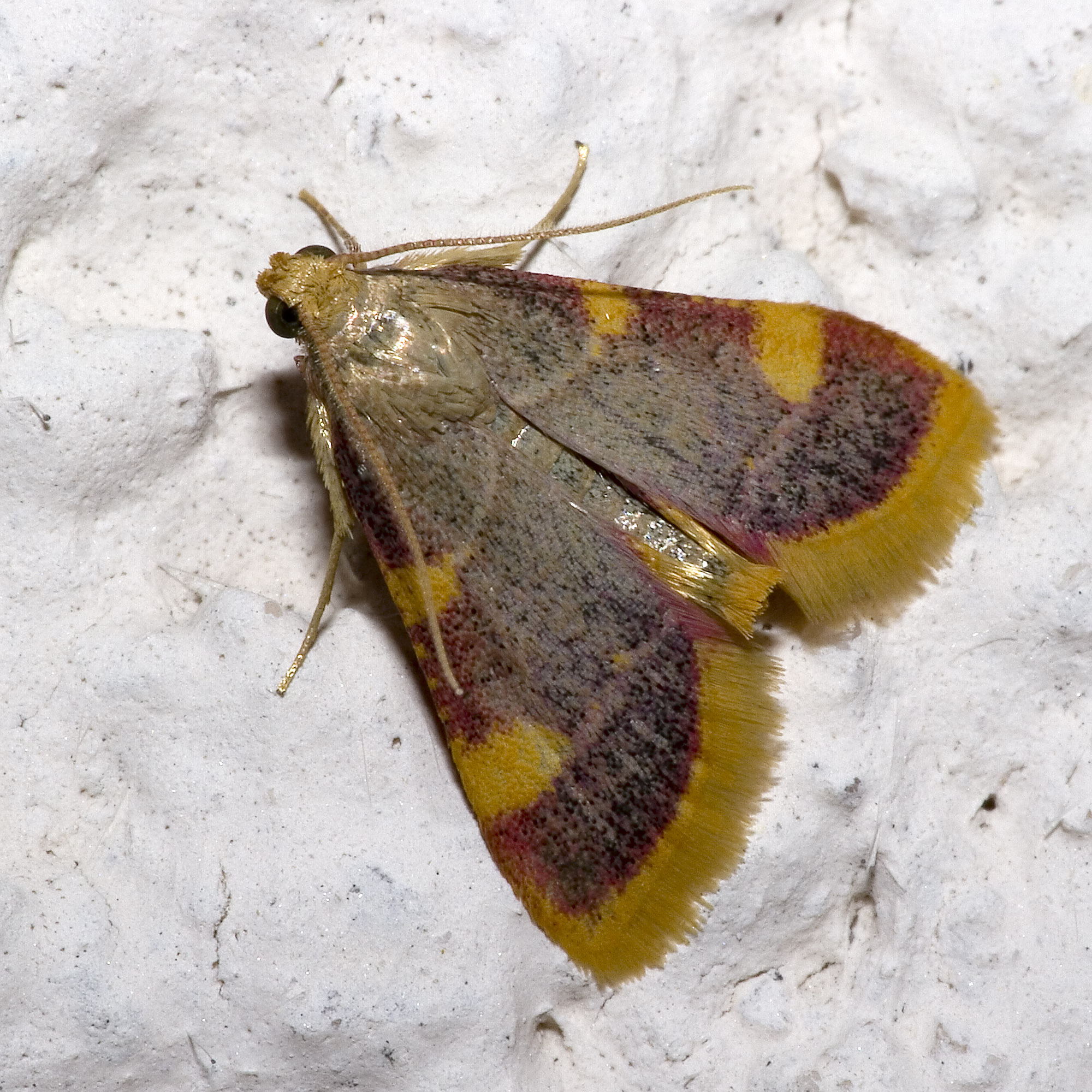
Adult gold triangle (Hypsopygia costalis)

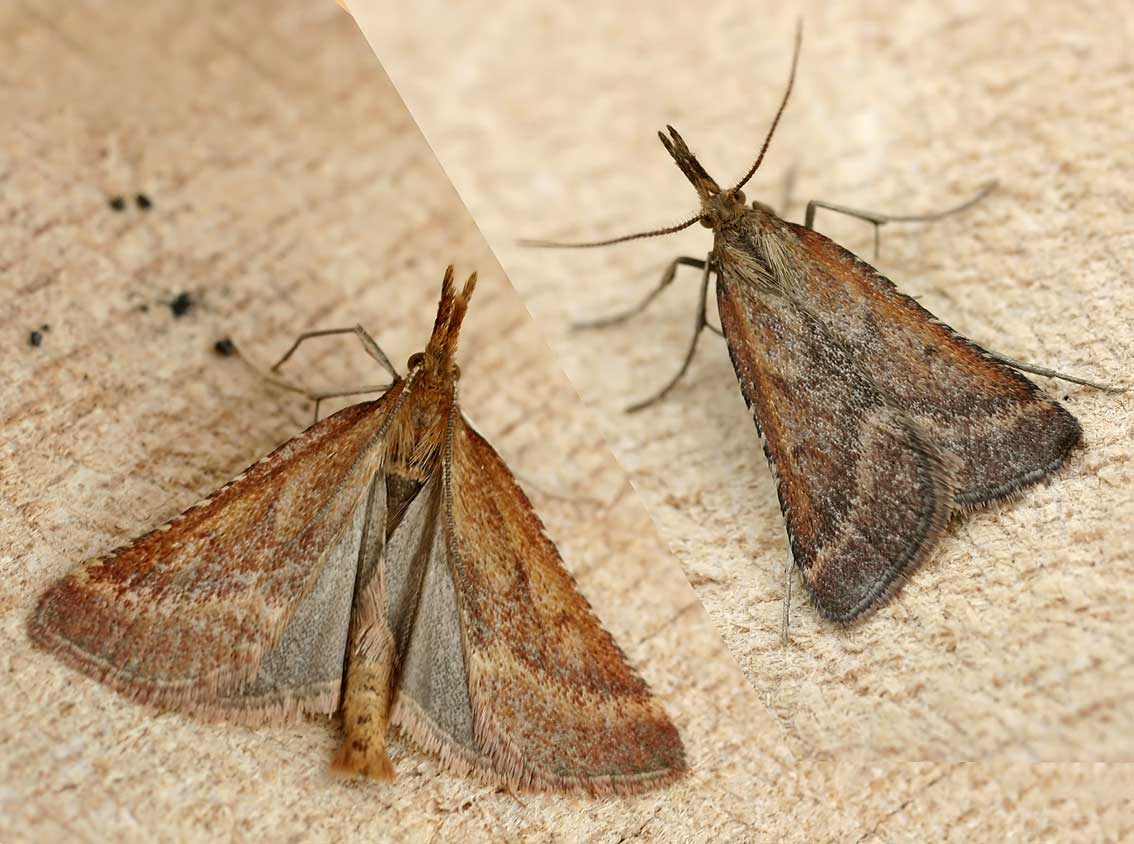
Synaphe punctalis was once proposed as type species of a lineage distinct from the Pyralini, but this remains unverified.

- Actenia Guenée in Boisduval & Guenée, 1854
  - Actenia brunnealis
- Aglossa
- Amphiderita Turner, 1925
- Arescoptera Turner, 1911
- Arippara Walker, [1863]
- Arispe Ragonot, 1891
- Bostra Walker, 1863
- Cardamyla Walker, 1859
- Catocrocis Ragonot, 1891
- Curena Walker, [1866]
- Dolichomia Ragonot, 1891 (mostly placed in Hypsopygia)
- Essina Ragonot, 1891
- Fujimacia Marumo, 1939
- Gauna Walker, [1866]
  - Gauna aegusalis
- Herculia (mostly placed in Hypsopygia)
- Hypsopygia
- Lixa Walker, [1866]
- Macna Walker, [1859]
- Mapeta
- Maradana Moore, 1884
- Micromastra Schaus, 1940
- Neodavisia Barnes & McDunnough, 1914
- Ocrasa (including Orthopygia, mostly placed in Hypsopygia)
- Perisseretma Warren, 1895
- Pseudasopia Grote, 1873 (mostly placed in Hypsopygia)
- Pyralis Linnaeus, 1758
  - Pyralis farinalis – meal moth
  - Pyralis manihotalis
  - Pyralis pictalis – Poplar pyralis, painted meal moth
- Scenedra Meyrick, 1884
  - Scenedra decoratalis
- Scenidiopis Turner, 1904
- Stemmatophora Guenée in Boisduval & Guenée, 1854
- Synaphe Hübner, [1825]
  - Synaphe punctalis
- Taboga Dyar, 1914
- Tanyethira Turner, 1911
- Therapne Ragonot, 1890
- Trebania Ragonot, 1892
  - Trebania flavifrontalis (Leech, 1889)
- Tretopteryx Ragonot, 1890
- Ulotricha Lederer, 1863
- Vitessa Moore, [1860]

Numerous Pyralinae genera have not yet been assigned to a tribe, and in general the subfamily is in need of thorough revision. Some genera have explicitly been allied with Pyralini genera in the past and might more likely than others be members of the present subfamily:

- Loryma Walker, 1859
- Scotomera Butler, 1881
- Tegulifera Saalmüller, 1880
- Zitha Walker, [1866] (including Tamraca)

Tanaobela is a more complicated case; it has by some authors been assigned to the grass moths (Crambidae, formerly included in the Pyralidae). Others have placed it in the Pyralini, which may well be correct.

=== Synonyms ===
The Pyralini have some objective junior synonyms due to misidentifications of specimens by early entomologists. In addition, presumed lineages around Aglossa, Mapeta (= Homalochroa) and Synaphe (= Cledeobia) were once considered taxonomically distinct, often even as subfamilies, but are today included in the present tribe. While they are not likely to be subfamilies, their actual taxonomic status will be determined by future analyses. The presently-obsolete synonyms of Pyralini are:

- Aglossinae A.Blanchard, 1840
- Asopidae Guenée, 1854
- Asopiinae Guenée, 1854
- Cledeobiinae A.Blanchard, 1840
- Homalochroidae Lederer, 1863
- Homalochroinae Lederer, 1863
