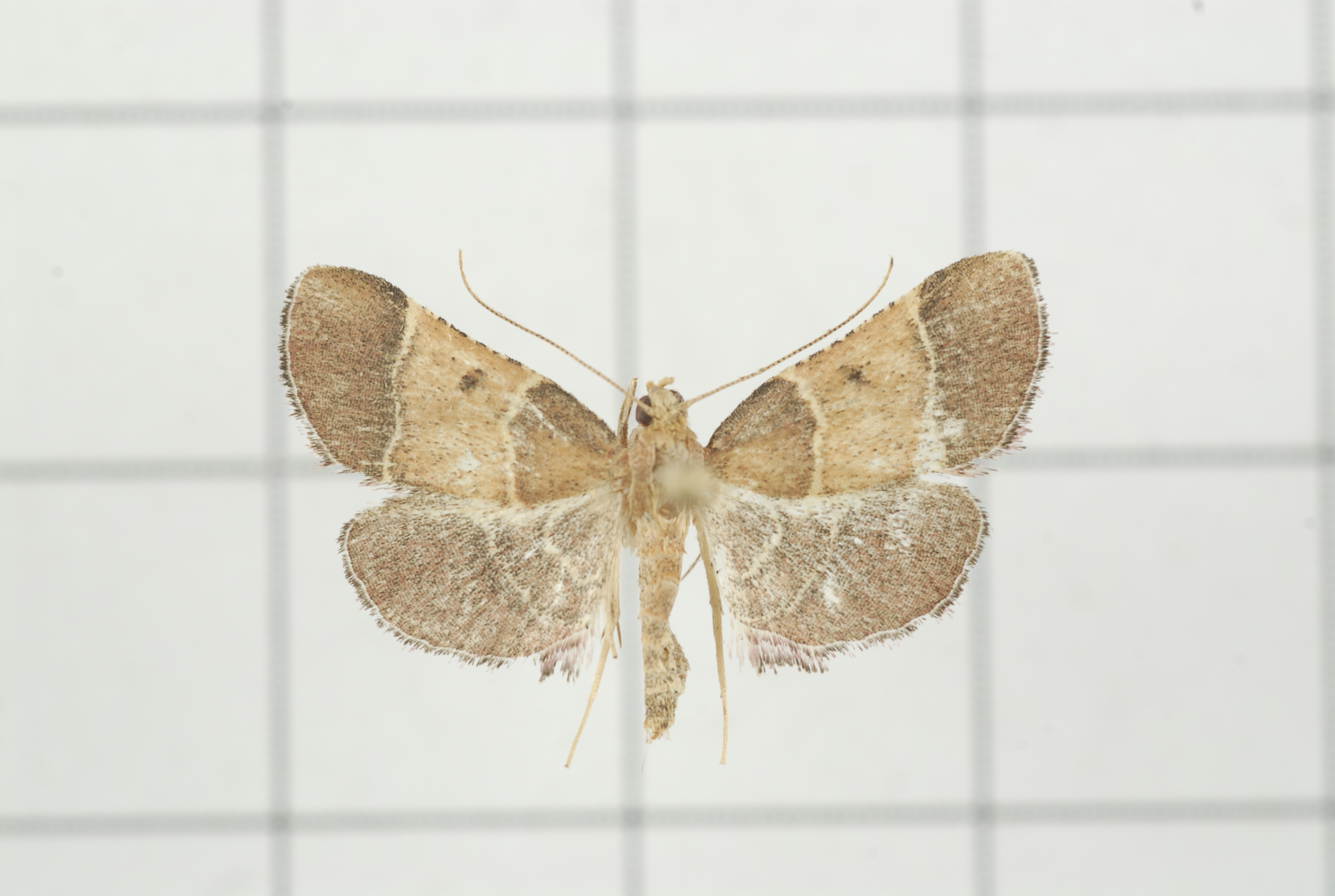

Scientific classification
- Kingdom: Animalia
- Phylum: Arthropoda
- Class: Insecta
- Order: Lepidoptera
- Family: Pyralidae
- Tribe: Pyralini
- Genus: Fujimacia; Marumo, 1939
- Species: F. bicoloralis

Binomial name
- Fujimacia bicoloralis (Leech, 1889)

Synonyms
- Endotricha bicoloralis Leech, 1889; Tegulifera bicoloralis; Stemmatophora bicoloralis; Pyralis dulciculalis Swinhoe, 1889; Tegulifera sinensis Caradja, 1925

= Fujimacia =

Genus of moths

Fujimacia is a genus of snout moths. It originally contained only one species, Fujimacia bicoloralis (Leech, 1889) [=Tegulifera bicoloralis Leech, 1889], which is found in Korea, Japan, China, Taiwan and India.

Qi & Li, 2019 added four further species to the genus (See Pubmed Abstract).

For the type species Fujimacia bicoloralis, its wingspan is 15–18 mm. Adults are on wing from July to August.
