= Gauna serratilis =

Scientific classification
- Kingdom: Animalia
- Phylum: Arthropoda
- Class: Insecta
- Order: Lepidoptera
- Family: Pyralidae
- Genus: Gauna
- Species: G. serratilis

Binomial name
- Gauna serratilis (Snellen, 1890)

Synonyms
- Endotricha serratilis Snellen, 1890

Species of moth

Gauna serratilis is a species of snout moth in the genus Gauna. It was described by Pieter Cornelius Tobias Snellen in 1890, and is known from northern India.
