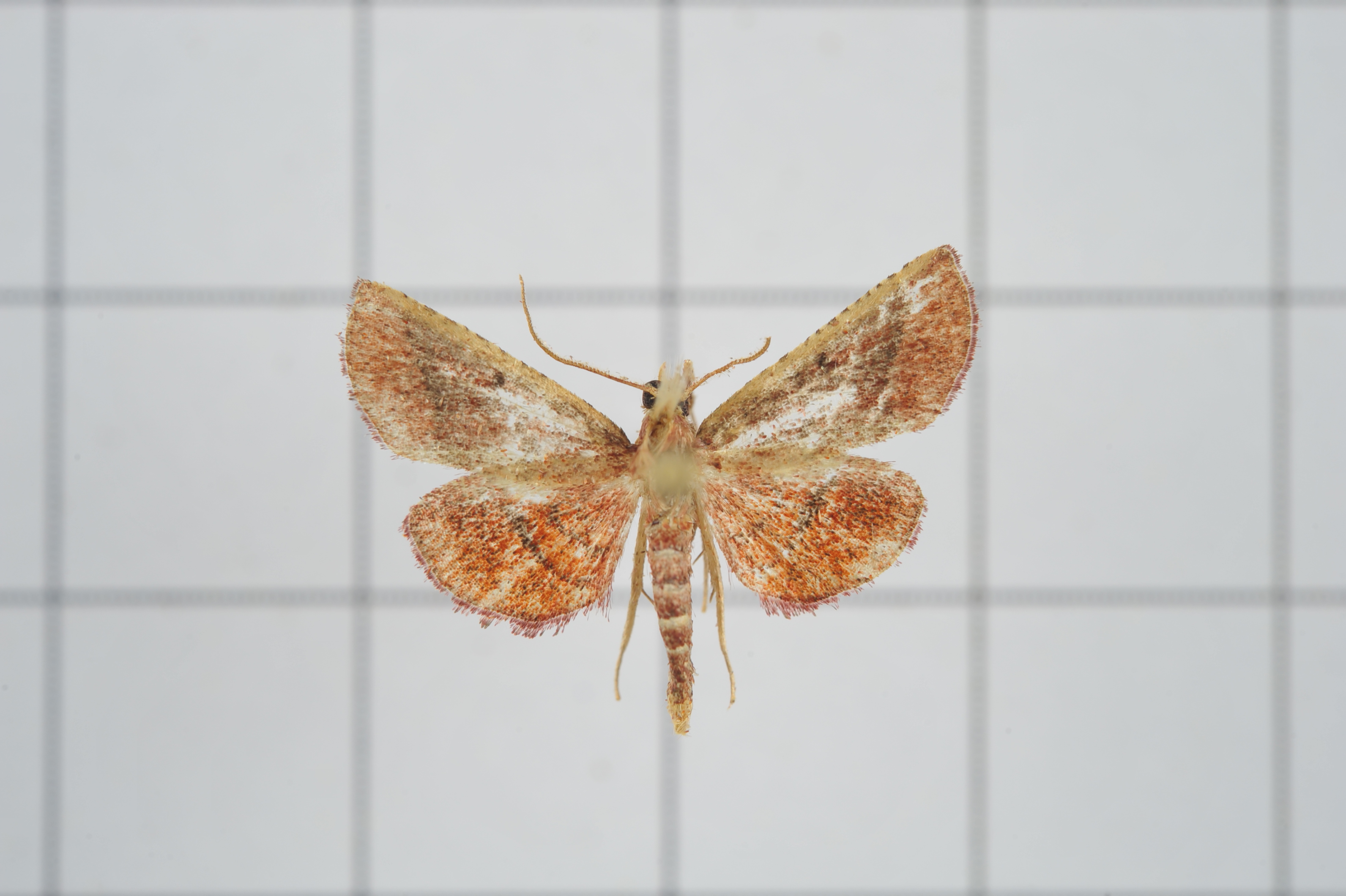

Scientific classification
- Kingdom: Animalia
- Phylum: Arthropoda
- Clade: Pancrustacea
- Class: Insecta
- Order: Lepidoptera
- Family: Pyralidae
- Subfamily: Pyralinae
- Tribe: Pyralini
- Genus: Lixa; Walker, 1866
- Species: L. productalis

Binomial name
- Lixa productalis Walker, 1865

Synonyms
- Hypsopygia productalis; Herculia productalis

= Lixa productalis =

Species of moth

Lixa is a genus of snout moths. It contains only one species, Lixa productalis, which is found on Borneo and Taiwan.

Adult males are reddish-fawn speckled with black. There is a black line which extends from the tip of the forewing to two-thirds of the length of the interior border of the hindwings.

== Subspecies ==
- Lixa productalis productalis (Borneo)
- Lixa productalis taiwana Heppner, 2005 (Taiwan)
