= Stemmatophora gredalis =

Scientific classification
- Domain: Eukaryota
- Kingdom: Animalia
- Phylum: Arthropoda
- Class: Insecta
- Order: Lepidoptera
- Family: Pyralidae
- Genus: Stemmatophora
- Species: S. gredalis

Binomial name
- Stemmatophora gredalis Zerny, 1935

Synonyms
- Actenia gredalis Zerny, 1935

Species of moth

Stemmatophora gredalis is a species of snout moth in the genus Stemmatophora. It was described by Hans Zerny in 1935. It is found in Spain.
