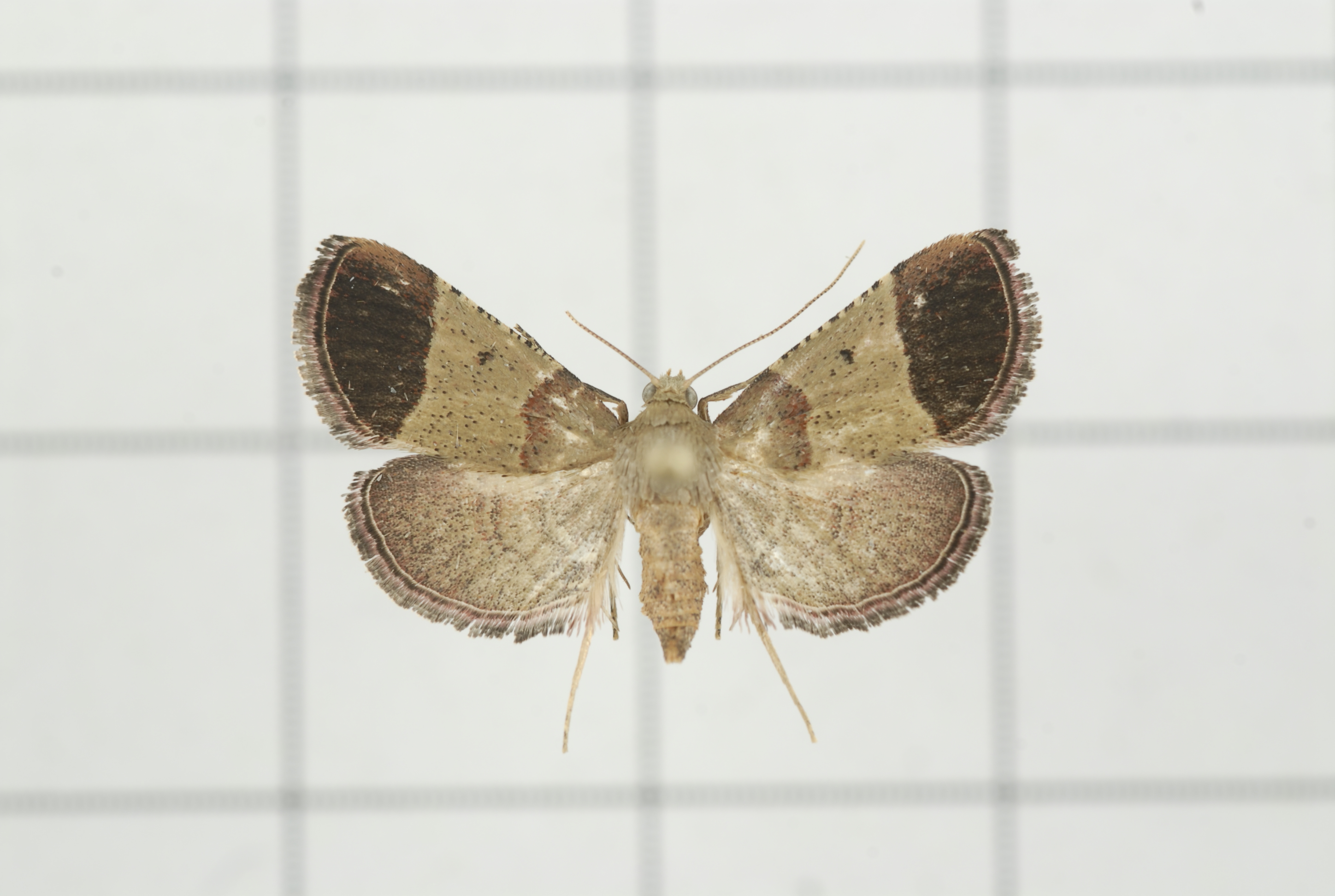

Scientific classification
- Domain: Eukaryota
- Kingdom: Animalia
- Phylum: Arthropoda
- Class: Insecta
- Order: Lepidoptera
- Family: Pyralidae
- Genus: Curena
- Species: C. costipunctata

Binomial name
- Curena costipunctata Shibuya, 1928

= Curena costipunctata =

Species of moth

Curena costipunctata is a species of moth of the family Pyralidae. It is found in Taiwan.
