= Arispe ovalis =

Scientific classification
- Kingdom: Animalia
- Phylum: Arthropoda
- Class: Insecta
- Order: Lepidoptera
- Family: Pyralidae
- Genus: Arispe
- Species: A. ovalis

Binomial name
- Arispe ovalis Ragonot, 1891

Species of moth

Arispe ovalis is a species of snout moth in the genus Arispe. It was described by Ragonot, in 1891. It is found in Mexico.
