= Arippara disticha =

Scientific classification
- Domain: Eukaryota
- Kingdom: Animalia
- Phylum: Arthropoda
- Class: Insecta
- Order: Lepidoptera
- Family: Pyralidae
- Genus: Arippara
- Species: A. disticha

Binomial name
- Arippara disticha (Turner, 1904)

Synonyms
- Bostra disticha Turner, 1904

Species of moth

Arippara disticha is a species of snout moth. It was described by Alfred Jefferis Turner in 1904 and is found in Australia.
