= Mapeta omphephora =

Scientific classification
- Kingdom: Animalia
- Phylum: Arthropoda
- Class: Insecta
- Order: Lepidoptera
- Family: Pyralidae
- Genus: Mapeta
- Species: M. omphephora

Binomial name
- Mapeta omphephora Dyar, 1914

Species of moth

Mapeta omphephora is a species of snout moth in the genus Mapeta. It was described by Harrison Gray Dyar Jr. in 1914 and is known from Mexico.
