= Mapeta =

Scientific classification
- Kingdom: Animalia
- Phylum: Arthropoda
- Clade: Pancrustacea
- Class: Insecta
- Order: Lepidoptera
- Family: Pyralidae
- Tribe: Pyralini
- Genus: Mapeta; Walker, 1863

Type species
- Mapeta xanthomelas Walker, 1863

Synonyms
- Homalochroa Lederer, 1863; Pyralopsis Boisduval, 1870

Genus of moths

Mapeta is a genus of moths belonging to the family Pyralidae.

Species include:

- Mapeta cynosura Druce, 1895
- Mapeta omphephora Dyar, 1914
- Mapeta schausi Druce, 1895
- Mapeta xanthomelas Walker, 1863
