= Stemmatophora byzacaenicalis =

Scientific classification
- Domain: Eukaryota
- Kingdom: Animalia
- Phylum: Arthropoda
- Class: Insecta
- Order: Lepidoptera
- Family: Pyralidae
- Genus: Stemmatophora
- Species: S. byzacaenicalis

Binomial name
- Stemmatophora byzacaenicalis Ragonot, 1887

Synonyms
- Actenia byzacaenicalis Ragonot, 1887; Actenia fulvalis D. Lucas, 1946; Actenia pallidalis Turati, 1924

Species of moth

Stemmatophora byzacaenicalis is a species of snout moth in the genus Stemmatophora. It was described by Émile Louis Ragonot in 1887 and is known from Tunisia. It has also been recorded from Cyprus, but this might be a misidentification.
