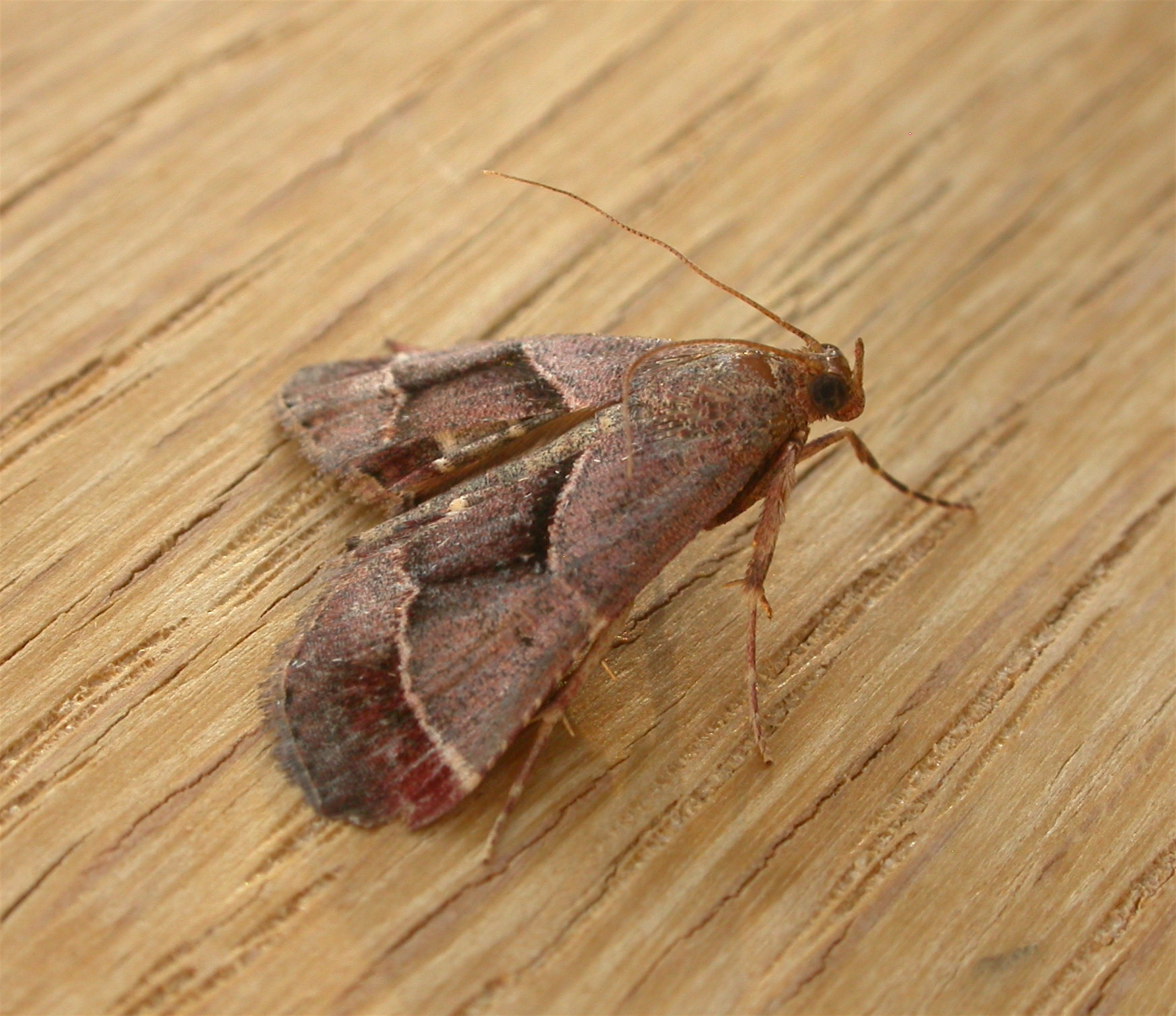
- Gauna aegusalis

Scientific classification
- Domain: Eukaryota
- Kingdom: Animalia
- Phylum: Arthropoda
- Class: Insecta
- Order: Lepidoptera
- Family: Pyralidae
- Tribe: Pyralini
- Genus: Gauna; Walker, [1866]

Type species
- Gauna subferralis Walker, 1866

Synonyms
- Oedematophaga Meyrick, 1884

= Gauna (moth) =

Genus of moths

Gauna is a genus of snout moths described by Francis Walker in 1866.

== Species ==
- Gauna aegusalis Walker, 1859
- Gauna cacaalis Lucas 1891
- Gauna duplicilinea (Hampson, 1893)
- Gauna flavibasalis (Hampson, 1906)
- Gauna mediolineata (Hampson, 1903)
- Gauna phaealis (Hampson, 1906)
- Gauna pyralodes (Hampson, 1916)
- Gauna serratilis (Snellen, 1890)
