= Scotomera caesarealis =

Scientific classification
- Kingdom: Animalia
- Phylum: Arthropoda
- Class: Insecta
- Order: Lepidoptera
- Family: Pyralidae
- Genus: Scotomera
- Species: S. caesarealis

Binomial name
- Scotomera caesarealis (Ragonot, 1891)

Synonyms
- Stemmatophora caesarealis Ragonot, 1891; Actenia beatalis Kalchberg, 1897

Species of moth

Scotomera caesarealis is a species of snout moth. It is found on Cyprus and in Turkey and Syria.
