= Arispe concretalis =

Scientific classification
- Domain: Eukaryota
- Kingdom: Animalia
- Phylum: Arthropoda
- Class: Insecta
- Order: Lepidoptera
- Family: Pyralidae
- Genus: Arispe
- Species: A. concretalis

Binomial name
- Arispe concretalis Ragonot, 1891

Species of moth

Arispe concretalis is a species of snout moth described by Émile Louis Ragonot in 1891. It is found in Mexico.
