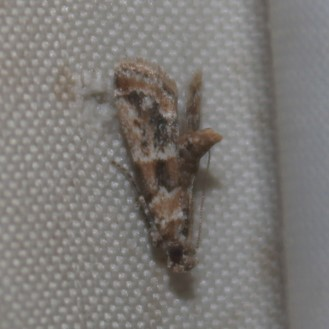

Scientific classification
- Domain: Eukaryota
- Kingdom: Animalia
- Phylum: Arthropoda
- Class: Insecta
- Order: Lepidoptera
- Family: Pyralidae
- Genus: Neodavisia
- Species: N. singularis

Binomial name
- Neodavisia singularis (Barnes & McDunnough, 1913)

Synonyms
- Davisia singularis Barnes & McDunnough, 1913

= Neodavisia singularis =

Species of moth

Neodavisia singularis is a species of snout moth in the family Pyralidae. It was described by William Barnes and James Halliday McDunnough in 1913 and is known from the US state of Florida (where it was described from the Everglades).

The wingspan is about 12 mm.
