= Mapeta schausi =

Scientific classification
- Domain: Eukaryota
- Kingdom: Animalia
- Phylum: Arthropoda
- Class: Insecta
- Order: Lepidoptera
- Family: Pyralidae
- Genus: Mapeta
- Species: M. schausi

Binomial name
- Mapeta schausi H. Druce, 1895

Species of moth

Mapeta schausi is a species of snout moth in the genus Mapeta. It was described by Herbert Druce in 1895, and is known from Chile (including Rinconada) and Mexico (including Vera Cruz, the type location).
