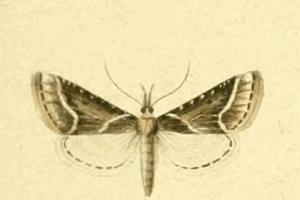

Scientific classification
- Kingdom: Animalia
- Phylum: Arthropoda
- Clade: Pancrustacea
- Class: Insecta
- Order: Lepidoptera
- Family: Pyralidae
- Genus: Stemmatophora
- Species: S. borgialis

Binomial name
- Stemmatophora borgialis (Duponchel, 1832)

Synonyms
- Cledeobia borgialis Duponchel, 1832; Actenia borgialis; Actenia borgialis f. ligerulae Lhomme, 1938

= Stemmatophora borgialis =

Species of moth

Stemmatophora borgialis is a species of snout moth in the genus Stemmatophora. It was described by Philogène Auguste Joseph Duponchel in 1832. It is found in France, Spain, Portugal and Italy.
