= Micromastra =

Scientific classification
- Kingdom: Animalia
- Phylum: Arthropoda
- Clade: Pancrustacea
- Class: Insecta
- Order: Lepidoptera
- Family: Pyralidae
- Subfamily: Pyralinae
- Genus: Micromastra; Schaus, 1940
- Species: M. isoldalis

Binomial name
- Micromastra isoldalis Schaus, 1940

Genus of snout moths

Micromastra is a monotypic genus of snout moths in the subfamily Pyralinae. It was erected by the American entomologist William Schaus in 1940 and contains a single species, Micromastra isoldalis, which is endemic to Puerto Rico. Both the genus and the species were described in the same 1940 work, Schaus's treatment of the Geometridae and Pyralididae for the Scientific Survey of Porto Rico and the Virgin Islands.

== Taxonomy ==
The genus Micromastra and its type species Micromastra isoldalis were described by William Schaus in 1940 in the third part of volume 12 of the Scientific Survey of Porto Rico and the Virgin Islands, published by the New York Academy of Sciences. As the genus was described with a single included species, M. isoldalis is the type species by monotypy.

Micromastra is placed in the subfamily Pyralinae, which is treated by GlobIZ, the Catalogue of Life and other catalogues, and is generally referred to the tribe Pyralini (Latreille, 1809; type genus Pyralis, the meal moth Pyralis farinalis). The Pyralinae are a mainly Old World group of the family Pyralidae; they are rare in the Americas, and the subfamily includes about 900 described species worldwide. No modern phylogenetic revision has re-examined the placement of Micromastra since its original description.

The genus is catalogued in the principal taxonomic databases, including the Global Information System on Pyraloidea (GlobIZ), the Global Biodiversity Information Facility, the Catalogue of Life, and the Global Lepidoptera Names Index (LepIndex).

== Description ==
Detailed morphological information on Micromastra isoldalis is scarce in the readily available literature. The diagnostic characters of the genus and species were given by Schaus in the original 1940 description, but no modern redescription or illustration of the genitalia has been published. As a member of the Pyralinae it is a small snout moth, but published data on its wingspan, colour pattern and life history are lacking.

== Distribution ==
Micromastra isoldalis is known only from Puerto Rico, a territory of the United States. It is included among the Pyralinae in checklists of the moths of Puerto Rico and the wider Antilles.
