= Arippara =

Scientific classification
- Kingdom: Animalia
- Phylum: Arthropoda
- Class: Insecta
- Order: Lepidoptera
- Family: Pyralidae
- Tribe: Pyralini
- Genus: Arippara; Walker, [1863]

Synonyms
- Paleca Butler, 1879; Paredra Snellen, [1880]

Genus of moths

Arippara is a genus of snout moths. It was described by Francis Walker in 1863.

== Species ==
- Arippara disticha (Turner, 1904)
- Arippara eogenalis (Snellen, 1892)
