= Curena externalis =

Scientific classification
- Kingdom: Animalia
- Phylum: Arthropoda
- Class: Insecta
- Order: Lepidoptera
- Family: Pyralidae
- Genus: Curena
- Species: C. externalis

Binomial name
- Curena externalis Walker, [1866]

Synonyms
- Oedematophora cacaalis Lucas, 1891

Species of moth

Curena externalis is a species of snout moth in the genus Curena. It was described by Francis Walker in 1866. It is found in the Australian states of New South Wales and Queensland.

The forewings are pale brown with a dark brown margin. The wings have a recurve in the margin near the tornus.
