= Arispe (moth) =

Scientific classification
- Domain: Eukaryota
- Kingdom: Animalia
- Phylum: Arthropoda
- Class: Insecta
- Order: Lepidoptera
- Family: Pyralidae
- Tribe: Pyralini
- Genus: Arispe; Ragonot, 1891

Synonyms
- Uscodys Dyar, 1908

Genus of moths

Arispe is a genus of snout moths described by Émile Louis Ragonot in 1891.

== Species ==
- Arispe cestalis (Hulst, 1886)
- Arispe concretalis Ragonot, 1891
- Arispe ovalis Ragonot, 1891
