= Stemmatophora syriacalis =

Scientific classification
- Domain: Eukaryota
- Kingdom: Animalia
- Phylum: Arthropoda
- Class: Insecta
- Order: Lepidoptera
- Family: Pyralidae
- Genus: Stemmatophora
- Species: S. syriacalis

Binomial name
- Stemmatophora syriacalis (Ragonot, 1895)

Synonyms
- Scotomerodes syriacalis Ragonot, 1895; Stemmatophora oranalis Zerny, 1914; Aglossa oranalis; Aglossa fuliginosalis; Stemmatophora fuliginosalis Zerny, 1927

Species of moth

Stemmatophora syriacalis is a species of snout moth in the genus Stemmatophora. It was described by Émile Louis Ragonot in 1895. It is found in France, Spain and Algeria.

== Species ==
- Stemmatophora syriacalis syriacalis
- Stemmatophora syriacalis oranalis Zerny, 1914 (Algeria, France and Spain)
