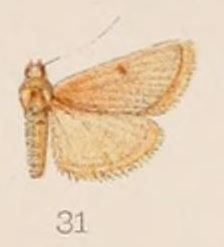

Scientific classification
- Kingdom: Animalia
- Phylum: Arthropoda
- Class: Insecta
- Order: Lepidoptera
- Family: Pyralidae
- Genus: Maradana
- Species: M. desertalis

Binomial name
- Maradana desertalis (Hampson, 1908)

Synonyms
- Paractenia desertalis Hampson, 1908

= Maradana desertalis =

Species of moth

Maradana desertalis is a moth of the family Pyralidae described by George Hampson in 1908. It is found in Balochistan.
