= Mapeta cynosura =

Scientific classification
- Domain: Eukaryota
- Kingdom: Animalia
- Phylum: Arthropoda
- Class: Insecta
- Order: Lepidoptera
- Family: Pyralidae
- Genus: Mapeta
- Species: M. cynosura

Binomial name
- Mapeta cynosura H. Druce, 1895

Species of moth

Mapeta cynosura is a species of snout moth in the genus Mapeta. It was described by Herbert Druce in 1895, and is known from Mexico (including Cuernavaca, Morelos, the type location).
