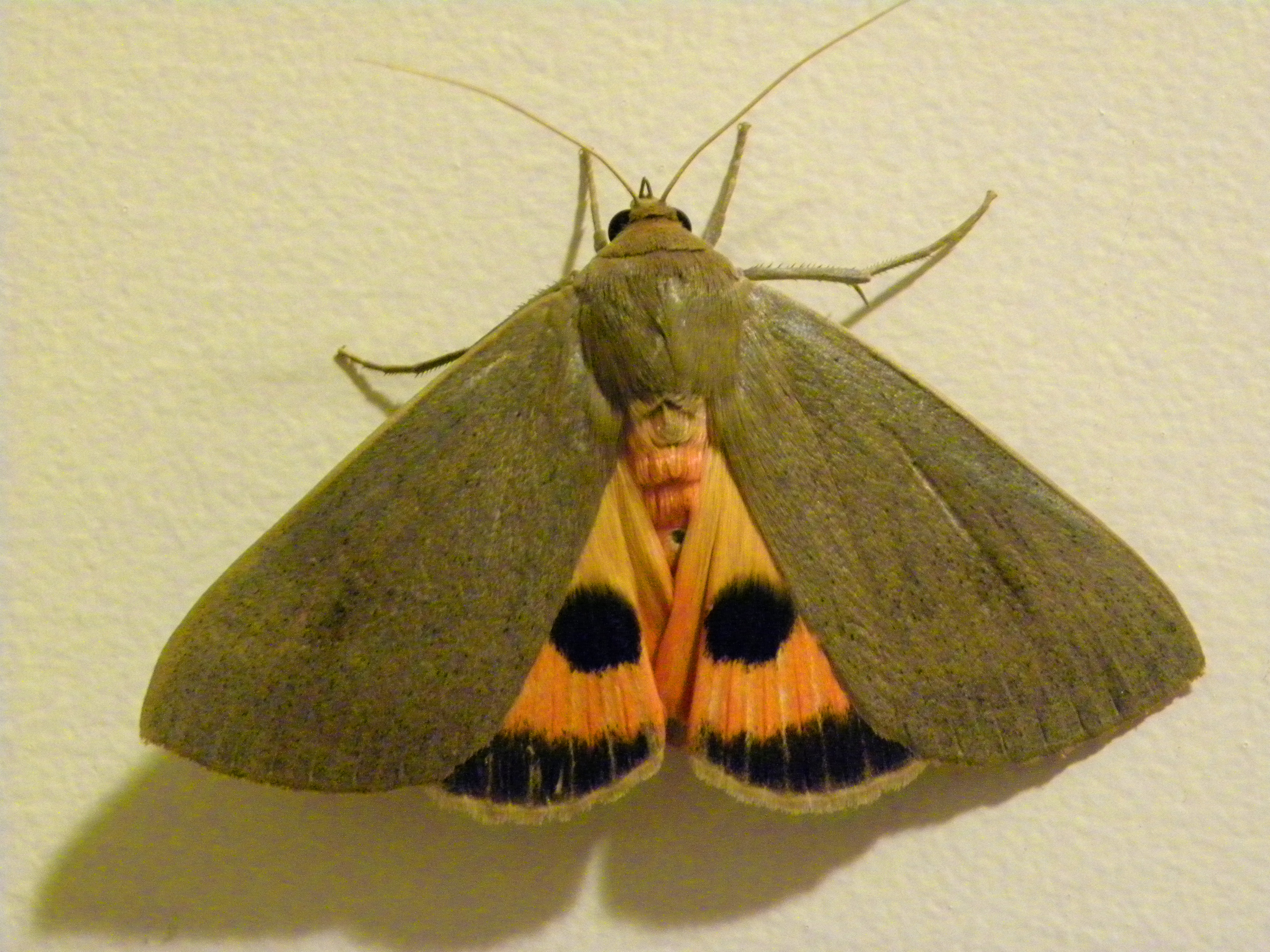
- Cardamyla carinentalis

Scientific classification
- Kingdom: Animalia
- Phylum: Arthropoda
- Class: Insecta
- Order: Lepidoptera
- Family: Pyralidae
- Tribe: Pyralini
- Genus: Cardamyla; Walker, 1859

Synonyms
- Balanotis Meyrick, 1884

= Cardamyla =

Genus of moths

Cardamyla is a genus of snout moths. It was described by Francis Walker in 1859 and is known from Australia.

== Species ==
- Cardamyla carinentalis Walker, 1859
- Cardamyla didymalis Walker, 1859
- Cardamyla eurycroca Turner, 1937
- Cardamyla hercophora (Meyrick, 1884)
