= Tanyethira =

Scientific classification
- Kingdom: Animalia
- Phylum: Arthropoda
- Clade: Pancrustacea
- Class: Insecta
- Order: Lepidoptera
- Family: Pyralidae
- Subfamily: Pyralinae
- Tribe: Pyralini
- Genus: Tanyethira; Turner, 1911
- Species: T. duplicilinea

Binomial name
- Tanyethira duplicilinea (Hampson, 1893)

Synonyms
- Endotricha duplicilinea Hampson, 1893; Gauna duplicilinea (Hampson, 1893)

Species of moth

Tanyethira duplicilinea is a moth of the family Pyralidae first described by George Hampson in 1893. It is the only species in the genus Tanyethira. It is found in Sri Lanka.

The caterpillar is known to feed on Mangifera indica.
