= Tretopteryx =

Scientific classification
- Domain: Eukaryota
- Kingdom: Animalia
- Phylum: Arthropoda
- Class: Insecta
- Order: Lepidoptera
- Family: Pyralidae
- Tribe: Pyralini
- Genus: Tretopteryx; Ragonot, 1890
- Species: T. pertusalis

Binomial name
- Tretopteryx pertusalis (Geyer in Hübner, 1832)

Synonyms
- Eurrhypis pertusalis Geyer in Hübner, 1832

Genus of moths

Tretopteryx is a genus of snout moths. It was described by Ragonot in 1890. It contains only one species, Tretopteryx pertusalis, which is found in France, on Crete and in Turkey and Syria.

The wingspan is about 27 mm.
