= Maradana fuscolimbalis =

Scientific classification
- Domain: Eukaryota
- Kingdom: Animalia
- Phylum: Arthropoda
- Class: Insecta
- Order: Lepidoptera
- Family: Pyralidae
- Genus: Maradana
- Species: M. fuscolimbalis

Binomial name
- Maradana fuscolimbalis (Ragonot, 1888)

Synonyms
- Stemmatophora fuscolimbalis Ragonot, 1888; Zitha fuscolimbalis; Therapne fuscolimbalis

Species of moth

Maradana fuscolimbalis is a species of snout moth. It is found on Sardinia and Malta and in Tunisia.

The wingspan is about 19 mm.
