= Stemmatophora combustalis =

Scientific classification
- Kingdom: Animalia
- Phylum: Arthropoda
- Clade: Pancrustacea
- Class: Insecta
- Order: Lepidoptera
- Family: Pyralidae
- Genus: Stemmatophora
- Species: S. combustalis

Binomial name
- Stemmatophora combustalis (Fischer v. Röslerstamm, 1842)

Synonyms
- Asopia combustalis Fischer v. Röslerstamm, 1842

Species of insect

Stemmatophora combustalis is a species of snout moth. It is found in France, Spain, Portugal, Italy, Croatia, Romania, Bulgaria, North Macedonia, Albania and Greece.

The wingspan is about 18 mm.
