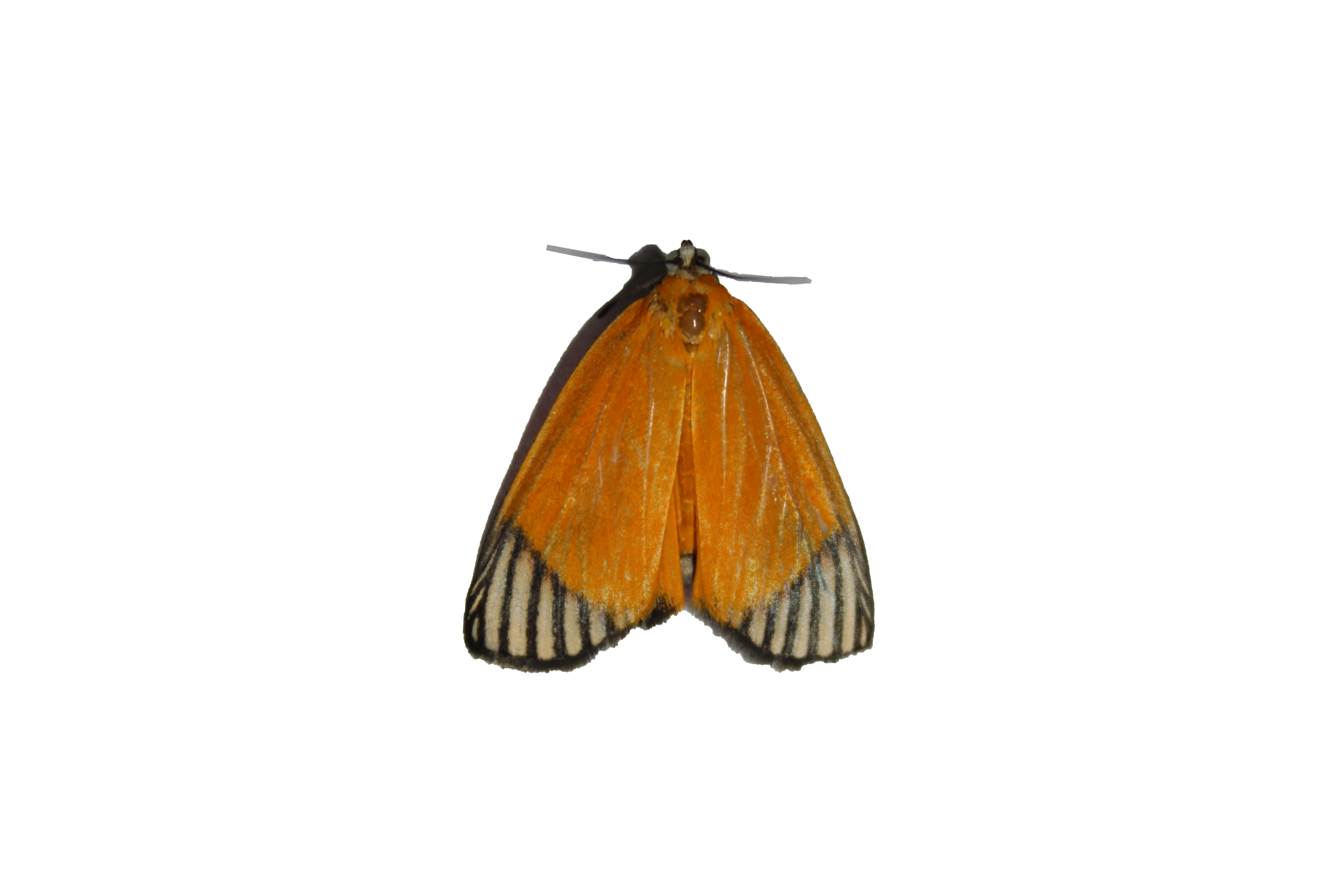

Scientific classification
- Kingdom: Animalia
- Phylum: Arthropoda
- Class: Insecta
- Order: Lepidoptera
- Family: Pyralidae
- Genus: Mapeta
- Species: M. xanthomelas

Binomial name
- Mapeta xanthomelas Walker, 1863

Synonyms
- Homalochroa aestivalis Lederer, 1863; Pyralopsis divisa Boisduval, 1870

= Mapeta xanthomelas =

Species of moth

Mapeta xanthomelas is a species of snout moth and the type species in the genus Mapeta. It was described by Francis Walker in 1863 and is known from Jamaica and Mexico to Venezuela.
