= Gauna mediolineata =

Scientific classification
- Kingdom: Animalia
- Phylum: Arthropoda
- Class: Insecta
- Order: Lepidoptera
- Family: Pyralidae
- Genus: Gauna
- Species: G. mediolineata

Binomial name
- Gauna mediolineata (Hampson, 1903)

Synonyms
- Endotricha mediolineata Hampson, 1903; Endotricha mediolineata Hampson, 1906

Species of moth

Gauna mediolineata is a species of snout moth in the genus Gauna. It was described by George Hampson in 1903 and is known from northern India.
