= Gauna pyralodes =

Scientific classification
- Kingdom: Animalia
- Phylum: Arthropoda
- Class: Insecta
- Order: Lepidoptera
- Family: Pyralidae
- Genus: Gauna
- Species: G. pyralodes

Binomial name
- Gauna pyralodes (Hampson, 1916)

Synonyms
- Endotricha pyralodes Hampson, 1916

Species of moth

Gauna pyralodes is a species of snout moth in the genus Gauna. It was described by George Hampson in 1916 and is known from western Africa.

Little is known about this moth. It is small and cryptic, with the characteristic snout of the family Pyralidae. Its habitat, lifestyle and ecology have not been studied.
