= Stemmatophora rungsi =

Scientific classification
- Domain: Eukaryota
- Kingdom: Animalia
- Phylum: Arthropoda
- Class: Insecta
- Order: Lepidoptera
- Family: Pyralidae
- Genus: Stemmatophora
- Species: S. rungsi

Binomial name
- Stemmatophora rungsi (Leraut, 2000)

Synonyms
- Actenia rungsi Leraut, 2000

Species of moth

Stemmatophora rungsi is a species of snout moth. It is found in Portugal.

The wingspan is about 21 mm.
