= Stemmatophora albifimbrialis =

Scientific classification
- Kingdom: Animalia
- Phylum: Arthropoda
- Class: Insecta
- Order: Lepidoptera
- Family: Pyralidae
- Genus: Stemmatophora
- Species: S. albifimbrialis

Binomial name
- Stemmatophora albifimbrialis (Hampson, 1906)

Synonyms
- Herculia albifimbrialis Hampson, 1906; Stemmatophora tsushimensis Inoue, 1982

Species of moth

Stemmatophora albifimbrialis is a species of snout moth. It is found in Korea, Japan, China and Taiwan.

The ground colour of the forewings is yellowish brown. Adults are on wing from April to August.
