= Curena =

Scientific classification
- Kingdom: Animalia
- Phylum: Arthropoda
- Class: Insecta
- Order: Lepidoptera
- Family: Pyralidae
- Tribe: Pyralini
- Genus: Curena; Walker, 1866

Genus of moths

Curena is a genus of snout moths. It was described by Francis Walker in 1866.

== Species ==
- Curena caustopa
- Curena costipunctata Shibuya, 1928
- Curena externalis Walker, [1866] 1865
