= Stemmatophora gadesialis =

Scientific classification
- Domain: Eukaryota
- Kingdom: Animalia
- Phylum: Arthropoda
- Class: Insecta
- Order: Lepidoptera
- Family: Pyralidae
- Genus: Stemmatophora
- Species: S. gadesialis

Binomial name
- Stemmatophora gadesialis Ragonot, 1882

Synonyms
- Actenia gadesialis

Species of moth

Stemmatophora gadesialis is a species of snout moth in the genus Stemmatophora. It was described by Émile Louis Ragonot in 1882 and is known from Spain and Algeria.

The wingspan is about 18 mm.
