= Cardamyla eurycroca =

Scientific classification
- Domain: Eukaryota
- Kingdom: Animalia
- Phylum: Arthropoda
- Class: Insecta
- Order: Lepidoptera
- Family: Pyralidae
- Genus: Cardamyla
- Species: C. eurycroca

Binomial name
- Cardamyla eurycroca Turner, 1937

Species of moth

Cardamyla eurycroca is a species of snout moth in the genus Cardamyla. It was described by Alfred Jefferis Turner in 1937. It is found in Australia.
