= Stemmatophora honestalis =

Scientific classification
- Domain: Eukaryota
- Kingdom: Animalia
- Phylum: Arthropoda
- Class: Insecta
- Order: Lepidoptera
- Family: Pyralidae
- Genus: Stemmatophora
- Species: S. honestalis

Binomial name
- Stemmatophora honestalis (Treitschke, 1829)

Synonyms
- Pyralis honestalis Treitschke, 1829; Actenia honestalis; Actenia honestalis marrakechensis Leraut, 2000

Species of moth

Stemmatophora honestalis is a species of snout moth in the genus Stemmatophora. It was described by Georg Friedrich Treitschke in 1829. It is found in Spain and on the Balkan Peninsula and North Africa.
