= Scenedra umbrosalis =

Scientific classification
- Domain: Eukaryota
- Kingdom: Animalia
- Phylum: Arthropoda
- Class: Insecta
- Order: Lepidoptera
- Family: Pyralidae
- Genus: Scenedra
- Species: S. umbrosalis

Binomial name
- Scenedra umbrosalis (Wileman, 1911)

Synonyms
- Herculia umbrosalis Wileman, 1911; Hypsopygia umbrosalis

Species of moth

Scenedra umbrosalis is a species of snout moth in the genus Scenedra. It was described by Wileman in 1911. It is found in Japan, the Russian Far East.

The wingspan is 15–22 mm.
