= Gauna flavibasalis =

Scientific classification
- Kingdom: Animalia
- Phylum: Arthropoda
- Class: Insecta
- Order: Lepidoptera
- Family: Pyralidae
- Genus: Gauna
- Species: G. flavibasalis

Binomial name
- Gauna flavibasalis (Hampson, 1906)

Synonyms
- Scenedra flavibasalis Hampson, 1906; Tanyethira hemicneca Turner, 1911

Species of moth

Gauna flavibasalis is a species of snout moth in the genus Gauna. It is known from Australia.
