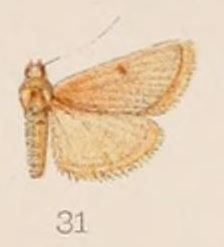
- Maradana desertalis

Scientific classification
- Domain: Eukaryota
- Kingdom: Animalia
- Phylum: Arthropoda
- Class: Insecta
- Order: Lepidoptera
- Family: Pyralidae
- Tribe: Pyralini
- Genus: Maradana; Moore, 1884

Synonyms
- Paractenia Ragonot, 1892; Pyralestes Turati, 1922

= Maradana (moth) =

Genus of moths

Maradana is a genus of snout moths. It was described by Frederic Moore in 1884.

== Species ==
- Maradana adelinae Leraut, 2009
- Maradana africalis Leraut, 2007
- Maradana alcardi Leraut, 2007
- Maradana bernardii Leraut, 2007
- Maradana boudinoti Leraut, 2007
- Maradana centrafricalis Leraut, 2007
- Maradana dargei Leraut, 2007
- Maradana desertalis Hampson, 1908
- Maradana fuscolimbalis (Ragonot, 1887)
- Maradana harpyialis (Walker, 1859)
- Maradana himoensis Leraut, 2007
- Maradana joannisalis Leraut, 2011
- Maradana lamottealis Leraut, 2011
- Maradana maesi Leraut, 2007
- Maradana metayei Leraut, 2007
- Maradana minimalis (Amsel, 1949)
- Maradana nimbaensis Leraut, 2007
- Maradana oubanguialis Leraut, 2011
- Maradana pallidalis Leraut, 2011
- Maradana pictalis Leraut, 2011
- Maradana recisalis (Swinhoe, 1885)
- Maradana rivulata Moore, 1884
- Maradana rubicundalis (Swinhoe, 1886)
- Maradana vidualis (Chrétien, 1911)
- Maradana vinacealis Leraut, 2007
