= Scotomera =

Scientific classification
- Kingdom: Animalia
- Phylum: Arthropoda
- Class: Insecta
- Order: Lepidoptera
- Family: Pyralidae
- Tribe: Pyralini
- Genus: Scotomera; Butler, 1881

Genus of moths

Scotomera is a genus of snout moths. It was described by Arthur Gardiner Butler in 1881.

== Species ==
- Scotomera atomalis Amsel, 1949
- Scotomera caesarealis (Ragonot, 1891)
- Scotomera comealis Amsel, 1950
- Scotomera fuliginosalis Leraut, 2007
- Scotomera gnidusalis (Walker, 1859)
- Scotomera kirmanialis Amsel, 1961
- Scotomera laristanalis (Amsel, 1961)
- Scotomera luteocostalis Amsel, 1950
- Scotomera shirazalis (Amsel, 1961)
- Scotomera tacapealis (Ragonot, 1891)
