= Stemmatophora robustus =

Scientific classification
- Domain: Eukaryota
- Kingdom: Animalia
- Phylum: Arthropoda
- Class: Insecta
- Order: Lepidoptera
- Family: Pyralidae
- Genus: Stemmatophora
- Species: S. robustus

Binomial name
- Stemmatophora robustus (Asselbergs, 2010)

Synonyms
- Acteniopsis robustus Asselbergs, 2010

Species of moth

Stemmatophora robustus is a species of snout moth in the genus Stemmatophora. It was described by Jan Asselbergs in 2010 as Acteniopsis robustus and is known from the United Arab Emirates.
