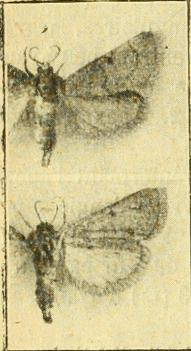

Scientific classification
- Domain: Eukaryota
- Kingdom: Animalia
- Phylum: Arthropoda
- Class: Insecta
- Order: Lepidoptera
- Family: Pyralidae
- Genus: Maradana
- Species: M. vidualis

Binomial name
- Maradana vidualis (Chrétien, 1911)

Synonyms
- Actenia vidualis Chrétien, 1911; Zitha vidualis; Paractenia chneouri D. Lucas, 1938; Paractenia rosinans D. Lucas, 1951; Pyralis mariaeludovicae D. Lucas, 1950; Pyralestes ragusai Turati, 1922

= Maradana vidualis =

Species of moth

Maradana vidualis is a species of snout moth. It is found on Malta and Sicily and in Tunisia.

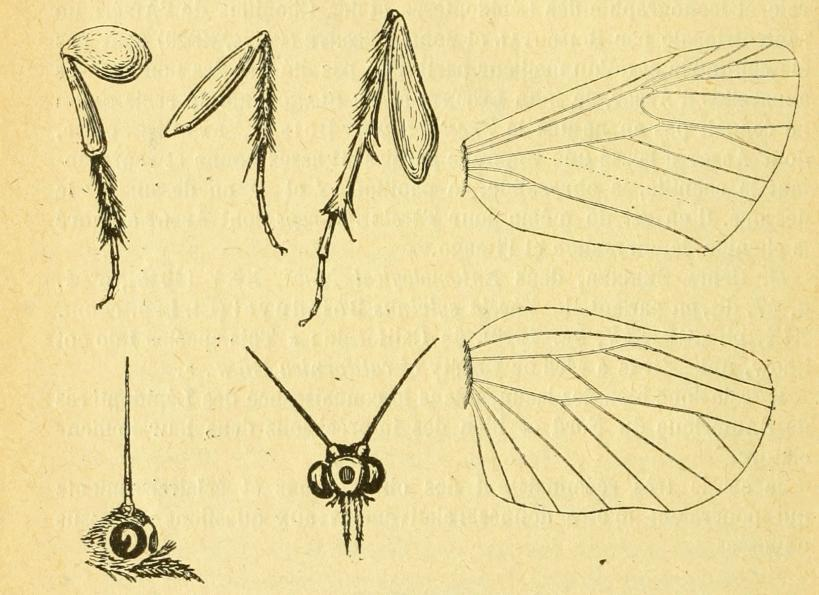
Illustrations accompanying the original description of Pyralestes ragusai, now a synonym of Maradana vidualis

The wingspan is 23–25 mm for females and 27–29 mm for males. Both sexes may be found in three different forms: a reddish/brown, light greyish-green and dark greyish-green form. This last colour form is the rarest and the reddish/brown form is the commonest. Adults are on wing from July to October in probably one generation per year.
