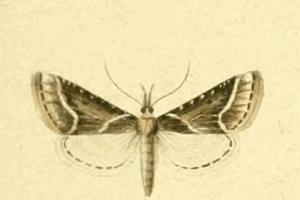
- Stemmatophora borgialis

Scientific classification
- Domain: Eukaryota
- Kingdom: Animalia
- Phylum: Arthropoda
- Class: Insecta
- Order: Lepidoptera
- Family: Pyralidae
- Tribe: Pyralini
- Genus: Stemmatophora; Guenée in Boisduval & Guenée, 1854

Synonyms
- Actenia Guenée, 1854; Actaenia Ragonot, 1887; Elicia Ragonot, 1892; Libora Ragonot, 1891; Scotomerodes Ragonot, 1895; Stygiochroa Ragonot, 1895

= Stemmatophora =

Genus of moths

Stemmatophora is a genus of snout moths described by Achille Guenée in 1854.

== Species ==
- Stemmatophora albifimbrialis (Hampson, 1906)
- Stemmatophora austautalis (Oberthür, 1881)
- Stemmatophora bicincta de Joannis, 1927
- Stemmatophora borgialis (Duponchel, 1832)
- Stemmatophora brunnealis (Treitschke, 1829)
- Stemmatophora byzacaenicalis Ragonot, 1887
- Stemmatophora combustalis (Fischer von Röslerstamm, [1842])
- Stemmatophora gadesialis (Ragonot, 1882)
- Stemmatophora gredalis Zerny, 1935
- Stemmatophora honestalis (Treitschke, 1829)
- Stemmatophora incalidalis (Hübner, 1825)
- Stemmatophora malgassalis (Saalmüller, 1880)
- Stemmatophora matilei (Leraut, 2000)
- Stemmatophora orbicentralis (Rebel, 1902)
- Stemmatophora perrubralis (Hampson, 1917)
- Stemmatophora persica Amsel, 1949
- Stemmatophora robustus (Asselbergs, 2010)
- Stemmatophora rungsi (Leraut, 2000)
- Stemmatophora serratalis (Hampson, 1900)
- Stemmatophora syriacalis (Ragonot, 1895)
- Stemmatophora valida (Butler, 1879)
- Stemmatophora vulpecalis Ragonot, 1891
