= Curena caustopa =

Scientific classification
- Domain: Eukaryota
- Kingdom: Animalia
- Phylum: Arthropoda
- Class: Insecta
- Order: Lepidoptera
- Family: Pyralidae
- Genus: Curena
- Species: C. caustopa

Binomial name
- Curena caustopa (Turner, 1905)

Synonyms
- Endotricha caustopa Turner, 1905; Curena indistinctalis Rothschild, 1916

Species of moth

Curena caustopa is a species of snout moth in the genus Curena described by Alfred Jefferis Turner in 1905. It is found in Queensland, Australia.

The wingspan is about 10 mm.
