= Stemmatophora valida =

Scientific classification
- Kingdom: Animalia
- Phylum: Arthropoda
- Clade: Pancrustacea
- Class: Insecta
- Order: Lepidoptera
- Family: Pyralidae
- Genus: Stemmatophora
- Species: S. valida

Binomial name
- Stemmatophora valida (Butler, 1879)

Synonyms
- Pyralis valida Butler, 1879

Species of moth

Stemmatophora valida is a species of snout moth. It is found in Korea, Japan, China and the north-western Himalaya.

Its wingspan is 17–23 mm. The ground colour of its forewings is pale grayish brown. Adults are on wing from June to August.
