= Stemmatophora perrubralis =

Scientific classification
- Kingdom: Animalia
- Phylum: Arthropoda
- Class: Insecta
- Order: Lepidoptera
- Family: Pyralidae
- Genus: Stemmatophora
- Species: S. perrubralis

Binomial name
- Stemmatophora perrubralis (Hampson, 1917)

Synonyms
- Herculia perrubralis Hampson, 1917; Hypsopygia perrubralis

Species of moth

Stemmatophora perrubralis is a species of snout moth in the genus Stemmatophora. It was described by George Hampson in 1917. It is found in Nigeria and South Africa.
