= Gauna phaealis =

Scientific classification
- Kingdom: Animalia
- Phylum: Arthropoda
- Class: Insecta
- Order: Lepidoptera
- Family: Pyralidae
- Genus: Gauna
- Species: G. phaealis

Binomial name
- Gauna phaealis (Hampson, 1906)

Synonyms
- Endotricha phaealis Hampson, 1906; Scenidiopis heterozyga Turner, 1937

Species of moth

Gauna phaealis is a species of snout moth in the genus Gauna. It was described by George Hampson in 1906, and is known from New Guinea and Australia.
