= Catocrocis =

Scientific classification
- Kingdom: Animalia
- Phylum: Arthropoda
- Class: Insecta
- Order: Lepidoptera
- Family: Pyralidae
- Tribe: Pyralini
- Genus: Catocrocis; Ragonot, 1891
- Species: C. lithosialis

Binomial name
- Catocrocis lithosialis Ragonot, 1891

Genus of moths

Catocrocis is a monotypic snout moth genus described by Émile Louis Ragonot in 1891. Its only species, Catocrocis lithosialis, was described in the same article. It is found in Brazil.
