= Arippara eogenalis =

Scientific classification
- Kingdom: Animalia
- Phylum: Arthropoda
- Class: Insecta
- Order: Lepidoptera
- Family: Pyralidae
- Genus: Arippara
- Species: A. eogenalis

Binomial name
- Arippara eogenalis (Snellen, 1880)

Synonyms
- Paredra eogenalis Snellen, [1880]

Species of moth

Arippara eogenalis is a species of snout moth. It was described by Pieter Cornelius Tobias Snellen in 1880 and is found in Indonesia (including Sumatra).
