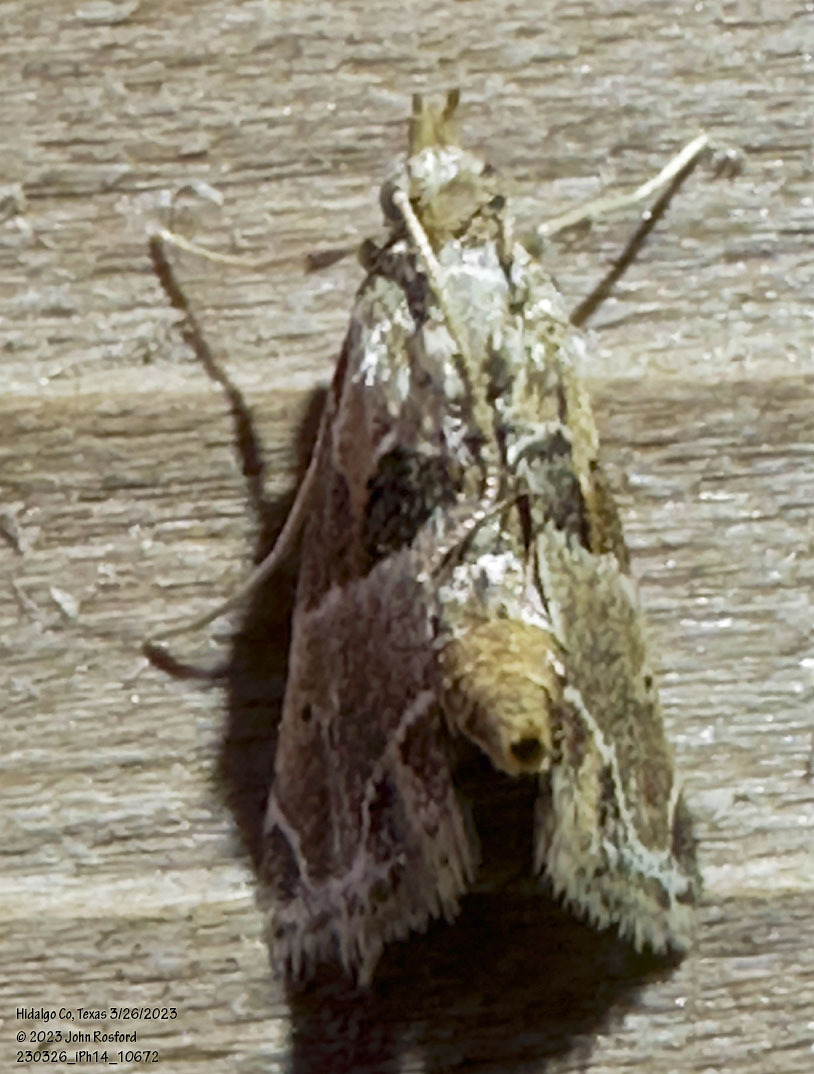

Scientific classification
- Domain: Eukaryota
- Kingdom: Animalia
- Phylum: Arthropoda
- Class: Insecta
- Order: Lepidoptera
- Family: Pyralidae
- Genus: Neodavisia
- Species: N. melusina

Binomial name
- Neodavisia melusina Ferguson, Blanchard & Knudson, 1984

= Neodavisia melusina =

Species of moth

Neodavisia melusina is a species of snout moth in the family Pyralidae. It is found in Mexico and bordering regions of the United States (Texas).
