= Cardamyla didymalis =

Scientific classification
- Kingdom: Animalia
- Phylum: Arthropoda
- Class: Insecta
- Order: Lepidoptera
- Family: Pyralidae
- Genus: Cardamyla
- Species: C. didymalis

Binomial name
- Cardamyla didymalis Walker, 1859

Synonyms
- Balanotis arctandalis Lucas, 1890

Species of moth

Cardamyla didymalis is a species of snout moth in the genus Cardamyla. It was described by Francis Walker in 1859 and is known from Australia.

The snout moth is about 40 mm. Adults are generally black and white.
