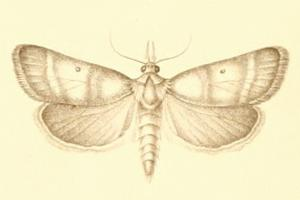

Scientific classification
- Domain: Eukaryota
- Kingdom: Animalia
- Phylum: Arthropoda
- Class: Insecta
- Order: Lepidoptera
- Family: Pyralidae
- Genus: Stemmatophora
- Species: S. vulpecalis

Binomial name
- Stemmatophora vulpecalis Ragonot, 1891

= Stemmatophora vulpecalis =

Species of moth

Stemmatophora vulpecalis is a species of snout moth. It is found in Spain and Algeria.

The wingspan is about 20 mm.
