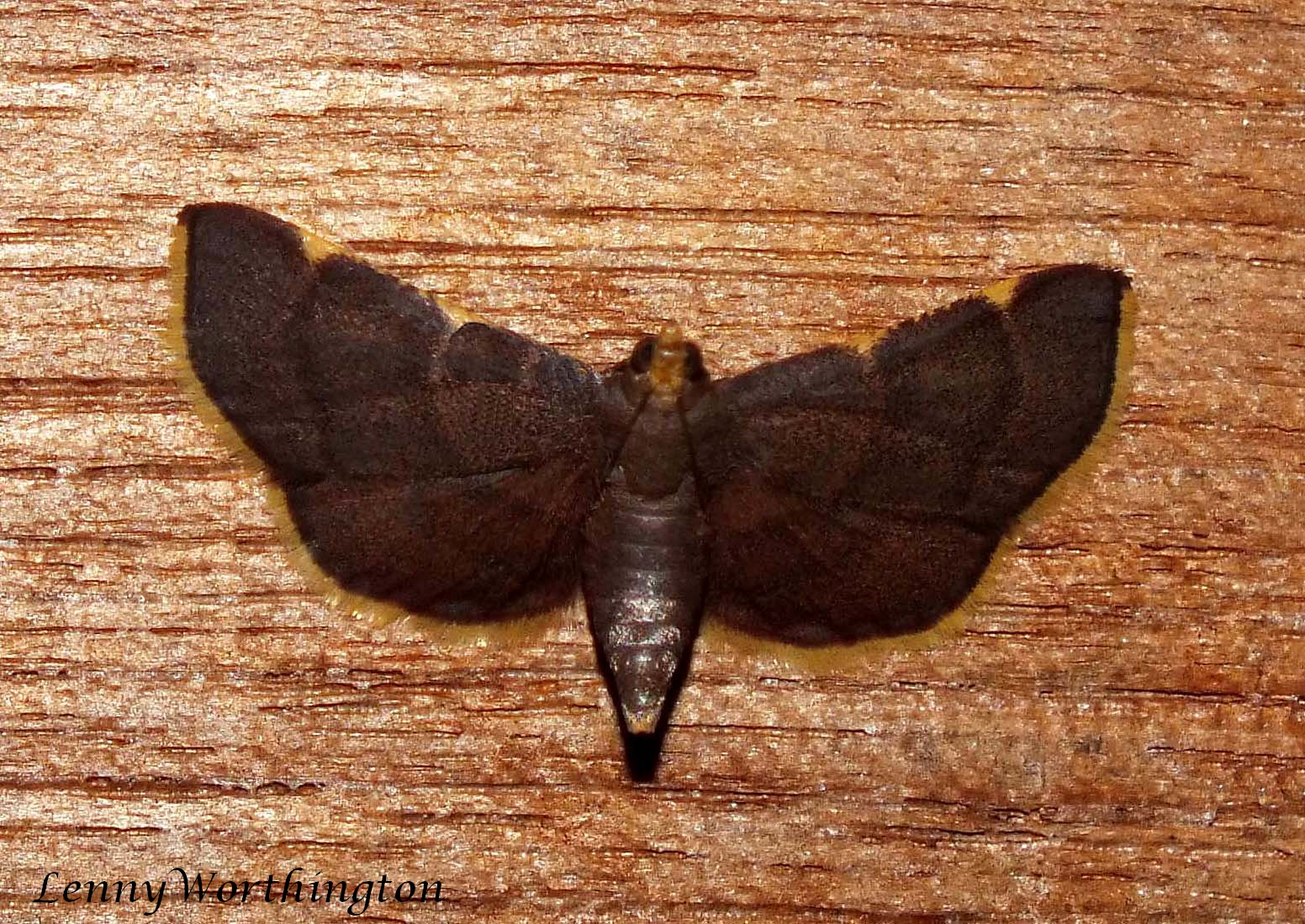

Scientific classification
- Kingdom: Animalia
- Phylum: Arthropoda
- Clade: Pancrustacea
- Class: Insecta
- Order: Lepidoptera
- Family: Pyralidae
- Tribe: Pyralini
- Genus: Herculia; Walker, 1859

Synonyms
- Bejuda Walker, [1866] Bleone Ragonot, 1890; Buzala Walker, 1863; Cisse Walker, 1863; Herculea (lapsus)

= Herculia (moth) =

Genus of moths

Herculia is a genus of moths belonging to the family Pyralidae. The genus is mostly treated as a synonym of Hypsopygia. If considered valid, some species previously placed here are now in Dolichomia and Ocrasa, which in turn are also mostly merged in Hypsopygia. O. fulvocilialis is sometimes still placed in the present genus.

== Species ==
Species include:

- Herculia admetalis
- Herculia costigeralis
- Herculia formosibia
- Herculia fuscicostalis
- Herculia hartigialis
- Herculia incongrua
- Herculia japonica
- Herculia jezoensis
- Herculia lacteocilia
- Herculia lucidalis
- Herculia marthalis
- Herculia medialis
- Herculia melanthalis
- Herculia meridocrossa
- Herculia moramangalis
- Herculia mus
- Herculia nigralis
- Herculia nigrivitta
- Herculia nonusalis
- Herculia ochreicilia
- Herculia orthogramma
- Herculia pelasgalis
- Herculia pernigralis
- Herculia perpulverea
- Herculia perrubralis
- Herculia productalis
- Herculia purpureorufa
- Herculia pyrerythra
- Herculia pyrrholepidis
- Herculia racilialis
- Herculia roseotincta
- Herculia rubidalis
- Herculia rubrica
- Herculia rudis
- Herculia sericea
- Herculia sokutsensis
- Herculia suffusalis
- Herculia tabidalis
- Herculia taiwanalis
- Herculia thyellodes
- Herculia tristalis
- Herculia umbrosalis
- Herculia vulgaris

== Navigation Links ==
Classification

=== Classification ===
- KingdomAnimaliaanimals Animalia: information (1)Animalia: pictures (22861)Animalia: specimens (7109)Animalia: sounds (722)Animalia: maps (42)
- ClassInsectainsects Insecta: information (1)Insecta: pictures (6359)Insecta: specimens (106)Insecta: sounds (13)
- OrderLepidoptera Lepidoptera: information (1)Lepidoptera: pictures (4407)Lepidoptera: specimens (104)
- FamilyPyralidae Pyralidae: pictures (158)
- GenusHerculia
