= Cardamyla hercophora =

Scientific classification
- Kingdom: Animalia
- Phylum: Arthropoda
- Class: Insecta
- Order: Lepidoptera
- Family: Pyralidae
- Genus: Cardamyla
- Species: C. hercophora

Binomial name
- Cardamyla hercophora (Meyrick, 1884)

Synonyms
- Balanotis hercophora Meyrick, 1884

Species of moth

Cardamyla hercophora is a species of snout moth in the genus Cardamyla. It was described by Edward Meyrick in 1884. It is found in Australia.
