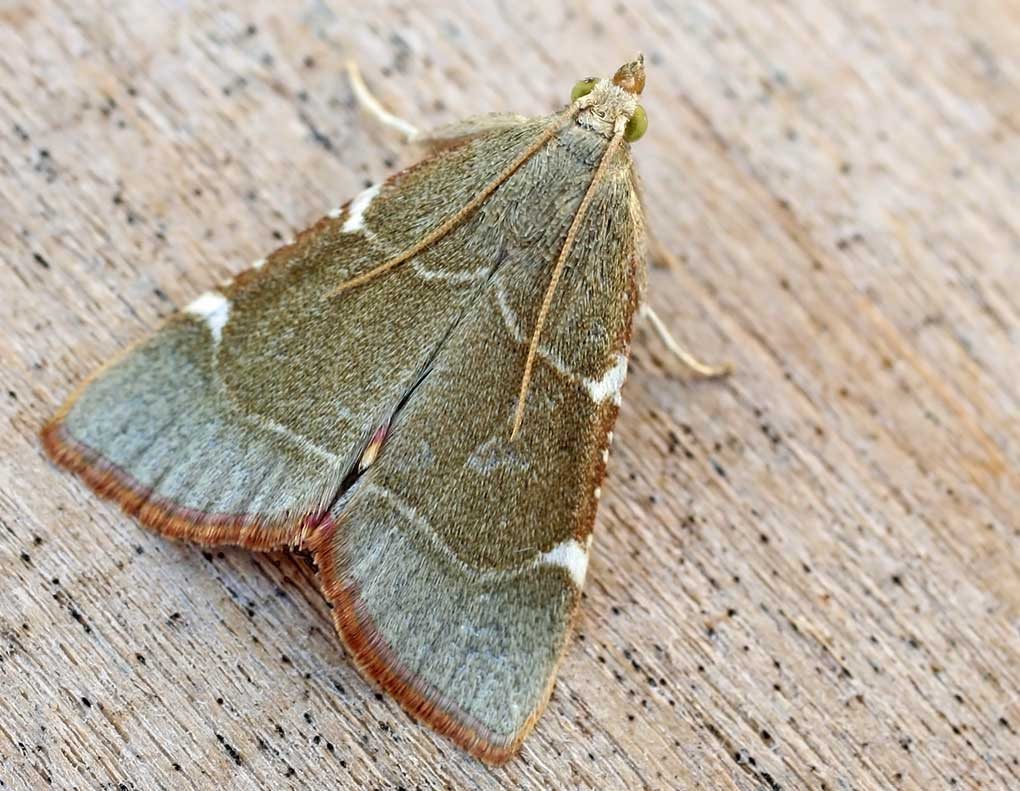

Scientific classification
- Kingdom: Animalia
- Phylum: Arthropoda
- Clade: Pancrustacea
- Class: Insecta
- Order: Lepidoptera
- Family: Pyralidae
- Genus: Hypsopygia
- Species: H. fulvocilialis

Binomial name
- Hypsopygia fulvocilialis (Duponchel, 1834)

Synonyms
- Asopia fulvocilialis Duponchel, 1834; Ocrasa fulvocilialis; Herculia fulvocilialis; Herculia fulvocilialis var. hartigialis Mariani, 1937

= Hypsopygia fulvocilialis =

Species of moth

Hypsopygia fulvocilialis is a moth of the family Pyralidae. It is found in Southern Europe, as far north as Hungary. It used to be (and sometimes still is) placed in the genus Herculia.

The moth flies from May to September depending on the location.
