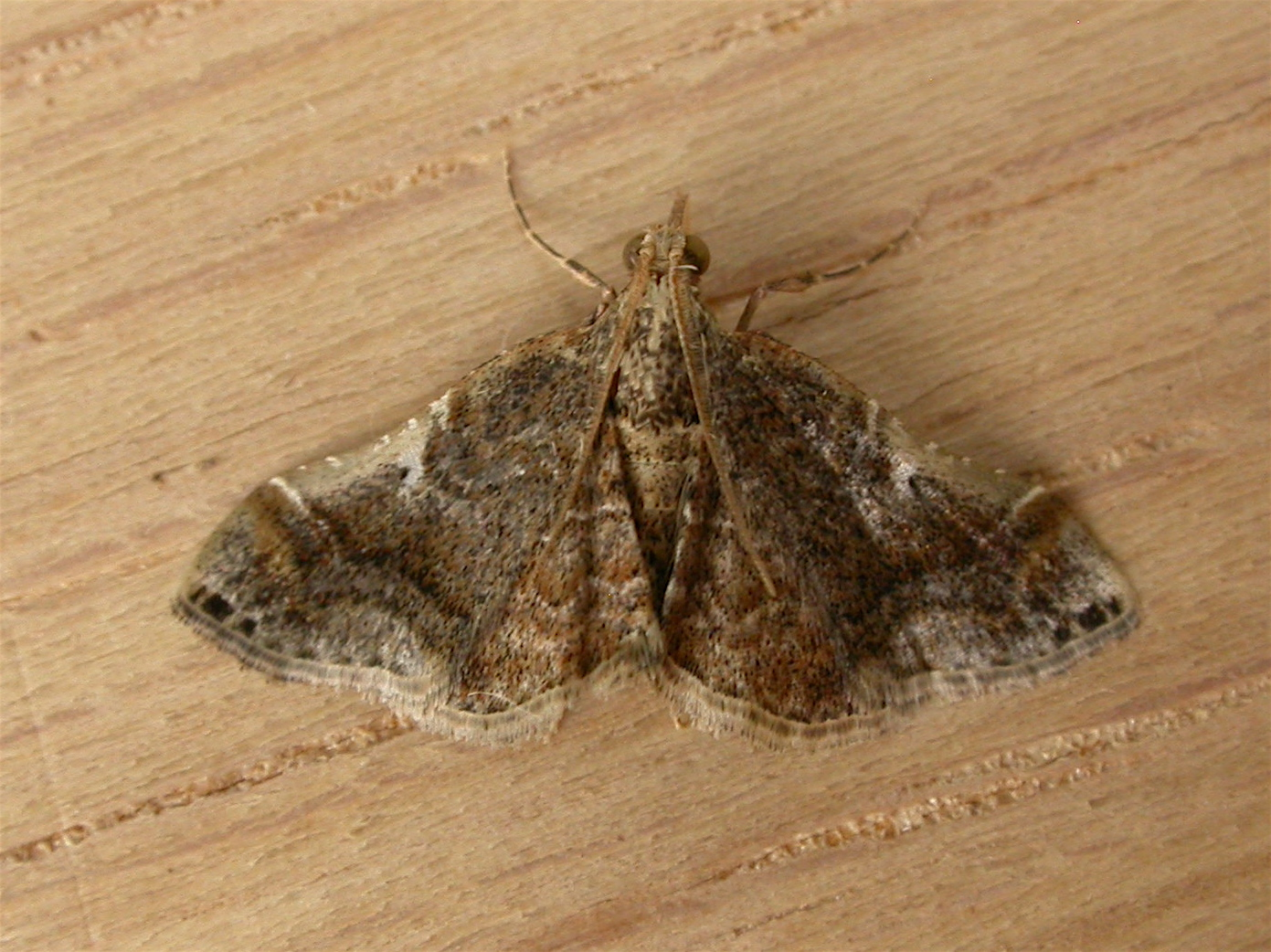
- Scenedra decoratalis

Scientific classification
- Kingdom: Animalia
- Phylum: Arthropoda
- Class: Insecta
- Order: Lepidoptera
- Family: Pyralidae
- Tribe: Pyralini
- Genus: Scenedra; Meyrick, 1884

= Scenedra =

Genus of moths

Scenedra is a genus of snout moths described by Edward Meyrick in 1884.

== Species ==
- Scenedra decoratalis (Walker, [1866])
- Scenedra umbrosalis (Wileman, 1911)
