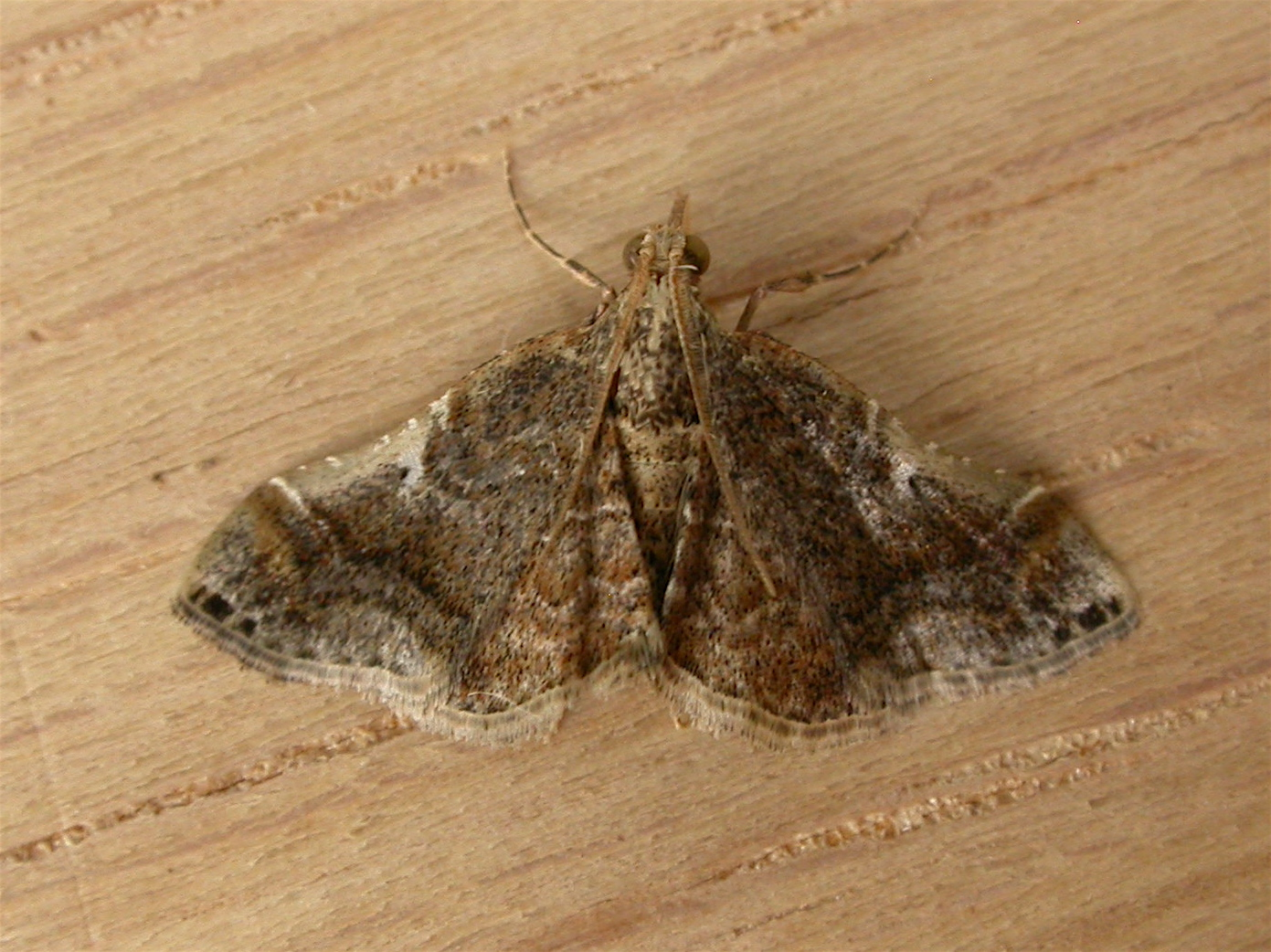

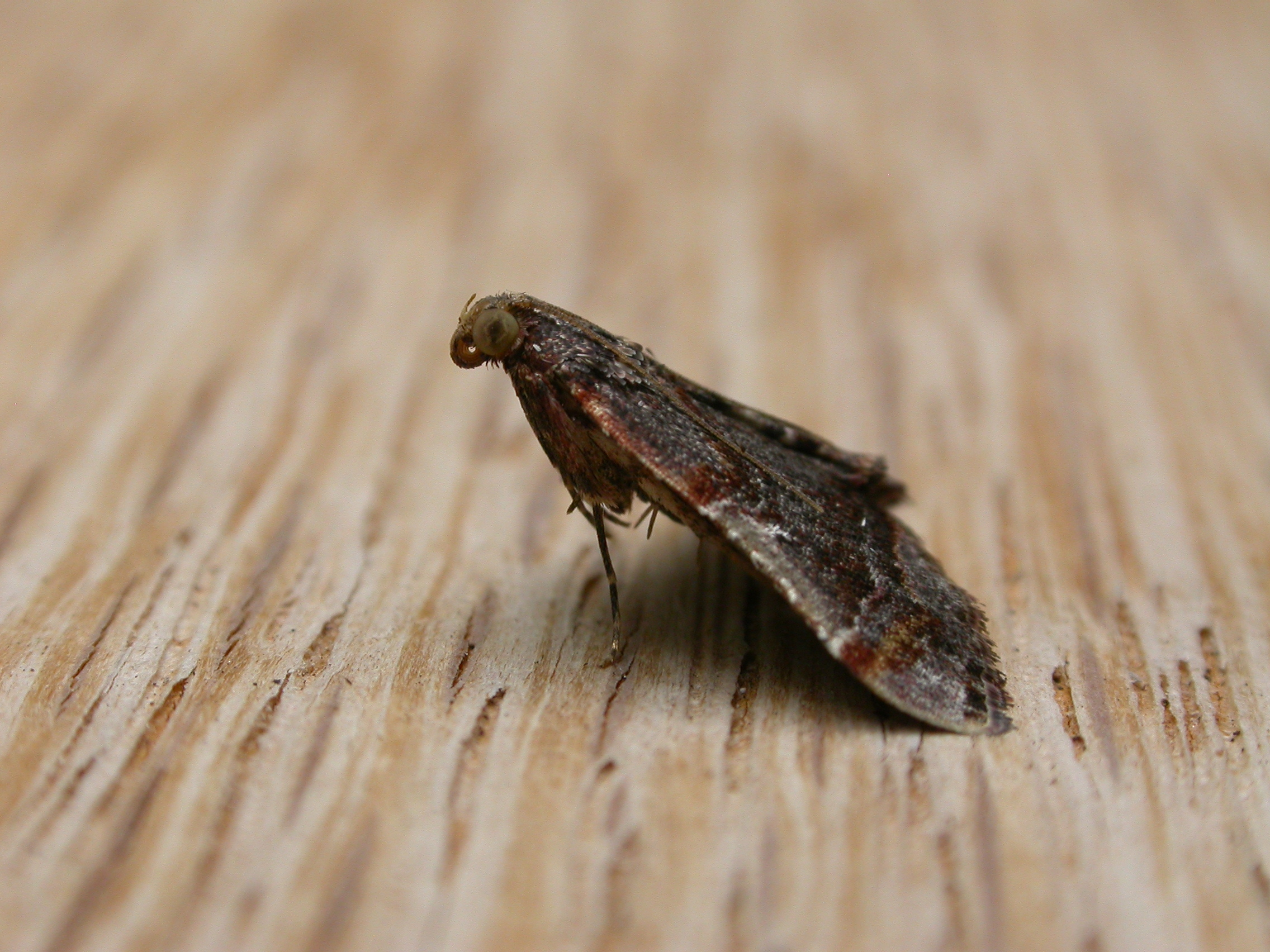

Scientific classification
- Kingdom: Animalia
- Phylum: Arthropoda
- Class: Insecta
- Order: Lepidoptera
- Family: Pyralidae
- Genus: Scenedra
- Species: S. decoratalis

Binomial name
- Scenedra decoratalis (Walker, 1866)

Synonyms
- Pyralis decoratalis Walker, [1866]; Pyralis contentalis Walker, [1866]

= Scenedra decoratalis =

Species of moth

Scenedra decoratalis is a moth of the family Pyralidae. It is found in Australia.
