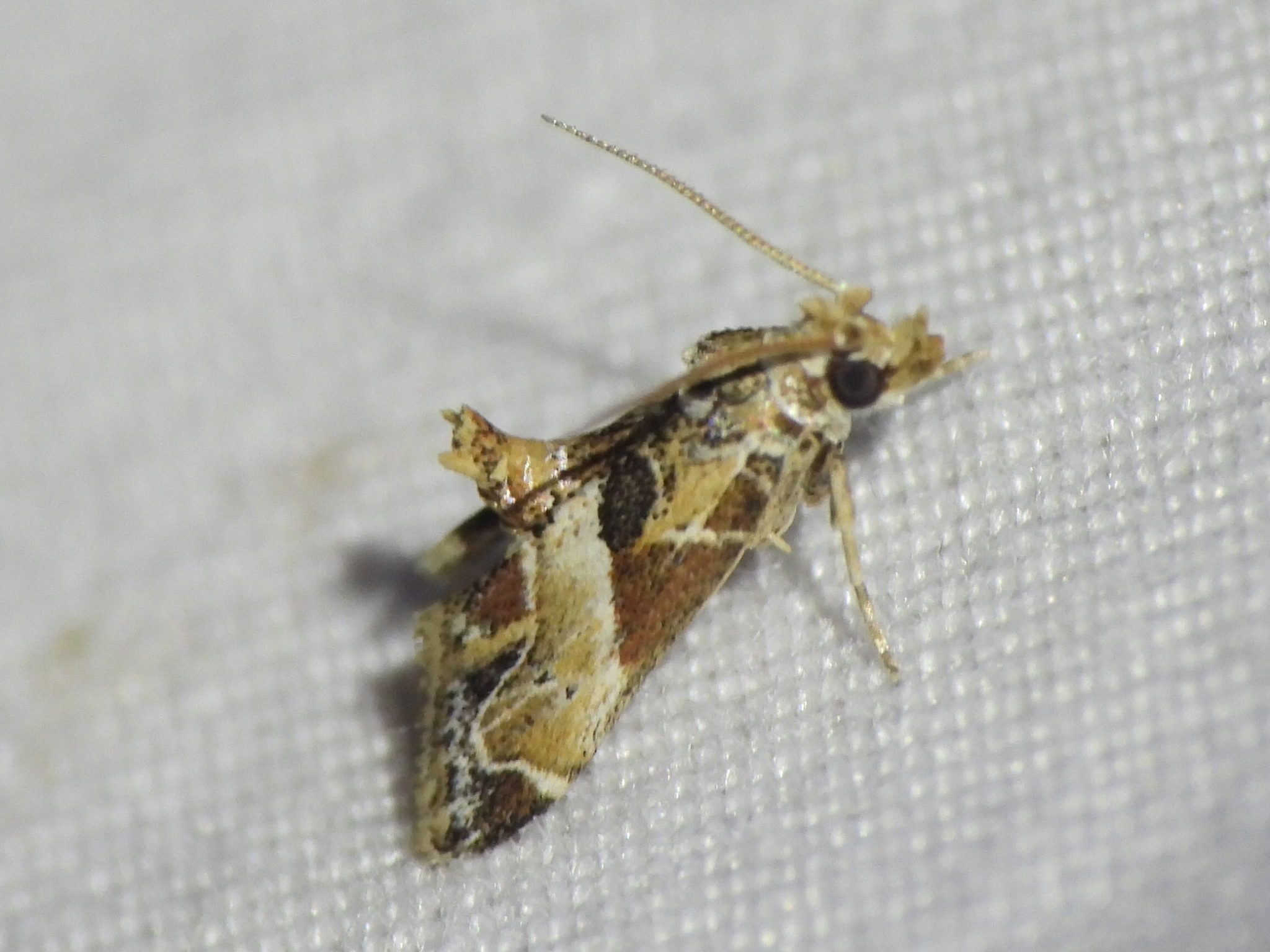
- Neodavisia melusina

Scientific classification
- Domain: Eukaryota
- Kingdom: Animalia
- Phylum: Arthropoda
- Class: Insecta
- Order: Lepidoptera
- Family: Pyralidae
- Genus: Neodavisia; Barnes & McDunnough, 1914

= Neodavisia =

Genus of moths

Neodavisia is a genus of snout moths in the family Pyralidae. It was first described by William Barnes and James Halliday McDunnough in 1914.

== Species ==
- Neodavisia melusina
- Neodavisia singularis (Barnes & McDunnough, 1913)
