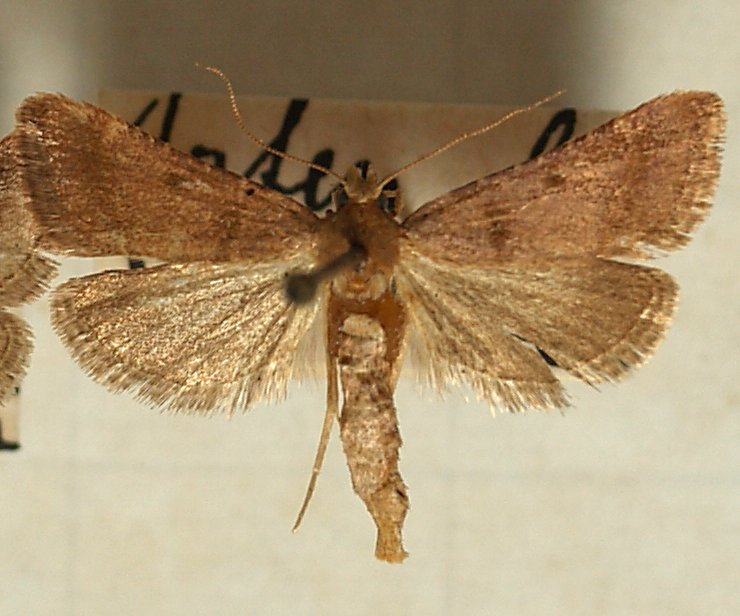

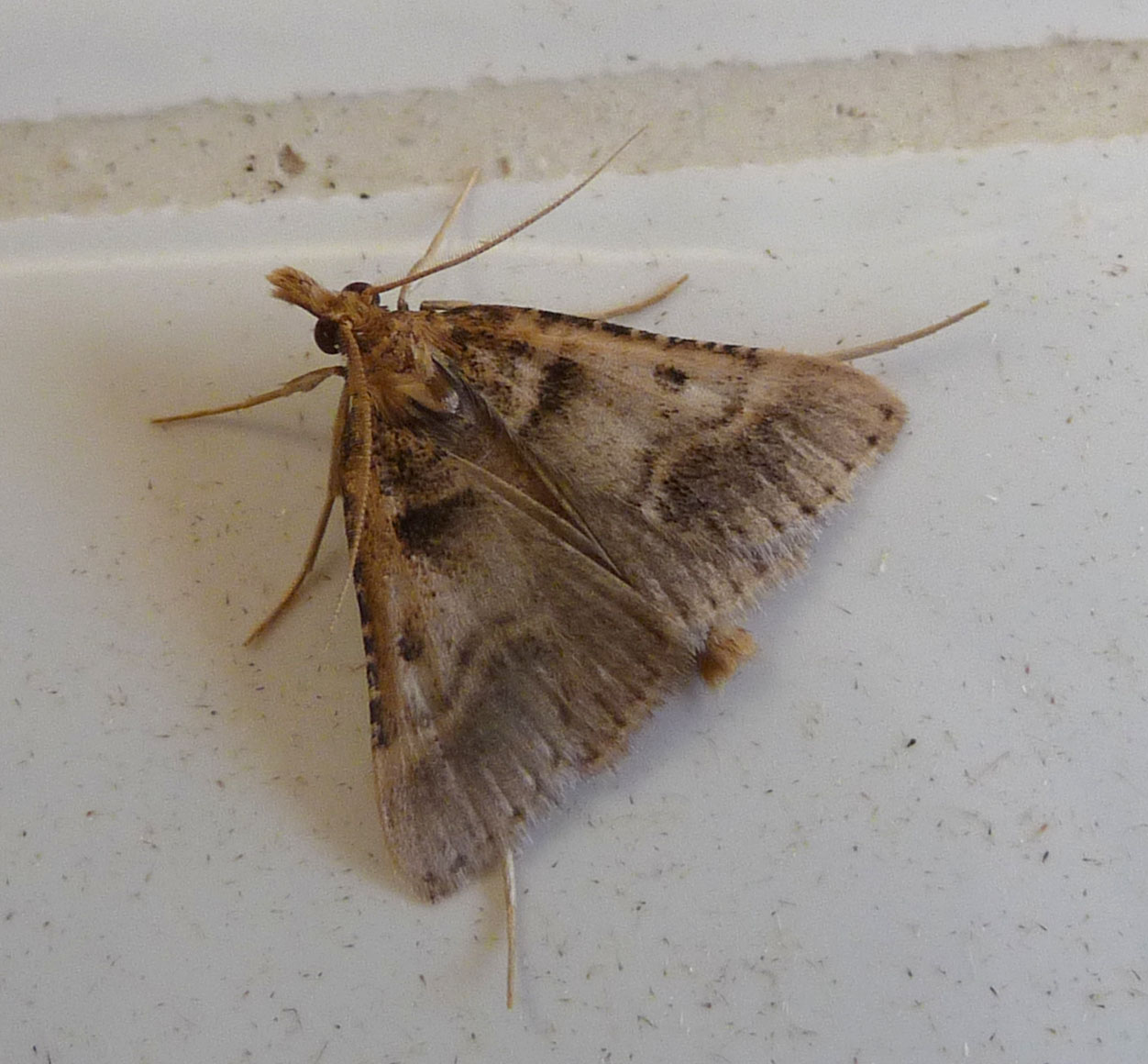

Scientific classification
- Domain: Eukaryota
- Kingdom: Animalia
- Phylum: Arthropoda
- Class: Insecta
- Order: Lepidoptera
- Family: Pyralidae
- Genus: Stemmatophora
- Species: S. brunnealis

Binomial name
- Stemmatophora brunnealis (Treitschke, 1829)

Synonyms
- Pyralis brunnealis Treitschke, 1829; Actenia brunnealis; Actenia brunnealis ab. nigrobrunnealis Schawerda, 1941; Actenia brunnealis f. lividalis Costantini, 1922; Actenia phaealis Hampson, 1900

= Stemmatophora brunnealis =

Species of moth

Stemmatophora brunnealis is a moth of the family Pyralidae. It is found in Southern Europe and North Africa.
