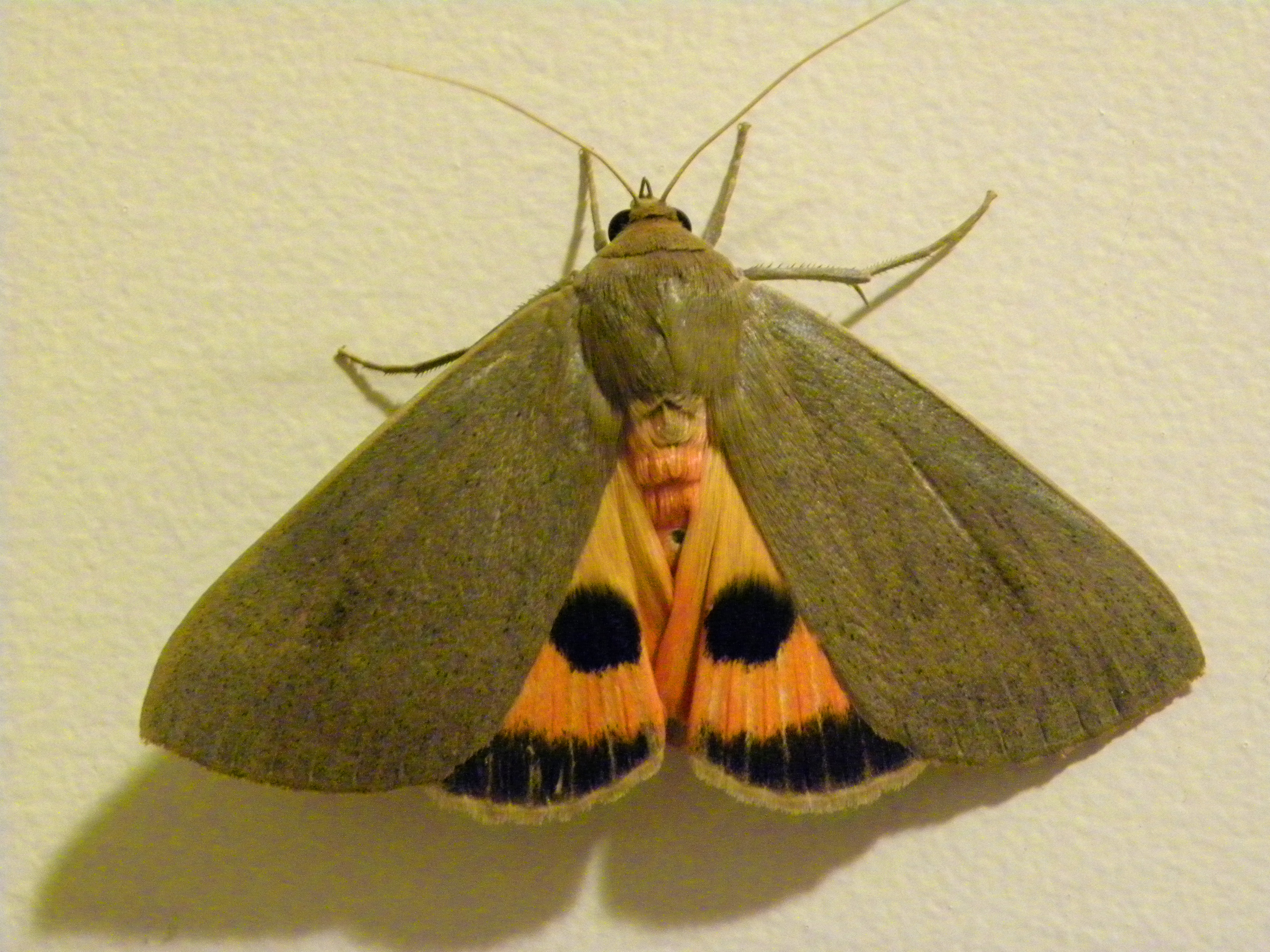

Scientific classification
- Kingdom: Animalia
- Phylum: Arthropoda
- Class: Insecta
- Order: Lepidoptera
- Family: Pyralidae
- Genus: Cardamyla
- Species: C. carinentalis

Binomial name
- Cardamyla carinentalis Walker, 1859

= Cardamyla carinentalis =

Species of moth

Cardamyla carinentalis is a species of snout moth in the genus Cardamyla. It was described by Francis Walker in 1859, and is known from the northern half of Australia, including Queensland and New South Wales.
