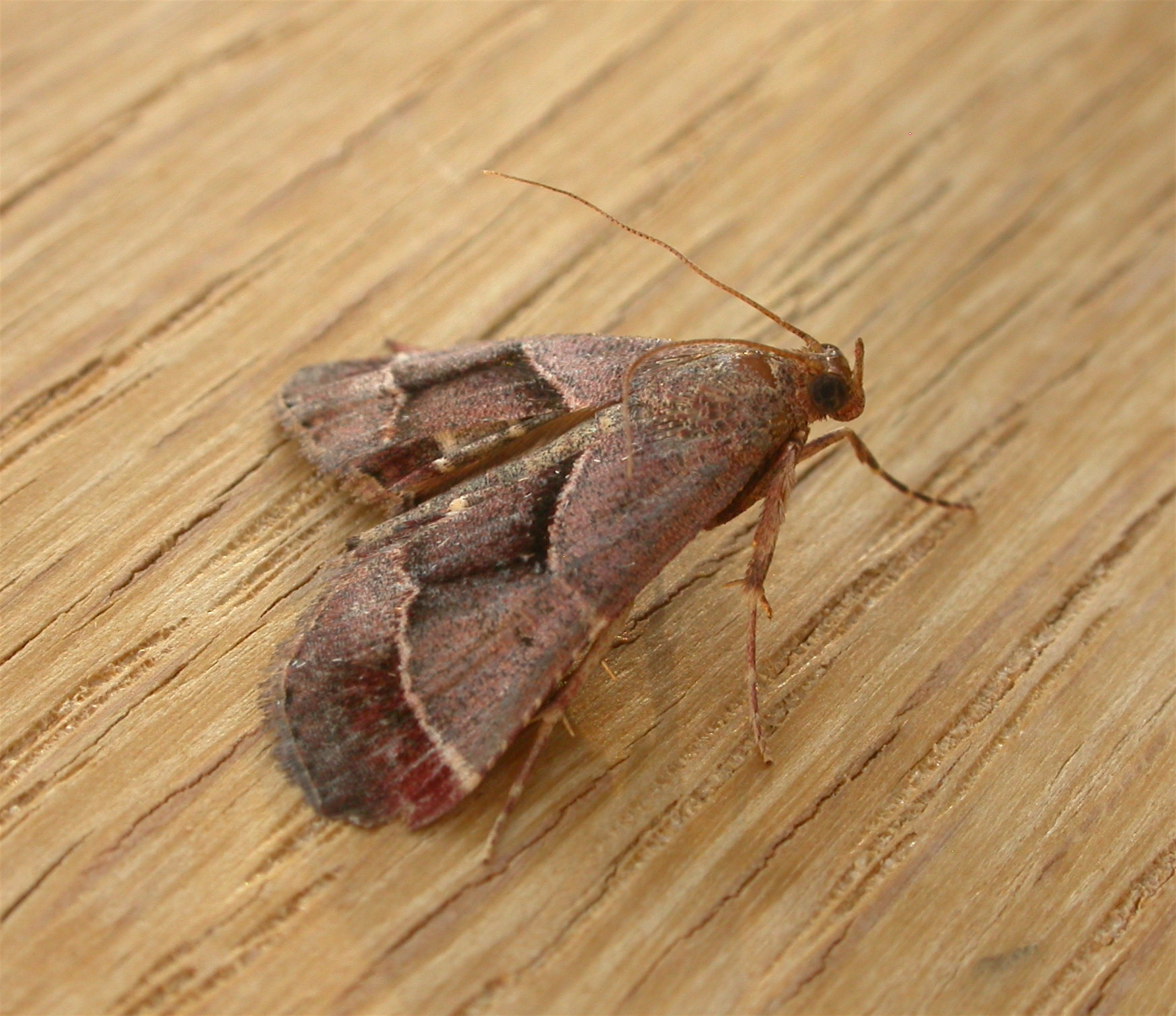

Scientific classification
- Kingdom: Animalia
- Phylum: Arthropoda
- Class: Insecta
- Order: Lepidoptera
- Family: Pyralidae
- Genus: Gauna
- Species: G. aegusalis

Binomial name
- Gauna aegusalis Walker, 1858

Synonyms
- Pyralis aegusalis Walker, [1858]; Gauna subferralis Walker, [1866]; Gauna aegalis

= Gauna aegusalis =

Species of moth

Gauna aegusalis is a moth of the family Pyralidae. It was described by Francis Walker in 1858 and is found in Australia and New Zealand.
