= Catalaodes =

Scientific classification
- Kingdom: Animalia
- Phylum: Arthropoda
- Class: Insecta
- Order: Lepidoptera
- Family: Pyralidae
- Subfamily: Epipaschiinae
- Genus: Catalaodes; Viette, 1953

Genus of moths

Catalaodes is a genus of snout moths. It was described by Pierre Viette in 1953. It is endemic to Madagascar.

== Species ==
There are two or three recognized species:

- Catalaodes analamalis (Viette, 1960)
- Catalaodes cyanifusalis (Marion, 1955)
- Catalaodes malgassicalis Viette, 1953

The Global Lepidoptera Index recognizes Catalaodes analamalis as Doddiana analamalis.
