= Doddiana callizona =

Scientific classification
- Domain: Eukaryota
- Kingdom: Animalia
- Phylum: Arthropoda
- Class: Insecta
- Order: Lepidoptera
- Family: Pyralidae
- Genus: Doddiana
- Species: D. callizona

Binomial name
- Doddiana callizona (Lower, 1896)

Synonyms
- Stericta callizona Lower, 1896

Species of moth

Doddiana callizona is a species of snout moth. It was described by Oswald Bertram Lower in 1896 and is found in Australia.
