= Doddiana =

Scientific classification
- Domain: Eukaryota
- Kingdom: Animalia
- Phylum: Arthropoda
- Class: Insecta
- Order: Lepidoptera
- Family: Pyralidae
- Subfamily: Epipaschiinae
- Genus: Doddiana; Turner, 1902

Genus of moths

Doddiana is a genus of snout moths. It was described by Alfred Jefferis Turner in 1902.

== Species ==
- Doddiana analamalis Viette, 1960
- Doddiana callizona Lower, 1896
- Doddiana cyanifusalis Marion, 1955
- Doddiana tonkinalis Viette, 1960
