= Doddiana cyanifusalis =

Scientific classification
- Domain: Eukaryota
- Kingdom: Animalia
- Phylum: Arthropoda
- Class: Insecta
- Order: Lepidoptera
- Family: Pyralidae
- Genus: Doddiana
- Species: D. cyanifusalis

Binomial name
- Doddiana cyanifusalis Marion, 1955

Species of moth

Doddiana cyanifusalis is a species of snout moth. It was described by Hubert Marion in 1955 and is found on Madagascar.
