= Doddiana analamalis =

Scientific classification
- Kingdom: Animalia
- Phylum: Arthropoda
- Class: Insecta
- Order: Lepidoptera
- Family: Pyralidae
- Genus: Doddiana
- Species: D. analamalis

Binomial name
- Doddiana analamalis Viette, 1960

Species of moth

Doddiana analamalis is a species of snout moth. It was described by Pierre Viette in 1960 and is found on Madagascar.
