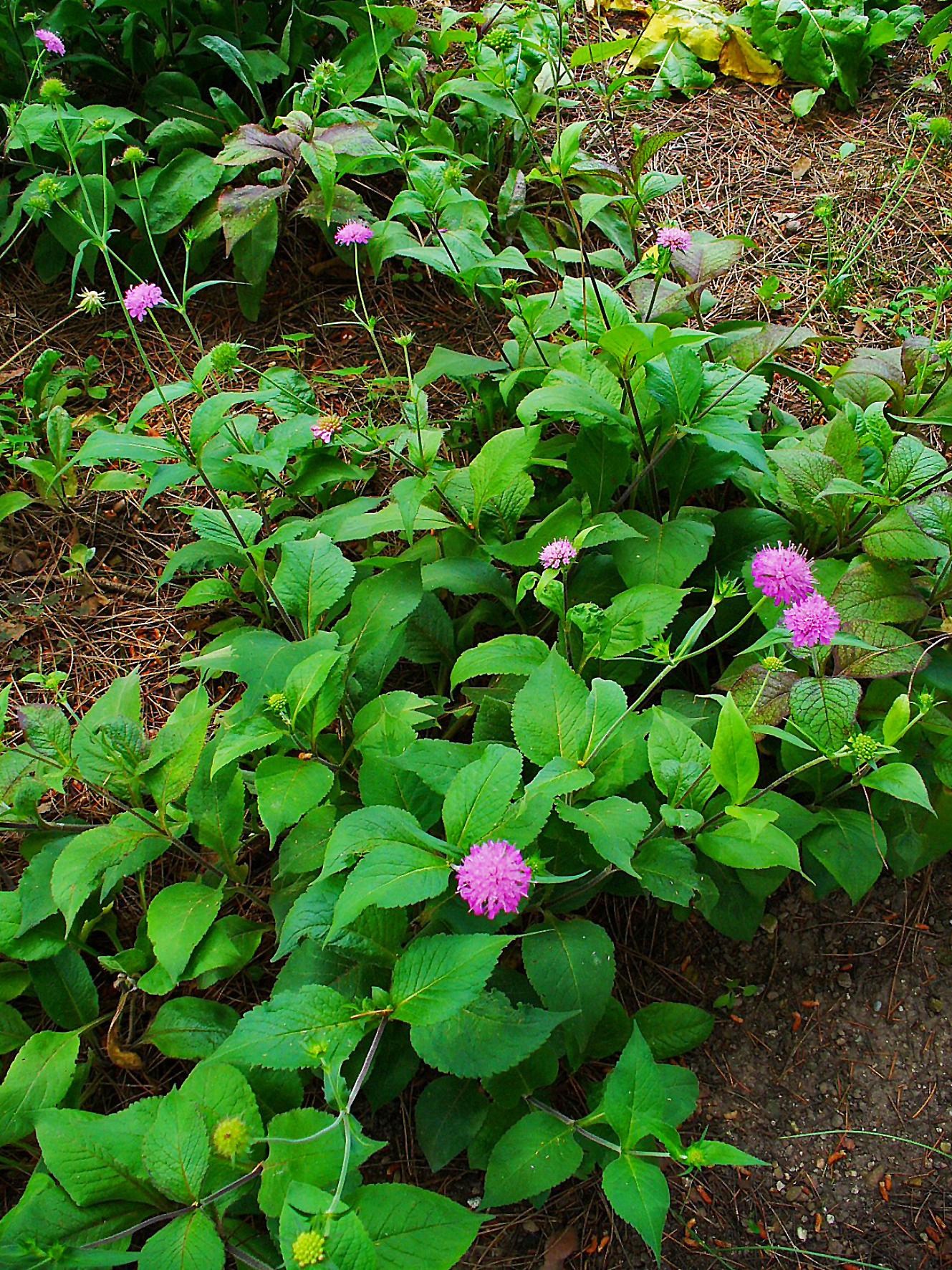

Scientific classification
- Kingdom: Plantae
- Clade: Tracheophytes
- Clade: Angiosperms
- Clade: Eudicots
- Clade: Asterids
- Order: Dipsacales
- Family: Caprifoliaceae
- Genus: Knautia
- Species: K. drymeia

Binomial name
- Knautia drymeia Heuff., 1856

Synonyms
- Asterocephalus ciliata Raf.; Knautia ciliata Coult.; Knautia dipsacifolia Heuff.; Scabiosa ciliata Kit.

= Knautia drymeia =

Species of plant

Knautia drymeia, commonly known as the Hungarian widow flower, is a herbaceous perennial plant species in the family Caprifoliaceae, that grows in Central and Southeastern Europe.

== Taxonomy ==
This species was first formally described by Austrian botanist Johann Heuffel in his work Flora 39 in 1856.

There are a few recognized subspecies of Knautia drymeia:

- Knautia drymeia subsp. centrifrons (Borbás) Ehrend.
- Knautia drymeia subsp. drymeia
- Knautia drymeia subsp. intermedia (Pernh. & Wettst.) Ehrend.
- Knautia drymeia subsp. nympharum (Boiss. & Heldr.) Ehrend.
- Knautia drymeia subsp. tergestina (Beck) Ehrend.

== Description ==
This upright-growing perennial widow flower can reach from 40 to 60 centimetres of height and is easily recognizable because of its leaf rosette, that gives rise to multiple flowering stems. The species's stem is hirsute, with leaves growing along the entire length. Its oppositely arranged simple and entire leaves are in most cases petiolate, covered with trichomes and lanceolate to ovate in shape. There are no stipules.

Knautia drymeia is known as a very morphologically variable species. The species' subspecies can be recognized by their vegetative parts, especially their leaves' characteristics. In subspecies drymeia stem leaves are ovate to ovate-lanceolate in shape, while basal leaves have whiteish bristles. On the other hand, subspecies intermedia can be determined by yellowish bristles of basal leaves, while its stem leaves are either oblong either lanceolate. Subspecies tergestina has similarly coloured bristles of basal leaves as ssp. drymeia (white to gray), but its stem leaves are round to widely ovate and deeply serrated.

Its flowers are united into so-called calathidium inflorescences, that are surrounded by lanceolate involucral leaves. Each zygomorphic flower consists of four floral leaves, with petals being scarlet, scarlet red, purple and in rare cases even white. The plant's sepals are reduced into very short and pointy flower bristles, that are usually in groups of 8. Knautia drymeia has so-called inferior ovary, with flower elements being set above it.

Knautia drymeia flowers between June and September and is pollinated by insects (entomophily). Its hirsute fruit is so-called achene and reaches from 4 to 5 mm of length. Layman can mistake Knautia drymeia with similar widow flowers, such as the common Knautia arvensis and Knautia dipsacifolia.

This species chromosome number is 2n = 40, with plants being polyploid; either diploid either tetraploid.

== Distribution and habitat ==
Knautia drymeia is a European species that prefers southern temperate and submeridional floristic zones, with its distribution area consisting of central and southeastern European countries. This relatively common widow flower can be found growing in various shaded forests with dense undergrowth, on the forest edges, as well as different meadows. Only rarely Knautia drymeia represents a part of anthropogenic vegetation.

The Raunkiær system classifies it as a hemicryptophyte species.

== Gallery ==
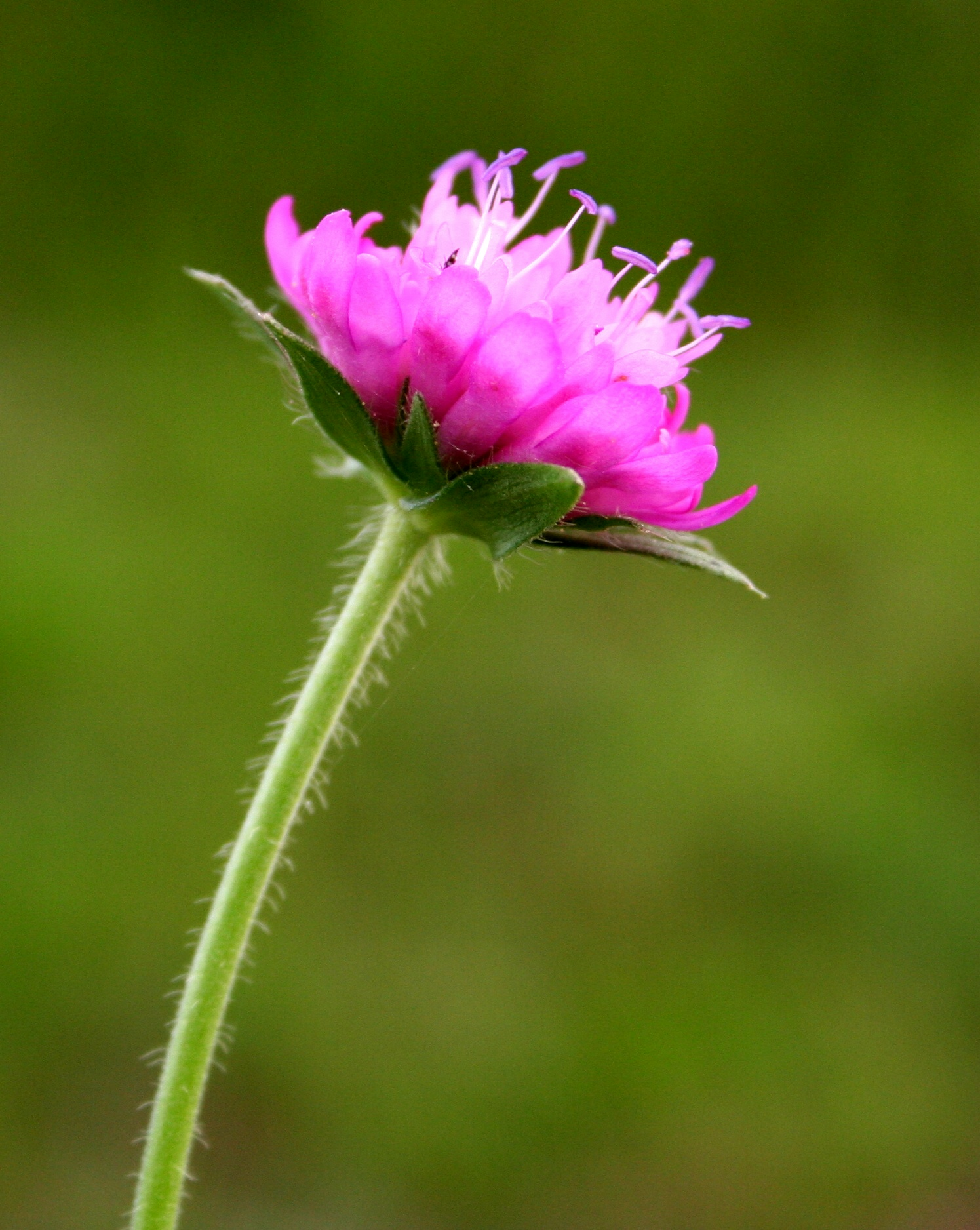

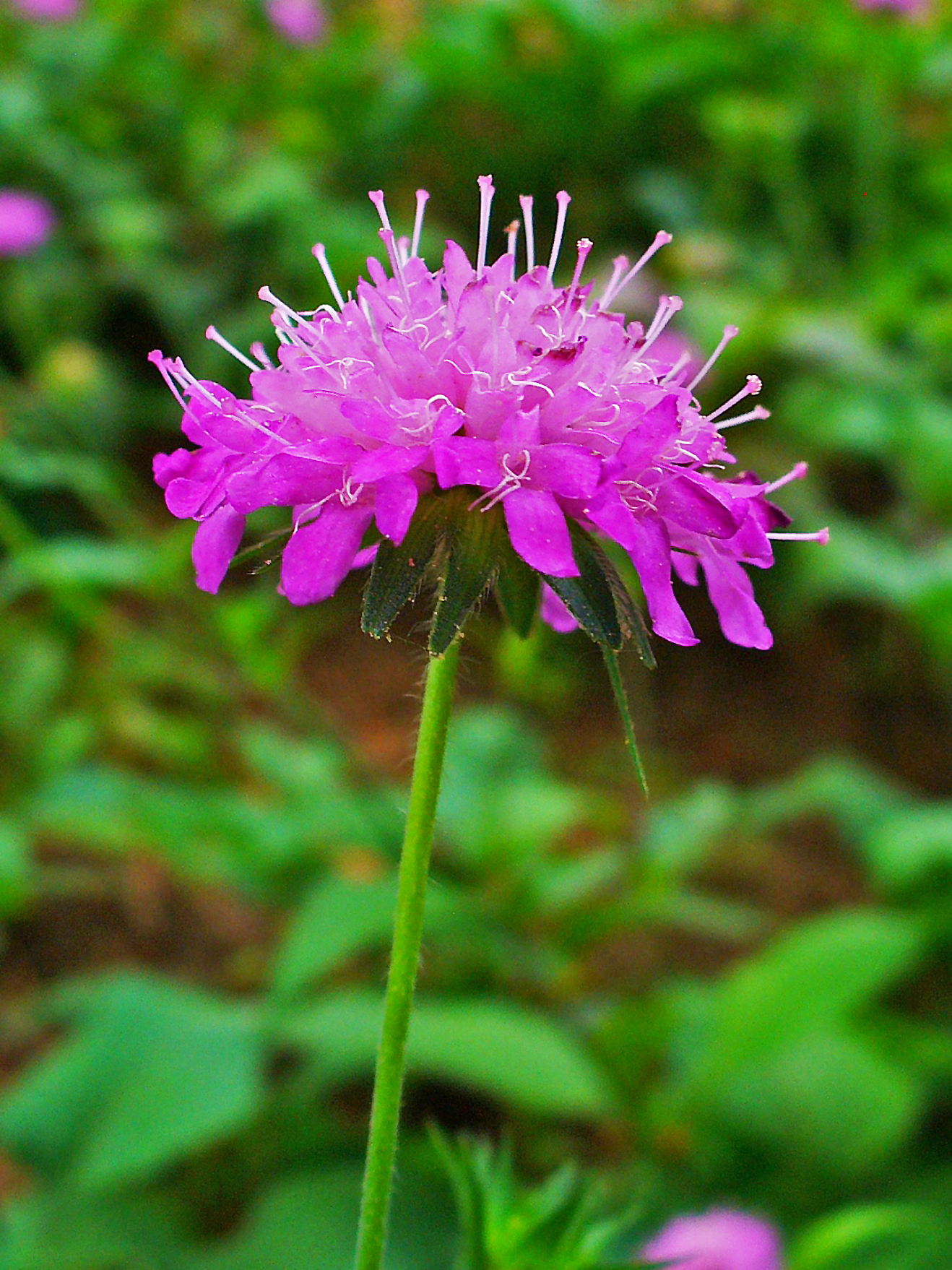

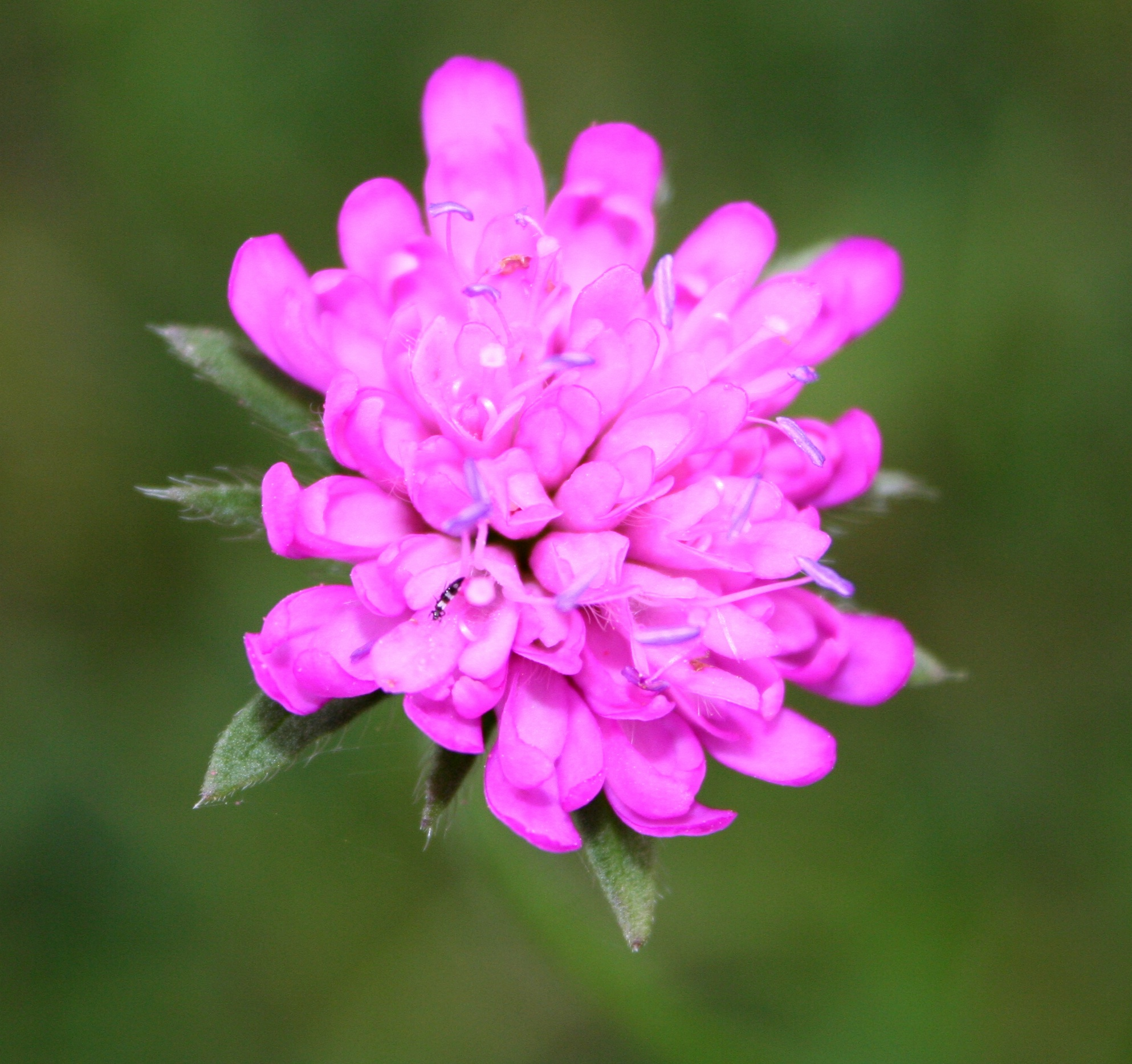

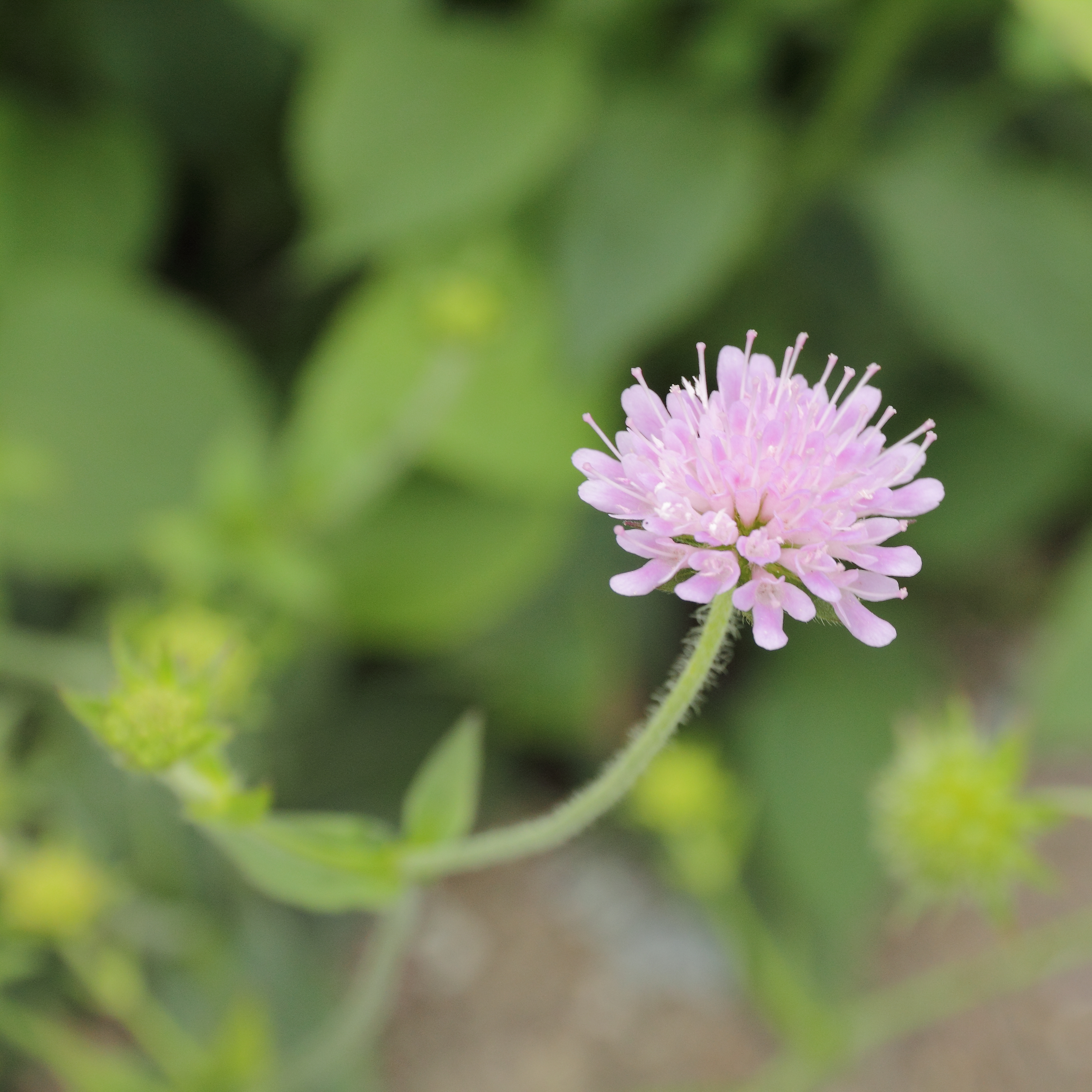

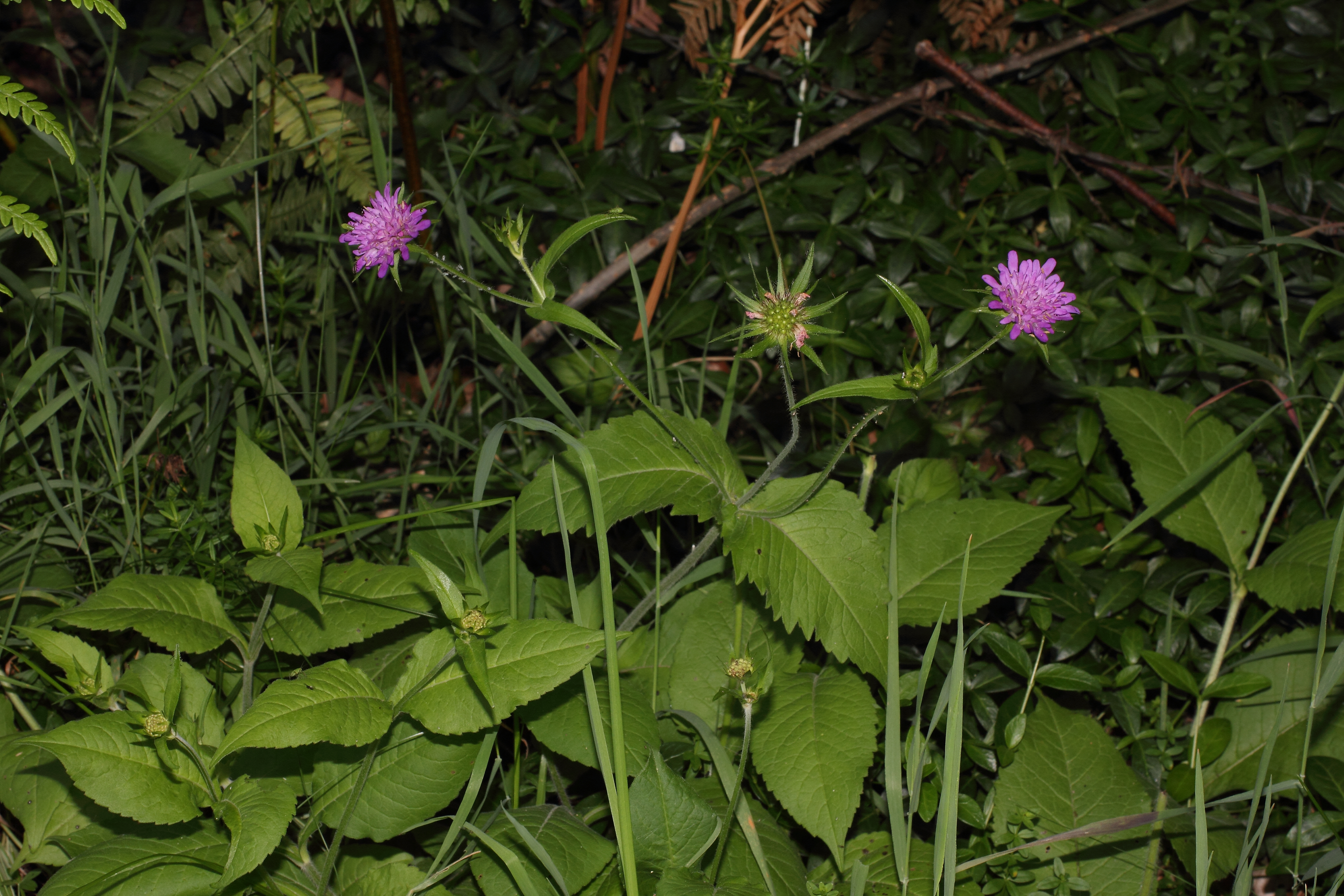

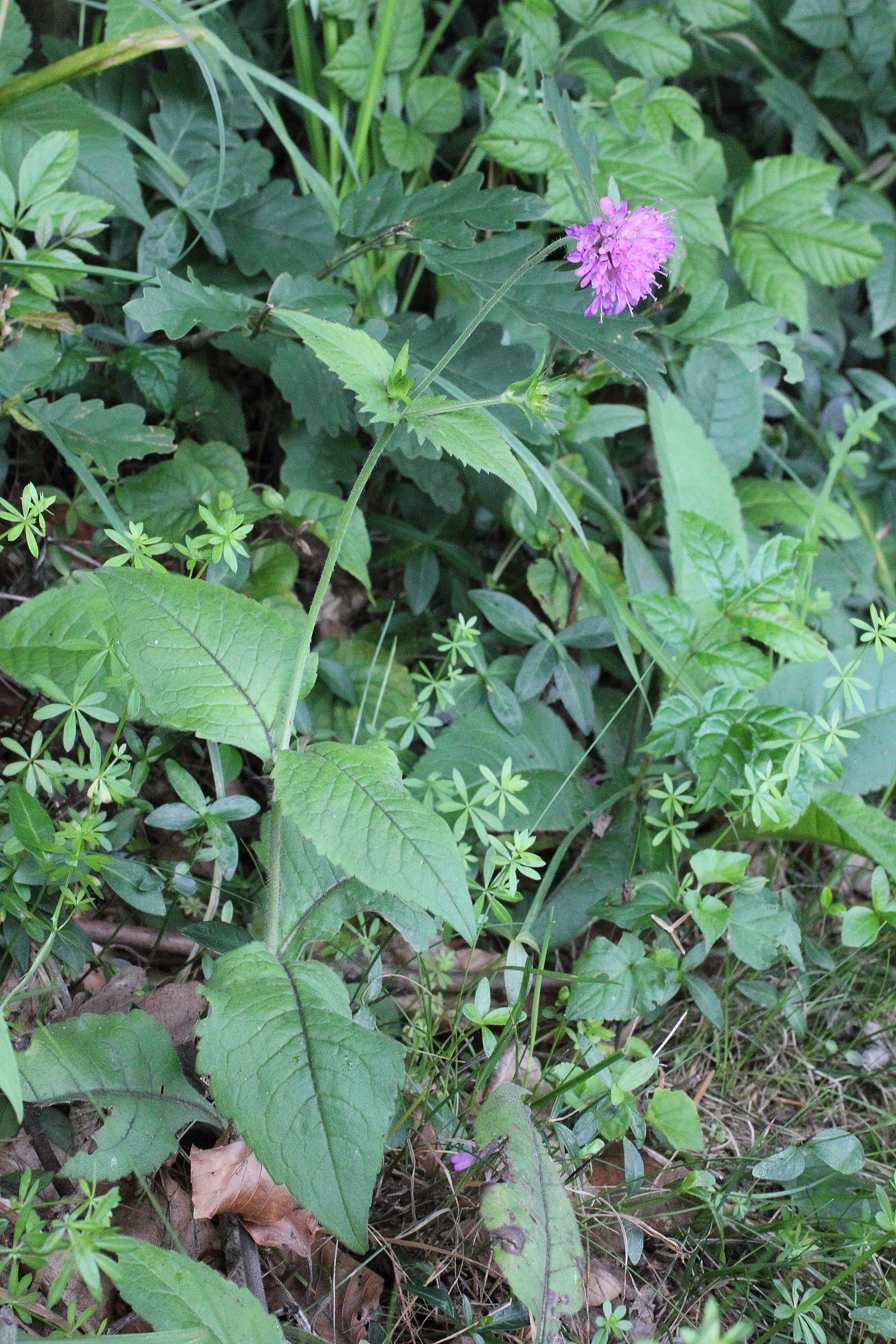

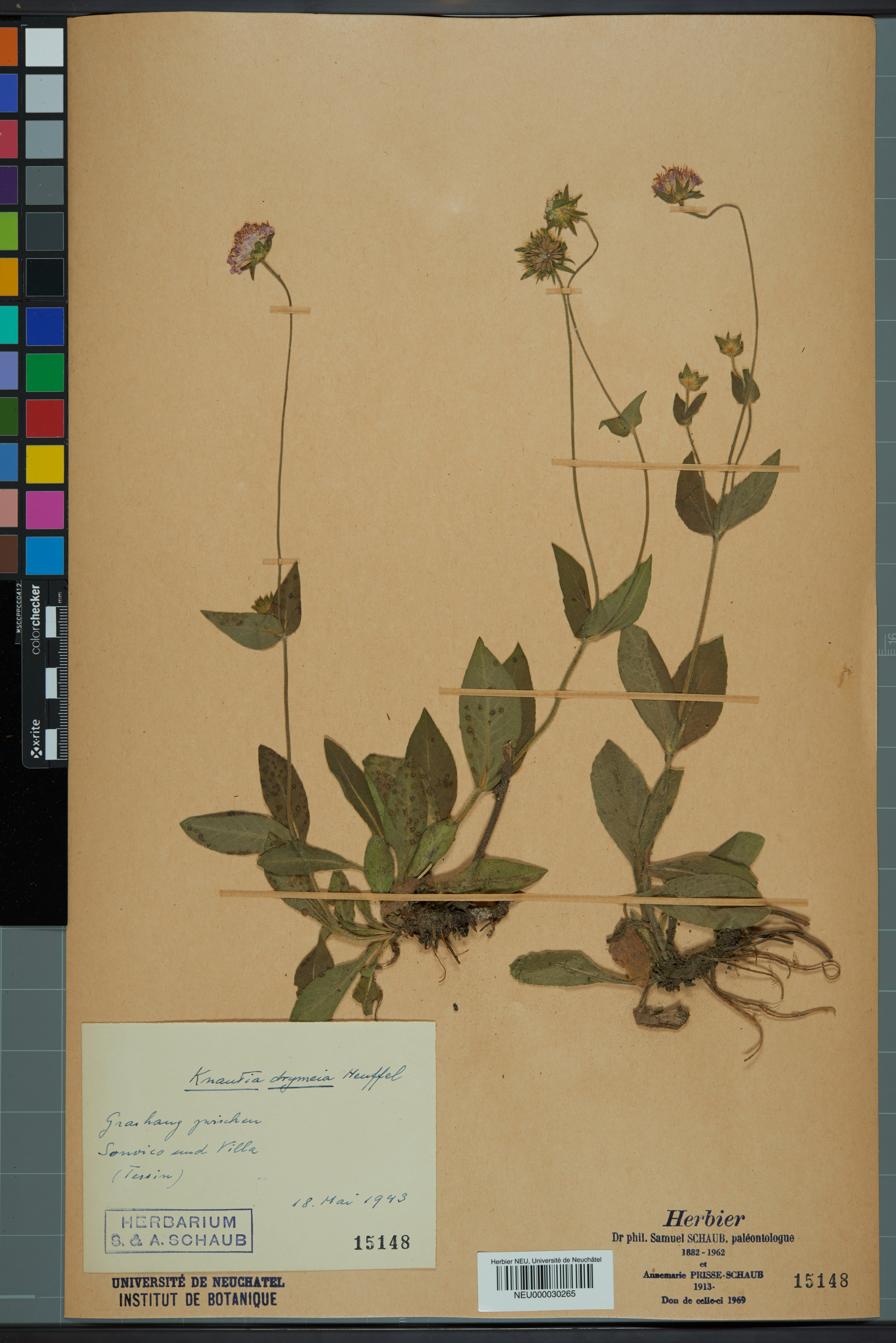

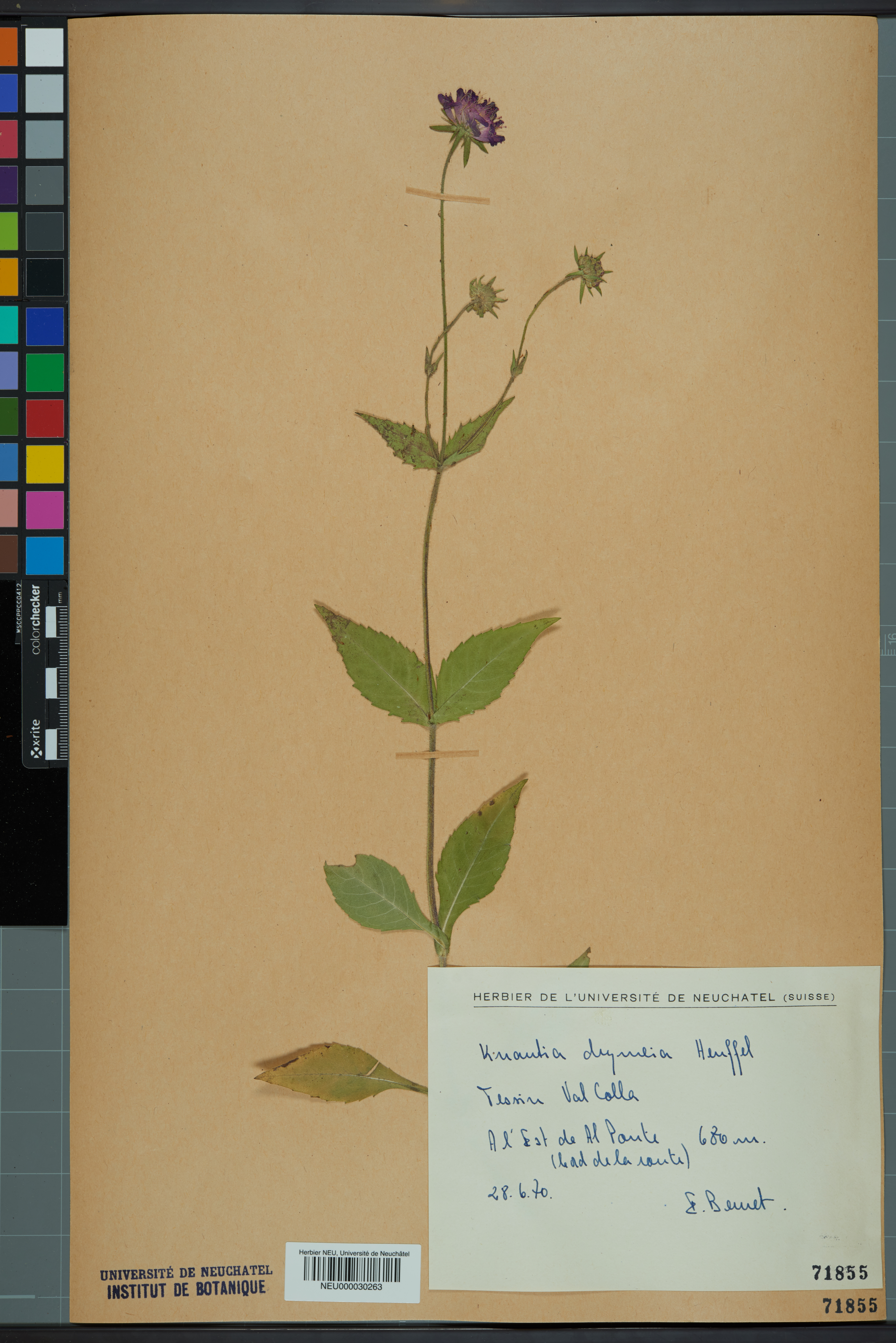
