= Eurythmia yavapaella =

Scientific classification
- Kingdom: Animalia
- Phylum: Arthropoda
- Class: Insecta
- Order: Lepidoptera
- Family: Pyralidae
- Genus: Eurythmia
- Species: E. yavapaella

Binomial name
- Eurythmia yavapaella Dyar, 1906

Species of moth

Eurythmia yavapaella is a species of snout moth in the genus Eurhodope. It was described by Harrison Gray Dyar Jr. in 1906, and is known from the US states of Arizona and California.

== Taxonomy ==
It was formerly treated as a subspecies of Eurythmia hospitella.
