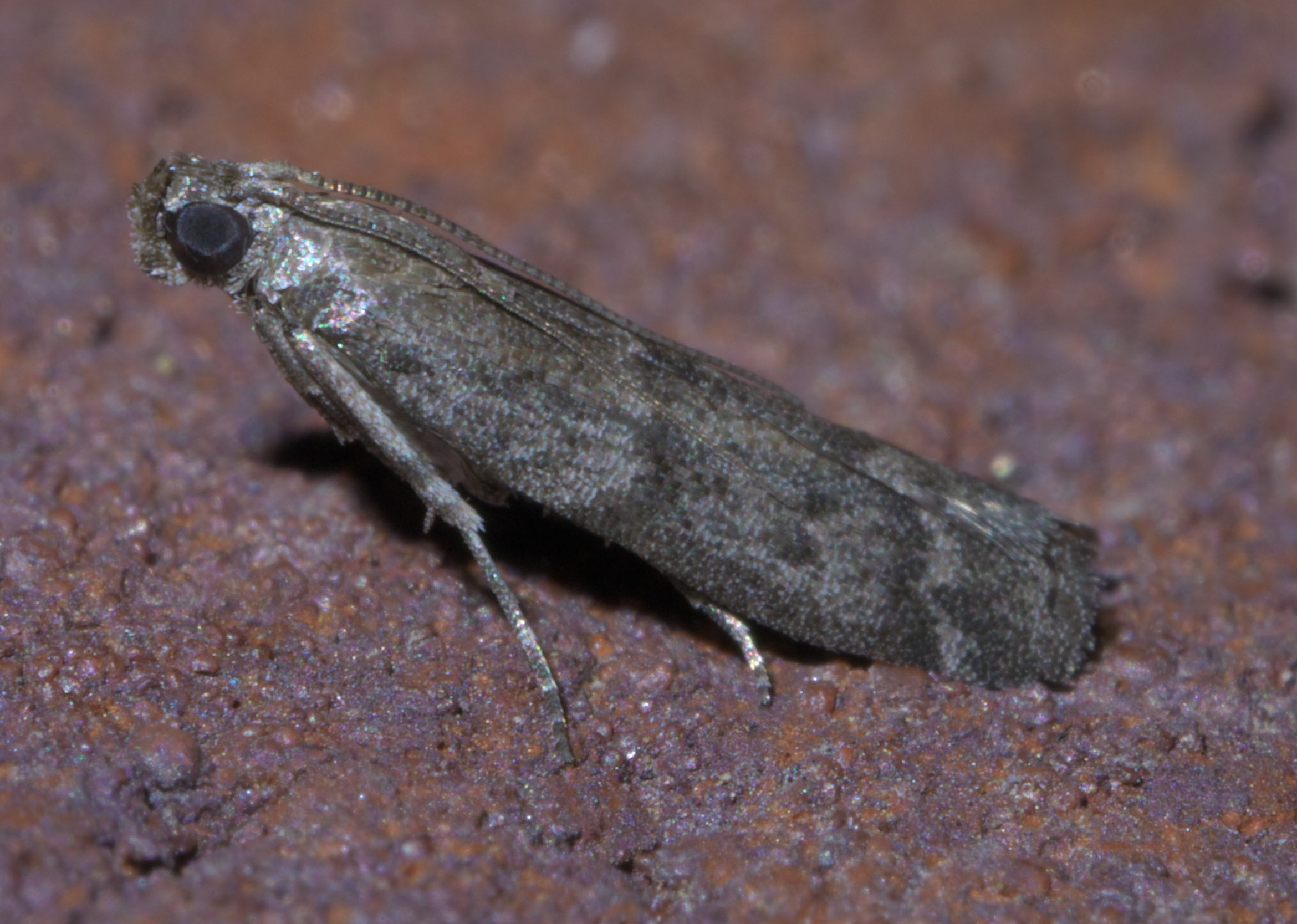

Scientific classification
- Kingdom: Animalia
- Phylum: Arthropoda
- Class: Insecta
- Order: Lepidoptera
- Family: Pyralidae
- Genus: Eurythmia
- Species: E. angulella

Binomial name
- Eurythmia angulella Ely, 1910

Synonyms
- Eurythmia diffusella Ely, 1910

= Eurythmia angulella =

Species of moth

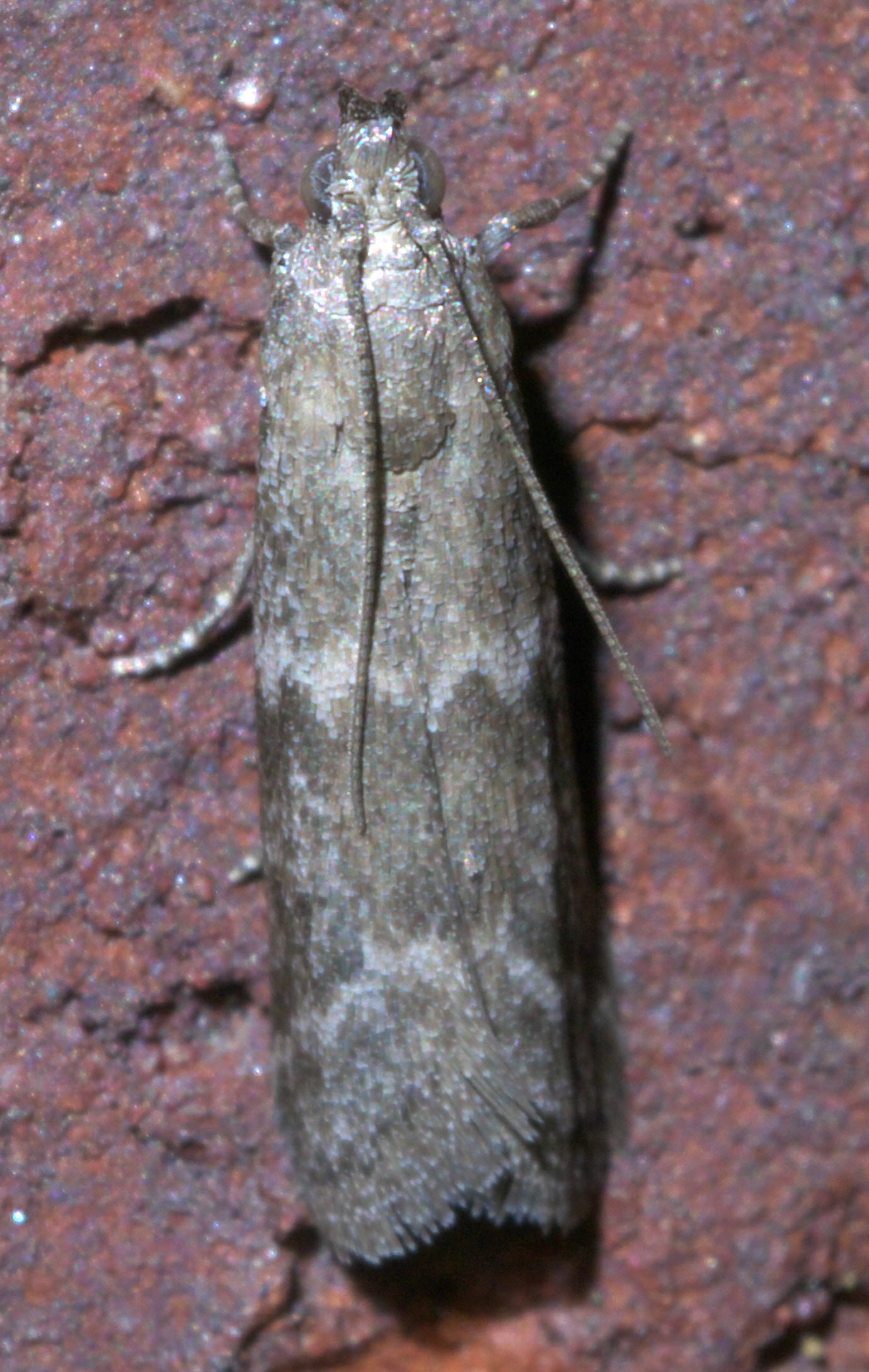
Eurythmia angulella

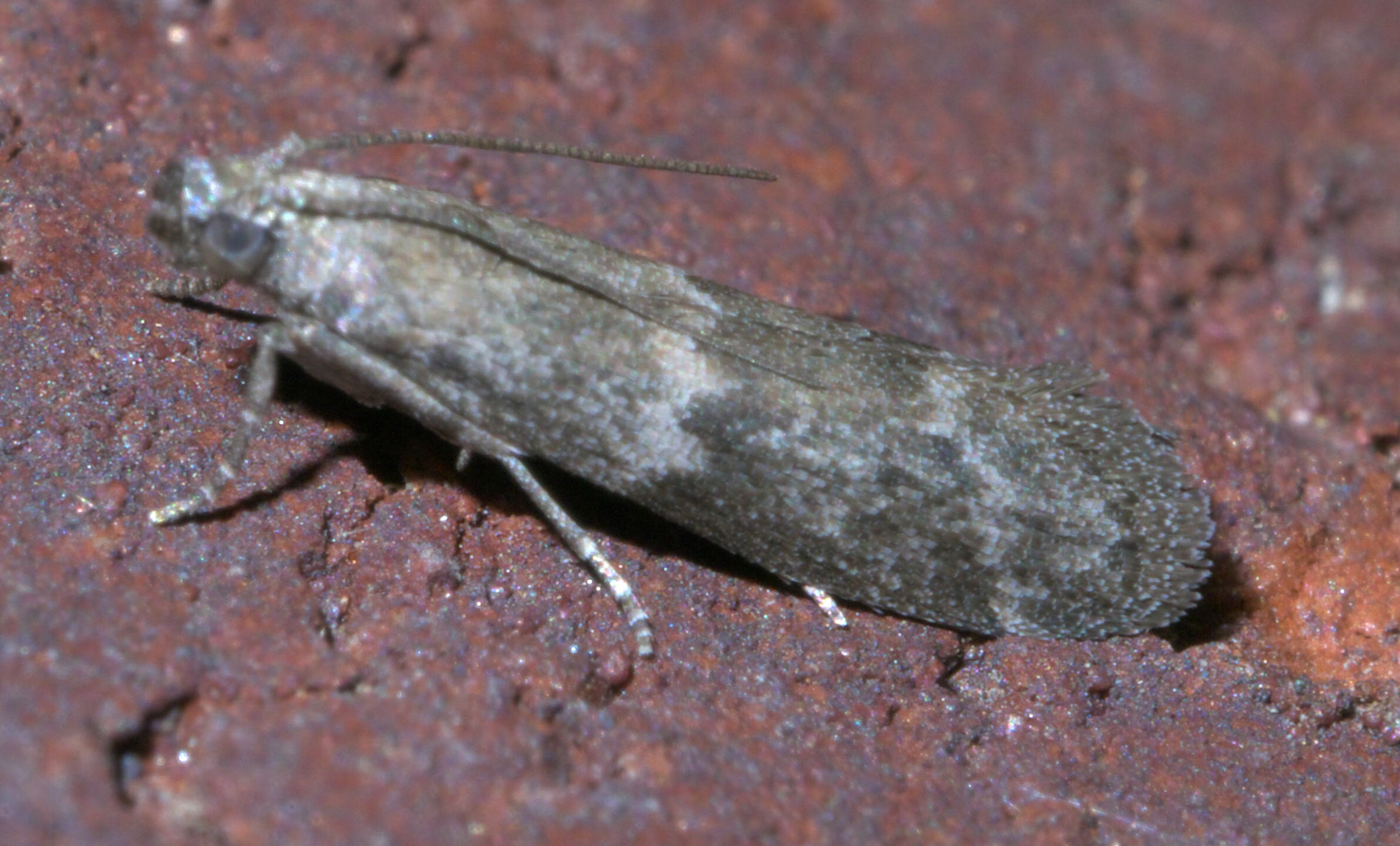
Eurythmia angulella, Size: 7.1 mm

Eurythmia angulella is a species of snout moth belonging to the genus Eurhodope. It was described by Charles Russell Ely in 1910 and is known from North America.
