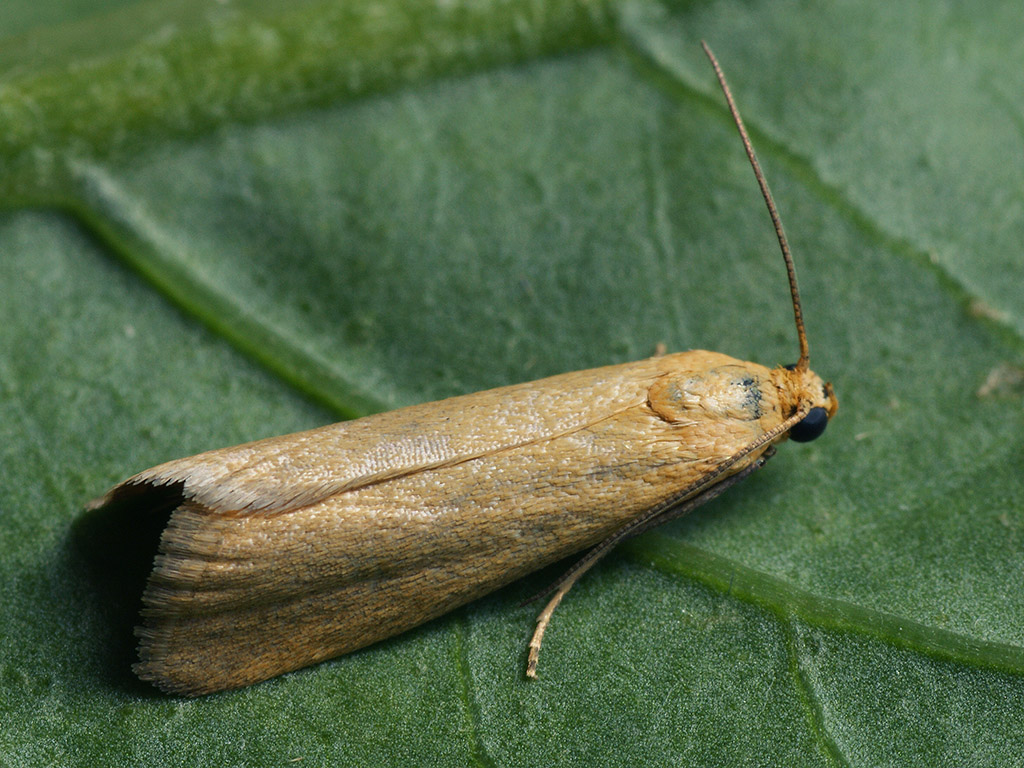
- Exemplar found: Russia, Moscow Oblast, Orekhovo-Zuyevsky District, near village Voinova Gora, 17.07.2017, by light

Scientific classification
- Kingdom: Animalia
- Phylum: Arthropoda
- Clade: Pancrustacea
- Class: Insecta
- Order: Lepidoptera
- Family: Pyralidae
- Genus: Eurhodope
- Species: E. cirrigerella

Binomial name
- Eurhodope cirrigerella (Zincken, 1818)

Synonyms
- Phycis cirrigerella Zincken, 1818; Myelois millierella Ragonot, 1893; Myelois cirrigerella infuscata Staudinger, 1879; Homoeosoma cirrigerella var. luteogrisea Herrich-Schäffer, 1849

= Eurhodope cirrigerella =

Species of moth

Eurhodope cirrigerella is a species of snout moth in the genus Eurhodope. It was described by Johann Leopold Theodor Friedrich Zincken in 1818, and is found in most of Europe. This species was considered extinct from 1960 to 2019.

The average wingspan of the eurhodope cirrigerella is 19–22 mm.

The larvae feed on the flowers of Knautia and Scabiosa species.
