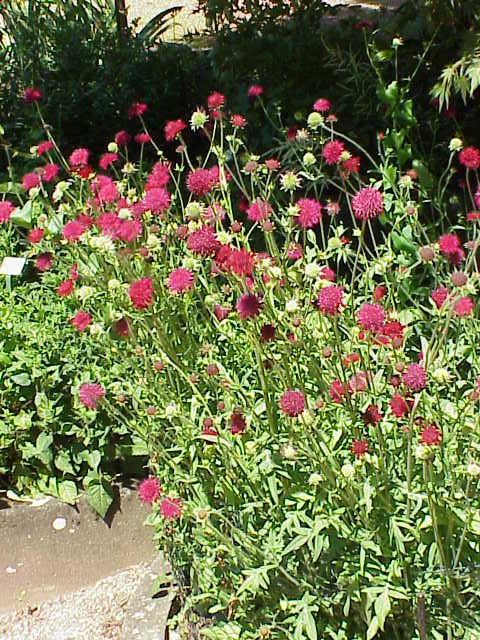

Scientific classification
- Kingdom: Plantae
- Clade: Tracheophytes
- Clade: Angiosperms
- Clade: Eudicots
- Clade: Asterids
- Order: Dipsacales
- Family: Caprifoliaceae
- Genus: Knautia
- Species: K. macedonica

Binomial name
- Knautia macedonica Griseb.

Synonyms
- Knautia macedonica var. indivisa (Vis. & Pančić) J.C.Mayer & Diklić; Scabiosa macedonica (Griseb.) Vis.; Scabiosa macedonica var. indivisa Vis.; Trichera macedonica (Griseb.) Nyman; Knautia atrorubens Janka ex D.Brândză; Knautia lyrophylla (Pančić) Pančić; Knautia macedonica var. lilascens Pančić; Knautia macedonica f. lilascens (Pančić) Borbás; Knautia macedonica var. lyrophylla Pančić; Knautia macedonica f. lyrophylla (Pančić) Borbás; Knautia macedonica var. perpurpurans Borbás; Knautia serbica Formánek; Knautia tulceanensis Nyár.; Scabiosa lyrophylla Vis. & Pančić; Scabiosa macedonica var. lyrophylla (Pančić) Vis. & Pančić; Trichera arvensis f. microcephala Velen.; Trichera arvensis var. purpurea Grecescu; Trichera lyrophylla Nyman; Trichera macedonica var. lyrophylla (Pančić) Nyman

= Knautia macedonica =

Species of flowering plant

Knautia macedonica, the Macedonian scabious, is a species of flowering plant in the family Caprifoliaceae. It is native to Southeastern Europe: Albania, Bulgaria, Greece, North Macedonia, southeastern Romania and Kırklareli in Turkey. Growing to 75 cm (30 in), this herbaceous perennial produces rich red "pincushion" flowers, similar to those of its close relative scabious (Scabiosa), on slender upright stems throughout summer.

Knautia macedonica is cultivated as an ornamental plant. It is extremely hardy, down to −20 °C (−4 °F) and below, but requires a sunny position in neutral or alkaline soil. Though it may be short-lived, it self-seeds readily.

== Description ==
Knautia macedonica is a flowering plant distinguished by its evenly distributed leaves along the stem, with the basal leaves typically withered by the time the plant flowers. The plant features undivided leaves, with the stem leaves (cauline leaves) having an ovate, crenate-serrate terminal lobe—meaning the leaf ends have an egg-shaped tip with rounded teeth along the edges.

One of the most striking features of K. macedonica is its flower heads (capitula), which measure between 1.5 and 3 cm in diameter. The flowers typically display a deep, dark red colour, although lilac and pink variants can also occur. This colour variation is often found within the same population and may result from natural hybridization with related species such as Knautia arvensis and Knautia ambigua. The plant has a chromosome count of 2n=20.

Knautia macedonica typically grows in scrubland and open woodland habitats. A biennial variant with broader-based stem leaves from southeastern Romania has been classified as Knautia tulceanensis.

== Habitat and Distribution ==
Knautia macedonica is native to the Balkan Peninsula, where it naturally occurs in scrubland and open forest habitats. While indigenous to southeastern Europe, this ornamental plant has begun to expand its range through human cultivation and subsequent naturalization.

In Slovakia, K. macedonica has become a popular garden ornamental. Observations have documented the first evidence of its spontaneous spread beyond cultivation in Slovak territory. The species was initially observed in village intravilans (built-up areas), suggesting that neighbouring private gardens served as the source of dispersal. Research on the invasive potential of perennial plantations demonstrated the plant's capacity to spread readily into surrounding areas. These findings confirm the plant's ability to escape cultivation and establish itself in native habitats. Similar patterns of naturalization have been observed in the Czech Republic, where K. macedonica was first recorded as a non-native species in 2018.

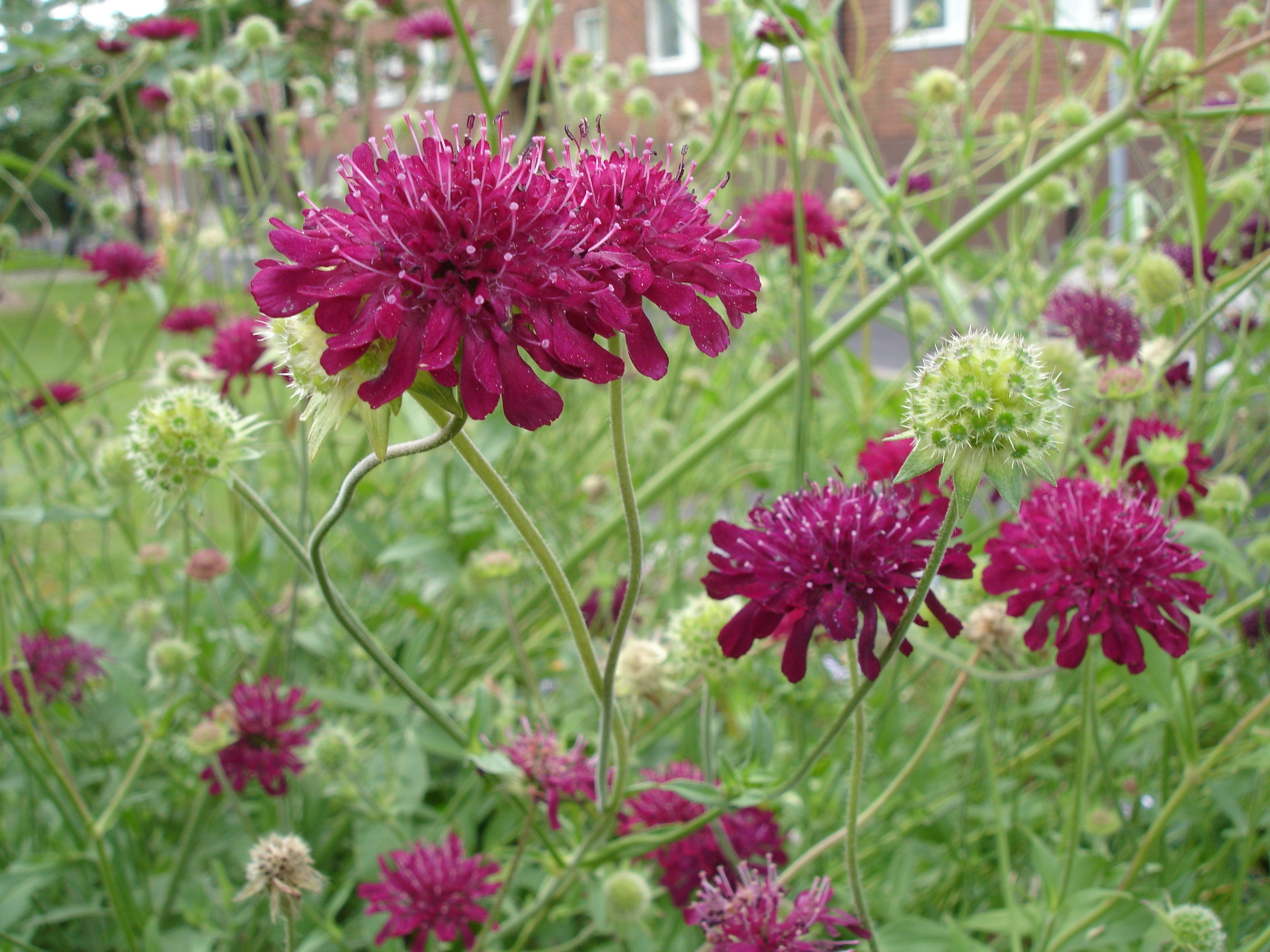

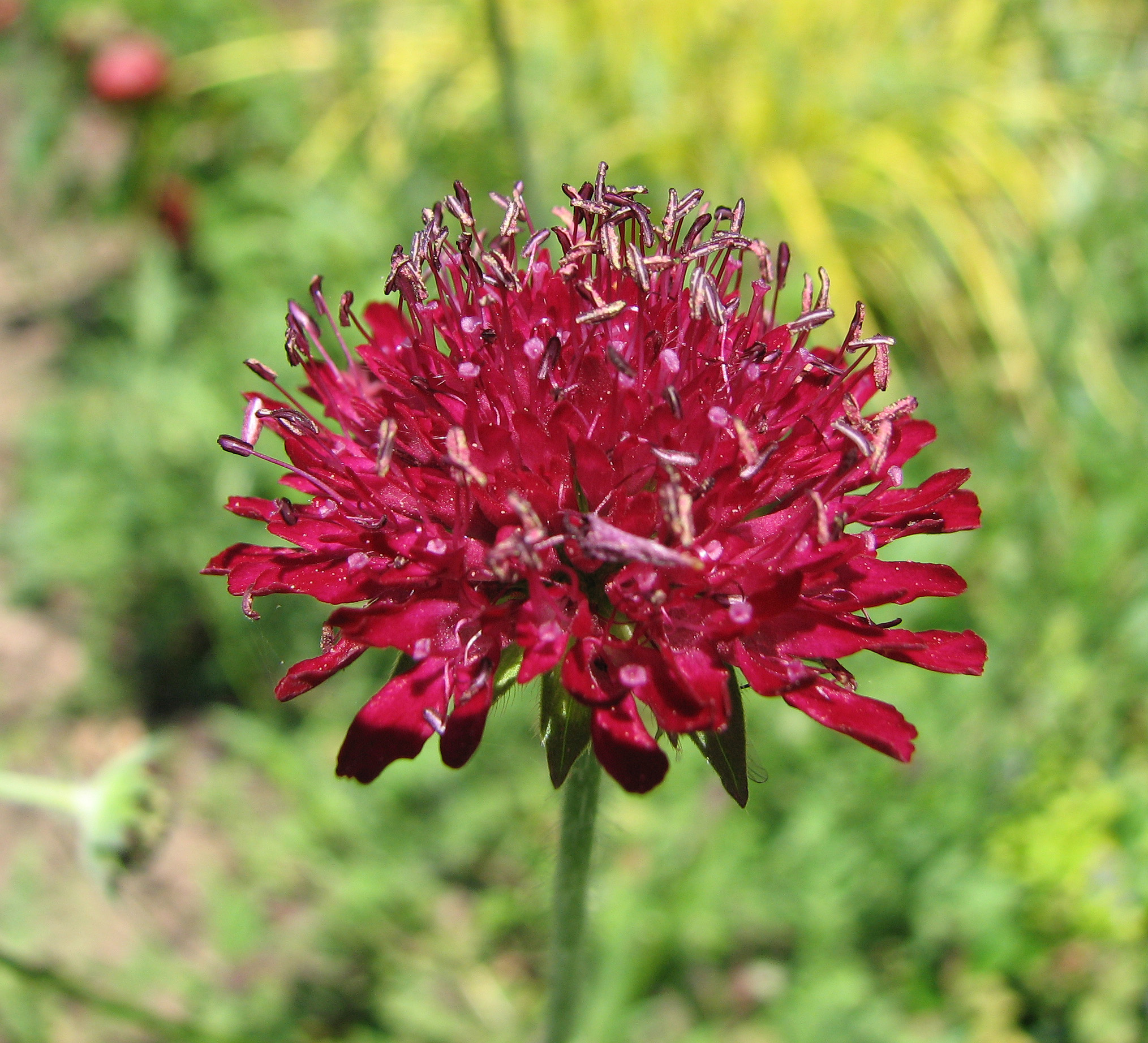
