= Eurythmia fumella =

Scientific classification
- Domain: Eukaryota
- Kingdom: Animalia
- Phylum: Arthropoda
- Class: Insecta
- Order: Lepidoptera
- Family: Pyralidae
- Genus: Eurythmia
- Species: E. fumella

Binomial name
- Eurythmia fumella Ely, 1910

Species of moth

Eurythmia fumella is a species of snout moth in the genus Eurhodope. It was described by Charles Russell Ely in 1910 and is known from North America, including Illinois.
