= Eurhodope cinerea =

Scientific classification
- Domain: Eukaryota
- Kingdom: Animalia
- Phylum: Arthropoda
- Class: Insecta
- Order: Lepidoptera
- Family: Pyralidae
- Genus: Eurhodope
- Species: E. cinerea

Binomial name
- Eurhodope cinerea (Staudinger, 1879)

Synonyms
- Myelois cinerea Staudinger, 1879

Species of moth

Eurhodope cinerea is a species of snout moth in the genus Eurhodope. It was described by Staudinger in 1879, and is known from Cyprus and Lebanon.
