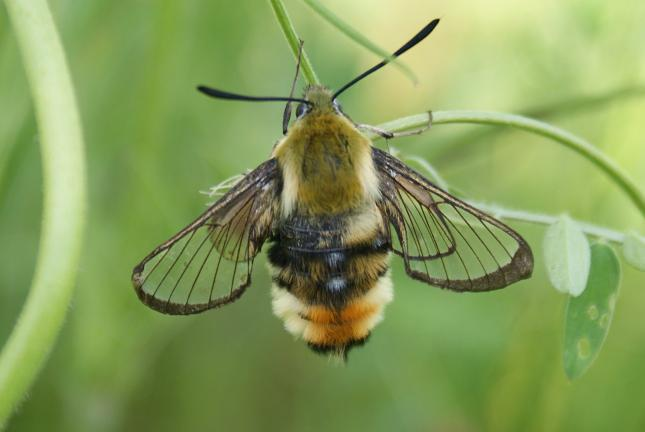

Conservation status
- Least Concern (IUCN 3.1) (Europe regional assessment)

Scientific classification
- Kingdom: Animalia
- Phylum: Arthropoda
- Clade: Pancrustacea
- Class: Insecta
- Order: Lepidoptera
- Family: Sphingidae
- Genus: Hemaris
- Species: H. tityus

Binomial name
- Hemaris tityus (Linnaeus, 1758)

Synonyms
- Sphinx tityus Linnaeus, 1758; Sphinx musca Retzius, 1783; Sphinx bombyliformis Linnaeus, 1758; Macroglossa scabiosae Zeller, 1869; Macroglossa knautiae Zeller, 1869; Hemaris tityus reducta Closs, 1917; Hemaris tityus karaugomica Wojtusiak & Niesiolowski, 1946; Hemaris tityus flavescens Cockayne, 1953; Haemorrhagia tityus ferrugineus Stephan, 1924

= Hemaris tityus =

Narrow-bordered bee hawk-moth

Species of moth

Hemaris tityus, the narrow-bordered bee hawk-moth, is a moth of the family Sphingidae which is native to the Palearctic.

== Range ==
It has a wide range, from Ireland across temperate Europe to the Ural Mountains, western Siberia, Novosibirsk and the Altai. It is also known from the Tian Shan eastwards across Mongolia to north-eastern China and southwards to Tibet. There is a separate population found from Turkey to northern Iran.

== Biology ==
It appears in May and June and is a lively day-flier (unlike most other sphingids), generally active from mid-morning to mid-afternoon. It frequents marshy woodland and damp moorland, and has a wide distribution across temperate Europe and Western Asia, but is generally quite scarce. The larvae feed on devil's-bit scabious (Succisa pratensis) and field scabious (Knautia arvensis).

== Identification ==
It is distinguished from H. fuciformis by the narrow band of scaling along the outer wing margin, and the forewing's undivided discal cell. It has a wingspan of 40–50 millimetres (1.6–2.0 in). It is one of two similar species of sphingid moth occurring in Britain that closely mimic a bumblebee.

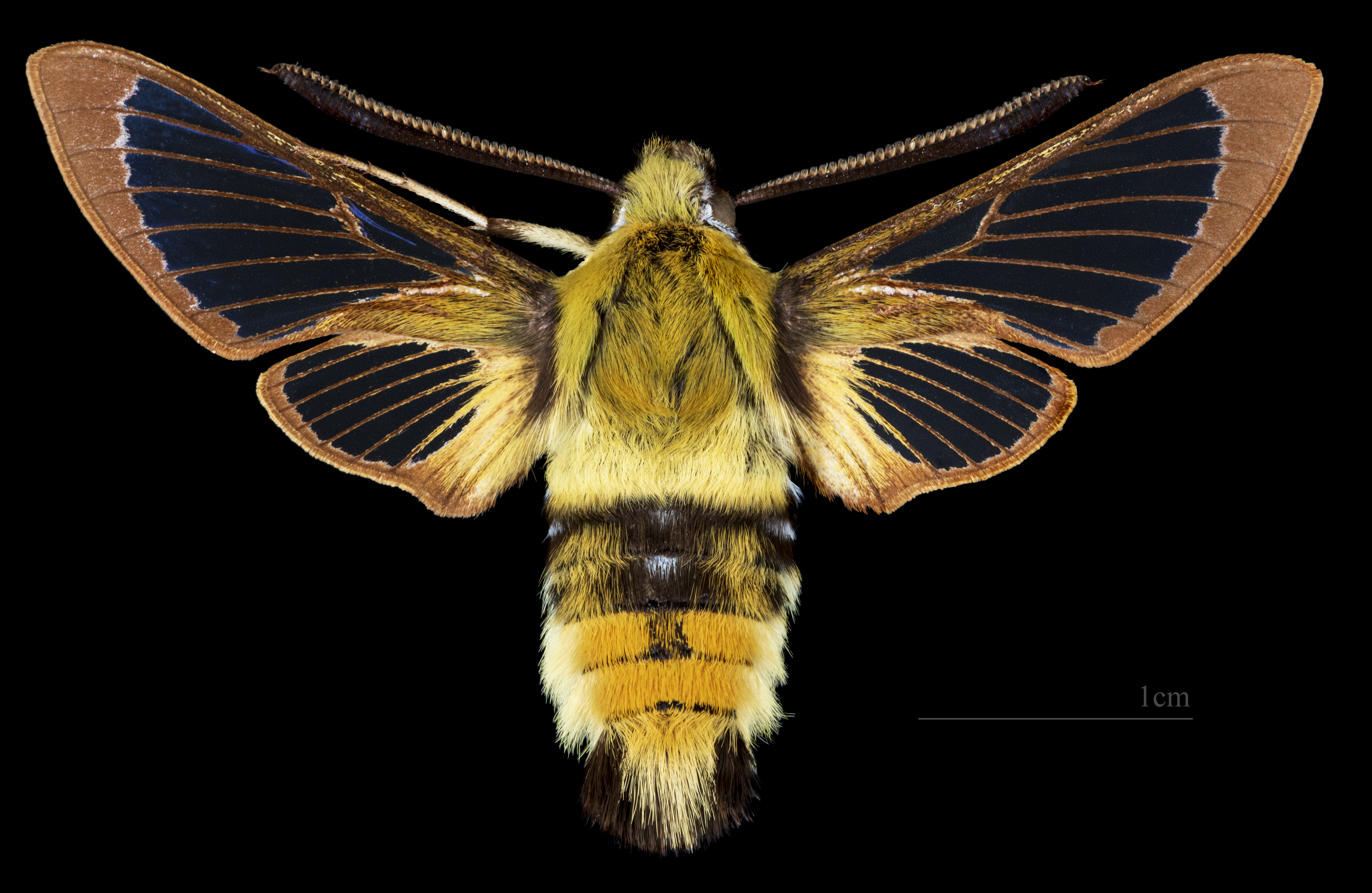
Hemaris tityus ♂

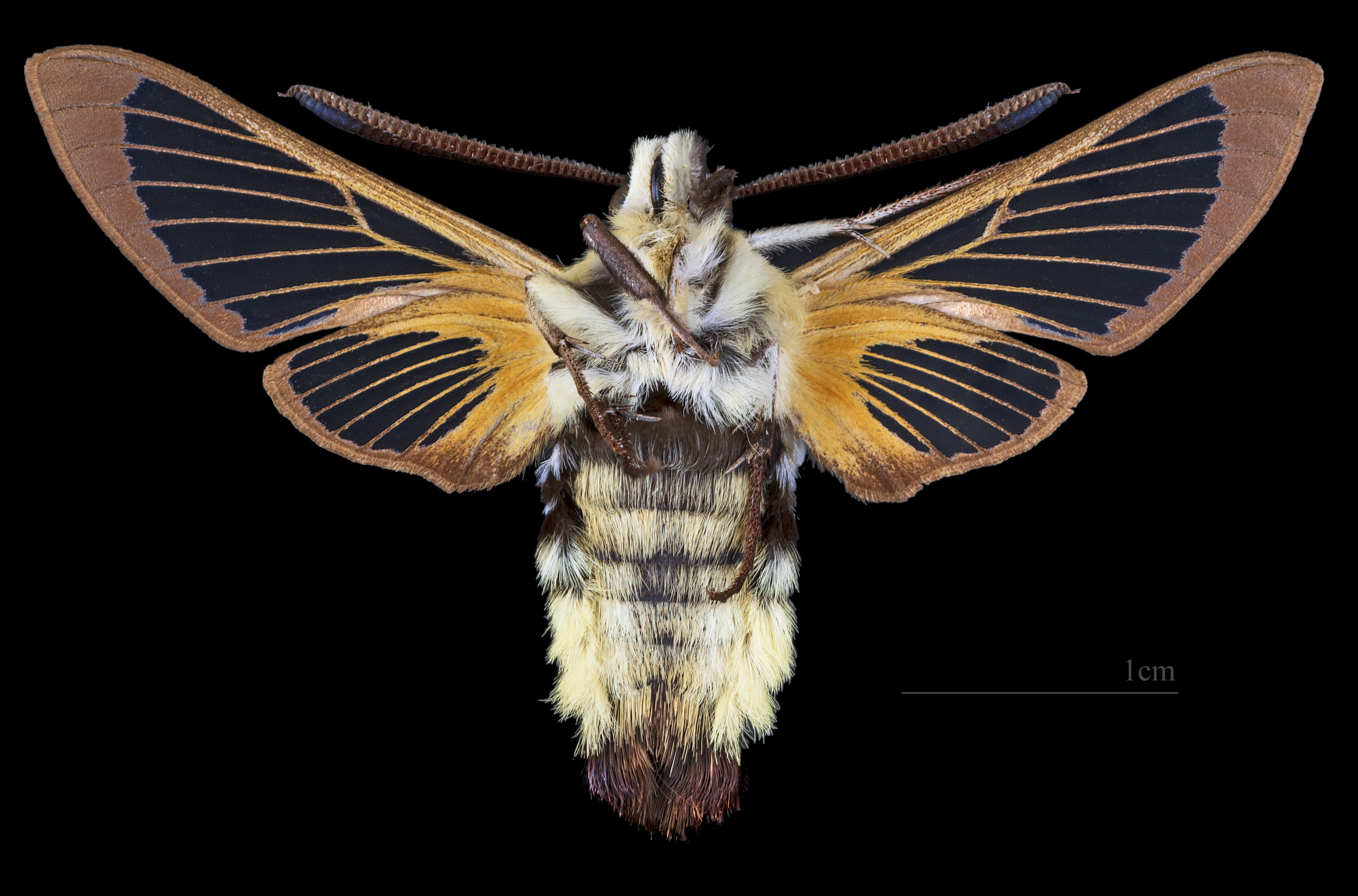
Hemaris tityus ♂ △

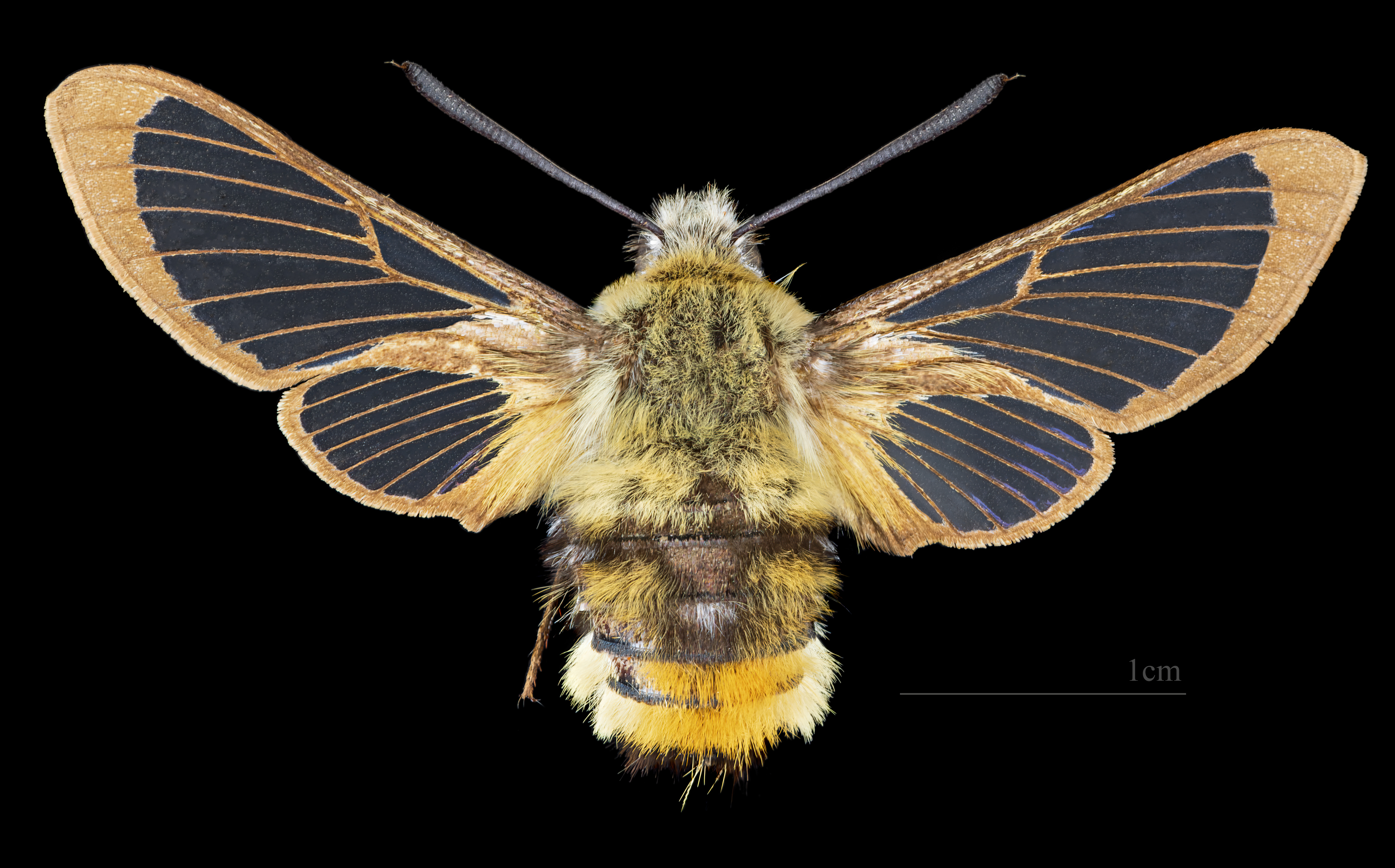
Hemaris tityus ♀

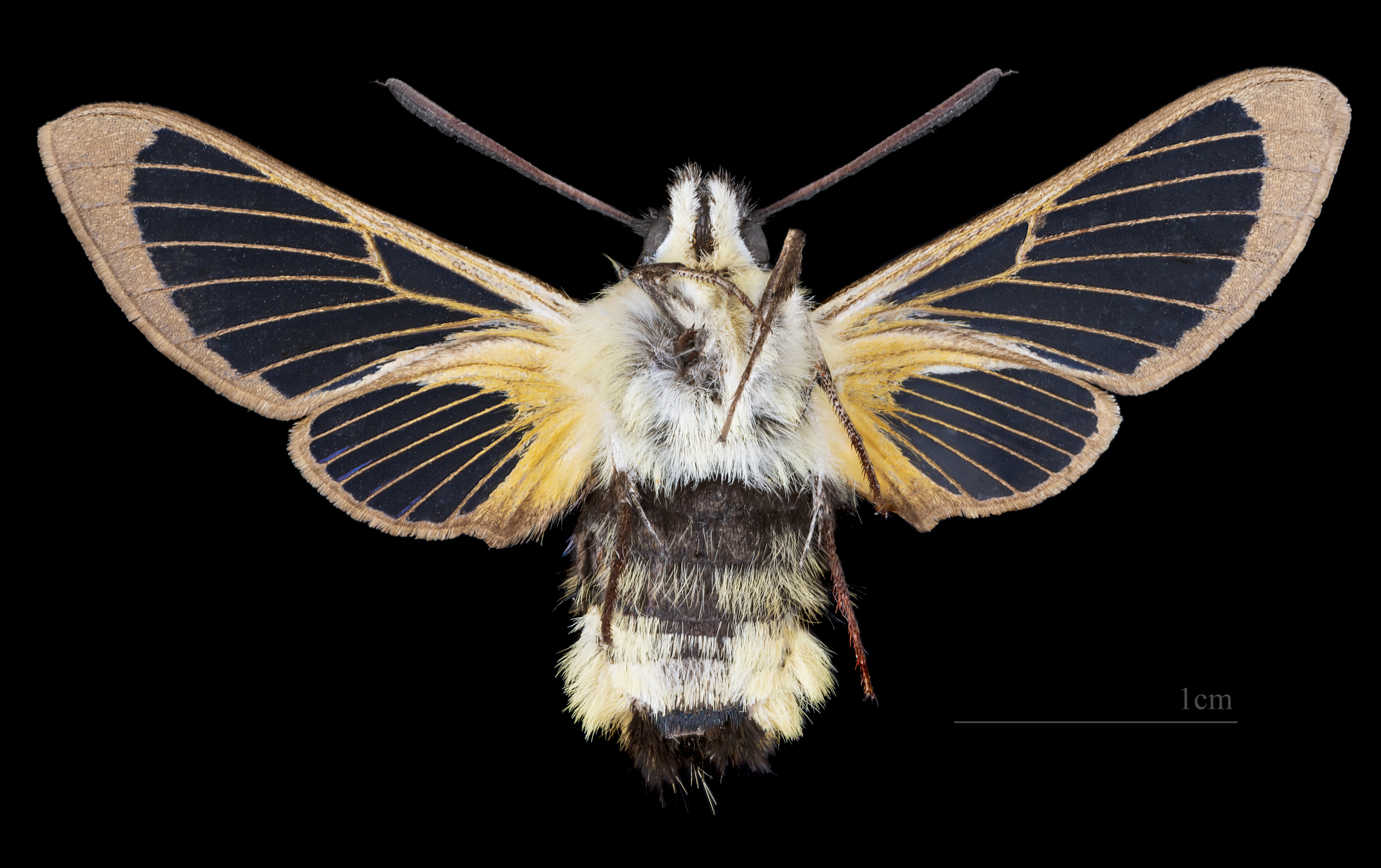
Hemaris tityus ♀ △

== Pictures ==
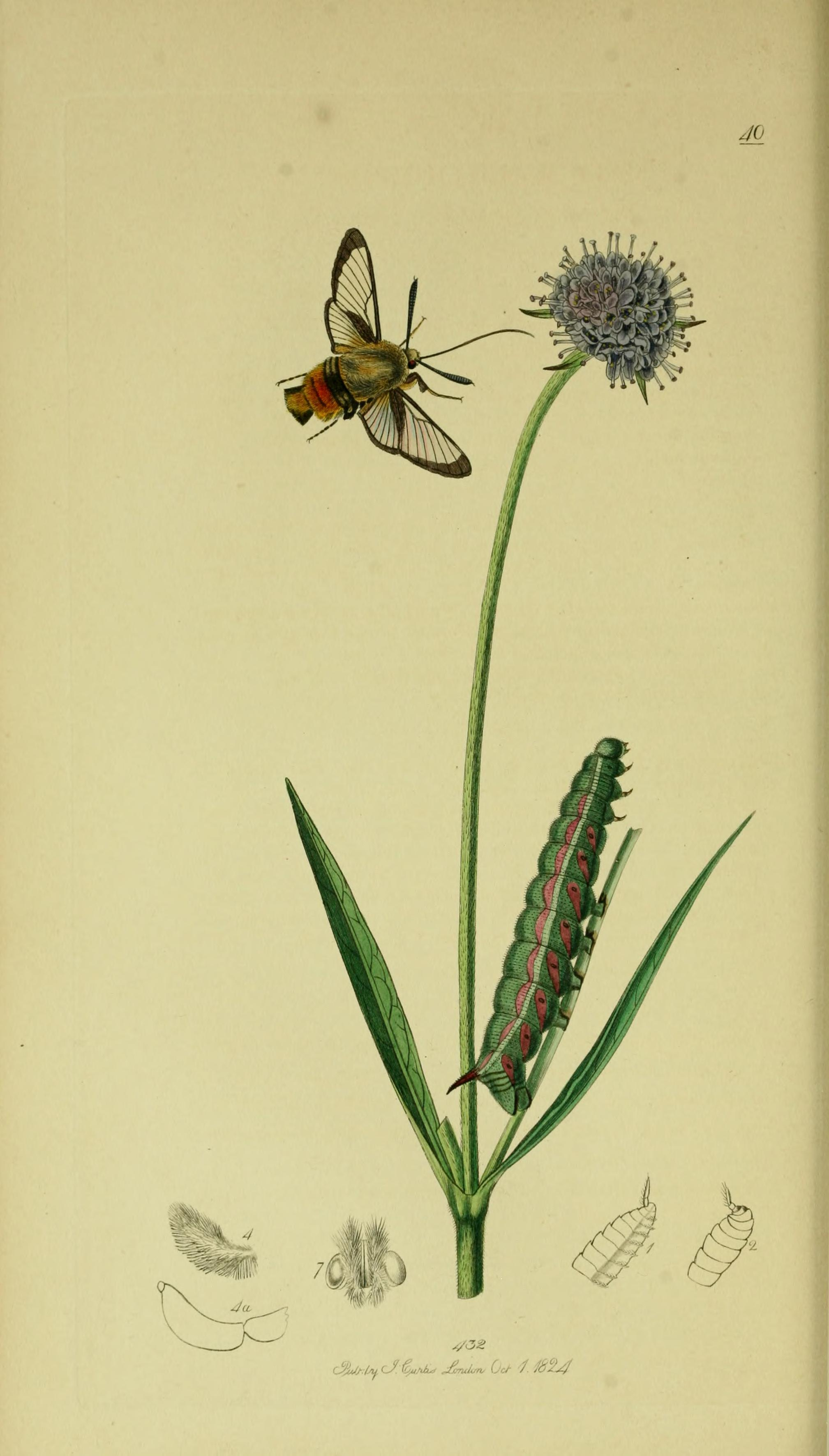
Caterpillar and adult in John Curtis's British Entomology, Volume 5

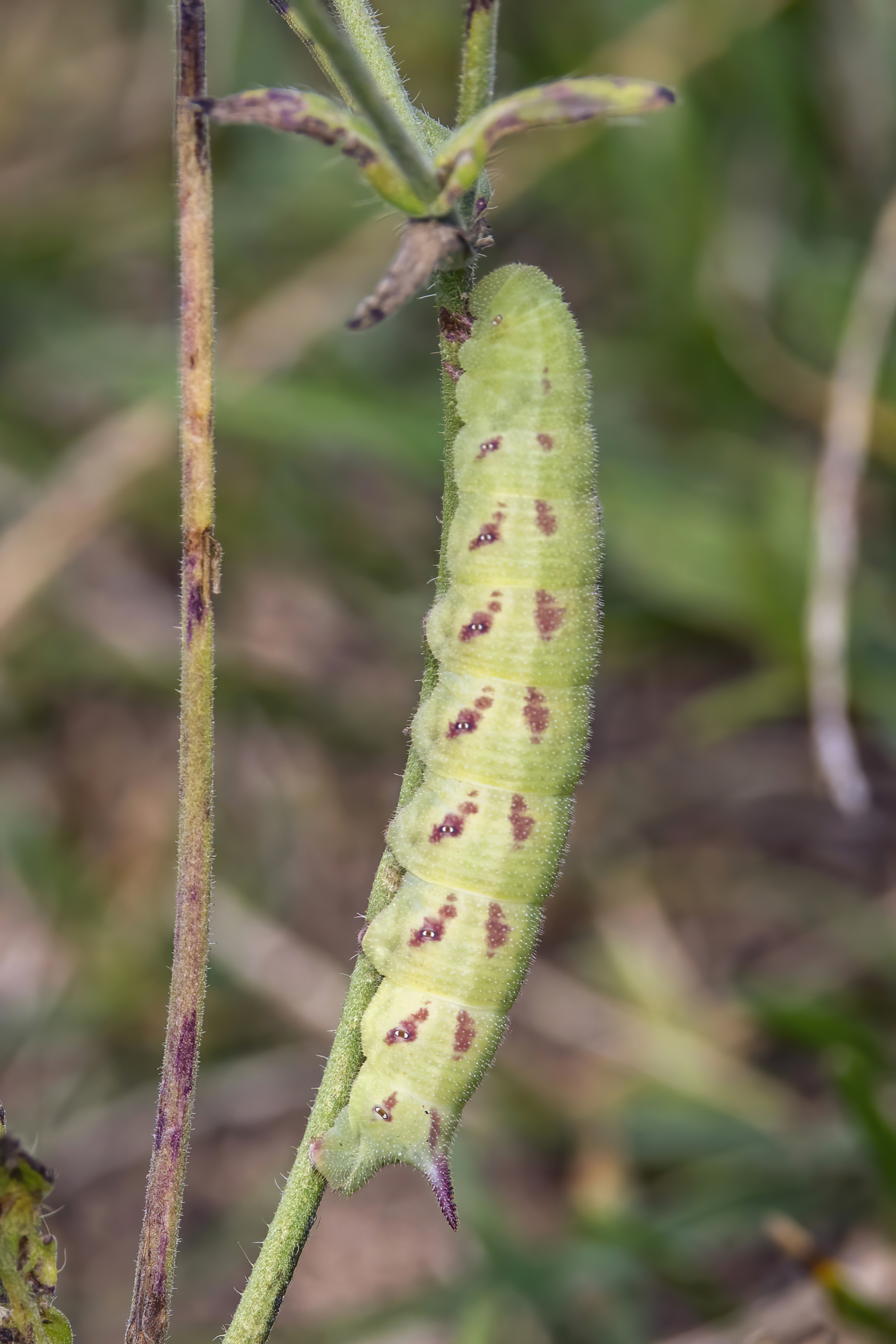
caterpillar, Romania

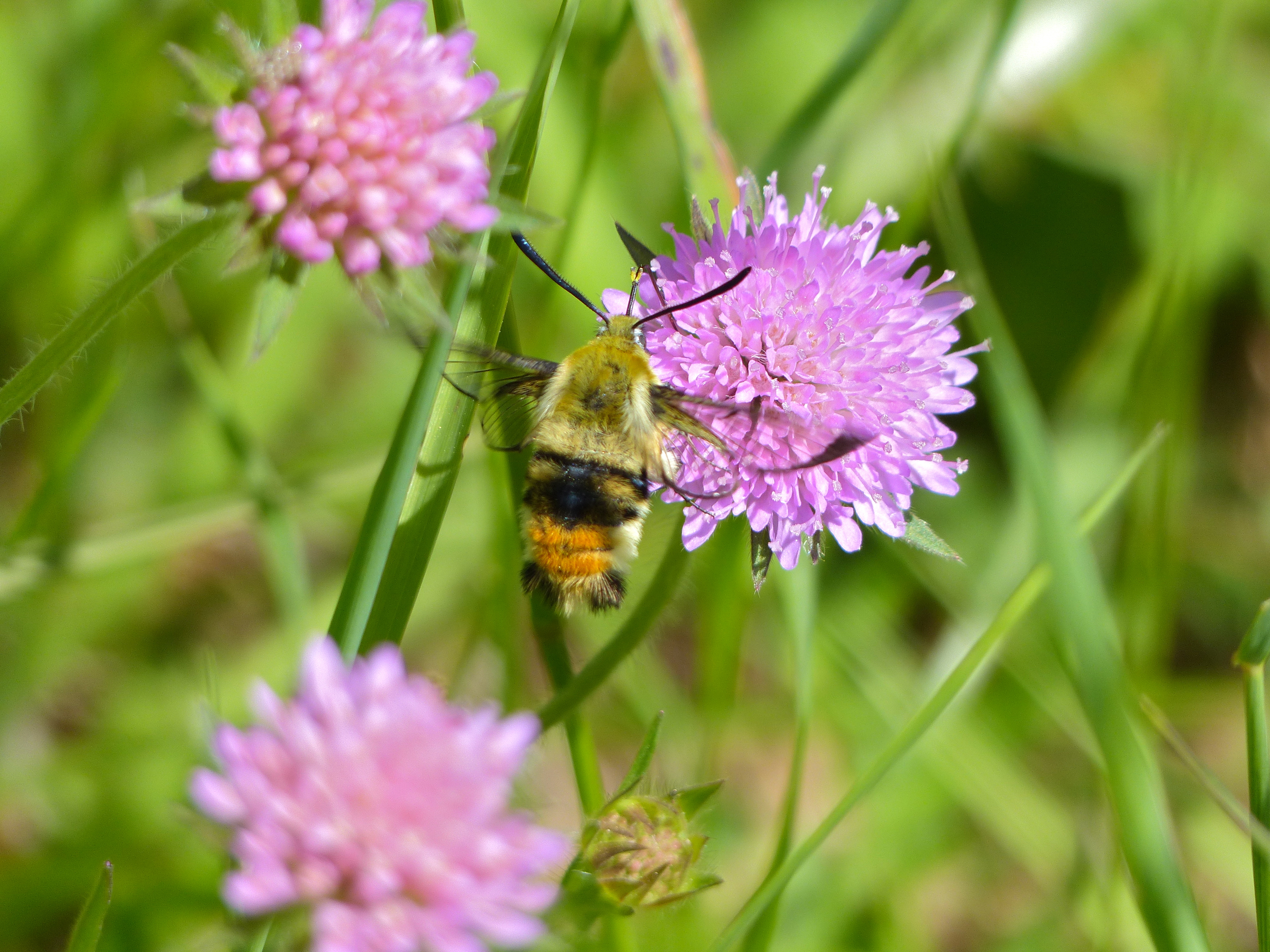
Adult feeding

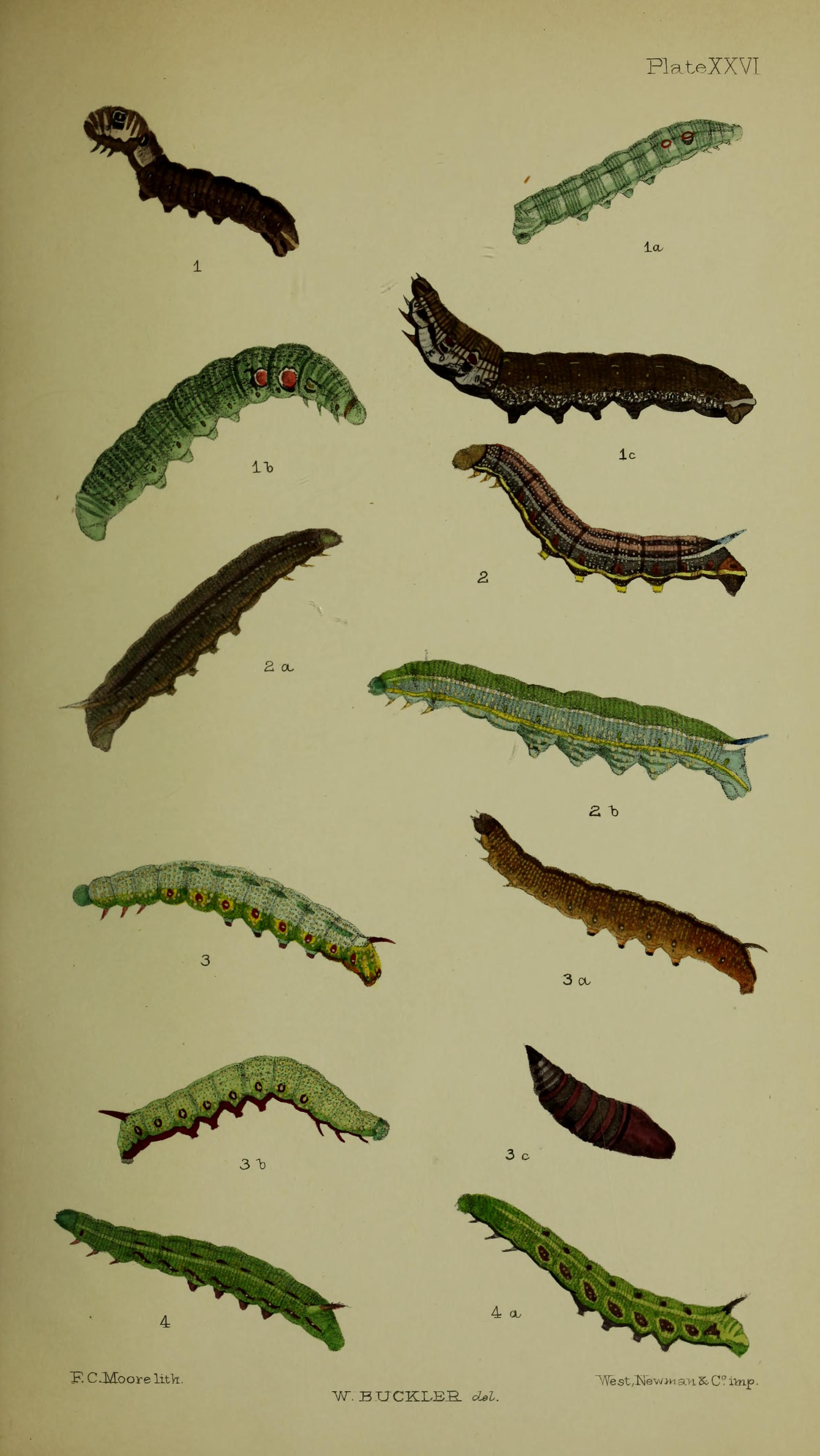
Figs. 4, 4a larvae after last moult
