= Eurhodope confusella =

Scientific classification
- Kingdom: Animalia
- Phylum: Arthropoda
- Class: Insecta
- Order: Lepidoptera
- Family: Pyralidae
- Genus: Eurhodope
- Species: E. confusella

Binomial name
- Eurhodope confusella (Walker, 1866)

Synonyms
- Rhodophaea confusella Walker, 1866

Species of moth

Eurhodope confusella is a species of snout moth in the genus Eurhodope. It was described by Francis Walker in 1866. It is found in South Africa.
