= Eurythmia hospitella =

Scientific classification
- Kingdom: Animalia
- Phylum: Arthropoda
- Clade: Pancrustacea
- Class: Insecta
- Order: Lepidoptera
- Family: Pyralidae
- Genus: Eurythmia
- Species: E. hospitella

Binomial name
- Eurythmia hospitella (Zeller, 1875)

Synonyms
- Ephestia hospitella Zeller, 1875; Eurythmia spaldingella Dyar, 1905

Species of moth

Eurythmia hospitella is a species of snout moth in the genus Eurhodope. It was described by Zeller in 1875. It has been recorded from Arizona, Florida, Alabama, South Carolina and Illinois.
