= Eurhodope notulella =

Scientific classification
- Domain: Eukaryota
- Kingdom: Animalia
- Phylum: Arthropoda
- Class: Insecta
- Order: Lepidoptera
- Family: Pyralidae
- Genus: Eurhodope
- Species: E. notulella

Binomial name
- Eurhodope notulella (Ragonot, 1888)

Synonyms
- Rhodophaea notulella Ragonot, 1888

Species of moth

Eurhodope notulella is a species of snout moth in the genus Eurhodope. It was described by Émile Louis Ragonot in 1888. It is found in South Africa.
