= Eurhodope incompta =

Scientific classification
- Kingdom: Animalia
- Phylum: Arthropoda
- Clade: Pancrustacea
- Class: Insecta
- Order: Lepidoptera
- Family: Pyralidae
- Genus: Eurhodope
- Species: E. incompta

Binomial name
- Eurhodope incompta (Zeller, 1847)

Synonyms
- Myelois incompta Zeller, 1847; Eurhodope sielmannella Roesler, 1969

Species of moth

Eurhodope incompta is a species of snout moth in the genus Eurhodope. It was described by Zeller in 1847, and is known from Greece, Crete, North Macedonia and Turkey.
