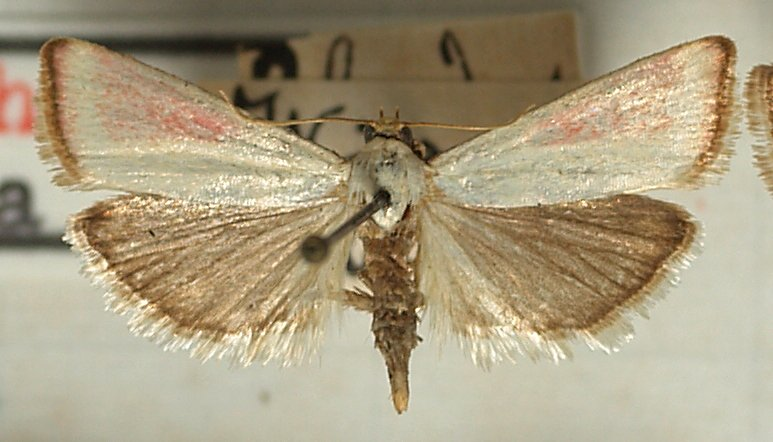

Scientific classification
- Domain: Eukaryota
- Kingdom: Animalia
- Phylum: Arthropoda
- Class: Insecta
- Order: Lepidoptera
- Family: Pyralidae
- Genus: Eurhodope
- Species: E. rosella

Binomial name
- Eurhodope rosella (Scopoli, 1763)

Synonyms
- Phalaena rosella Scopoli, 1763; Pyralis pudoralis Denis & Schiffermüller 1775; Tinea pudorella Hübner, 1796; Tortrix pudorana Frölich, 1828

= Eurhodope rosella =

Species of moth

Eurhodope rosella is a moth of the family Pyralidae. It is found in southern and central Europe.

The wingspan is 15–20 mm.

The larva feeds on Scabiosa columbaria.
