= Eurhodope nyctosia =

Scientific classification
- Domain: Eukaryota
- Kingdom: Animalia
- Phylum: Arthropoda
- Class: Insecta
- Order: Lepidoptera
- Family: Pyralidae
- Genus: Eurhodope
- Species: E. nyctosia

Binomial name
- Eurhodope nyctosia Balinsky, 1991

Species of moth

Eurhodope nyctosia is a species of snout moth in the genus Eurhodope. It was described by Boris Balinsky in 1991 and is known from South Africa.
