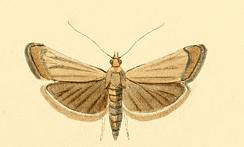

Scientific classification
- Kingdom: Animalia
- Phylum: Arthropoda
- Clade: Pancrustacea
- Class: Insecta
- Order: Lepidoptera
- Family: Pyralidae
- Genus: Eurhodope
- Species: E. monogrammos

Binomial name
- Eurhodope monogrammos (Zeller, 1867)

Synonyms
- Myelois monogrammos Zeller, 1867

= Eurhodope monogrammos =

Species of moth

Eurhodope monogrammos is a species of snout moth in the genus Eurhodope. It was described by Zeller in 1867. It is found in Bulgaria, Albania and Turkey.
