= Eurhodope infixella =

Scientific classification
- Kingdom: Animalia
- Phylum: Arthropoda
- Class: Insecta
- Order: Lepidoptera
- Family: Pyralidae
- Genus: Eurhodope
- Species: E. infixella

Binomial name
- Eurhodope infixella (Walker, 1866)

Synonyms
- Rhodophaea infixella Walker, 1866

Species of moth

Eurhodope infixella is a species of snout moth in the genus Eurhodope. It was described by Francis Walker in 1866. It is found in South Africa.
