= Eurhodope incensella =

Scientific classification
- Domain: Eukaryota
- Kingdom: Animalia
- Phylum: Arthropoda
- Class: Insecta
- Order: Lepidoptera
- Family: Pyralidae
- Genus: Eurhodope
- Species: E. incensella

Binomial name
- Eurhodope incensella (Staudinger, 1859)

Synonyms
- Myelois incensella Staudinger, 1859; Eurhodope flavella Amsel, 1954

Species of moth

Eurhodope incensella is a species of snout moth in the genus Eurhodope. It was described by Staudinger in 1859. It is found in Spain and North Africa.
