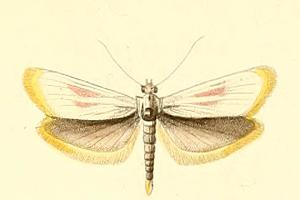

Scientific classification
- Domain: Eukaryota
- Kingdom: Animalia
- Phylum: Arthropoda
- Class: Insecta
- Order: Lepidoptera
- Family: Pyralidae
- Genus: Eurhodope
- Species: E. cruentella

Binomial name
- Eurhodope cruentella (Duponchel, 1842)

Synonyms
- Ilithyia cruentella Duponchel, 1842

= Eurhodope cruentella =

Species of moth

Eurhodope cruentella is a species of snout moth in the genus Eurhodope. It was described by Philogène Auguste Joseph Duponchel in 1842. It is found in Spain and France.
