= Eurythmia =

Scientific classification
- Domain: Eukaryota
- Kingdom: Animalia
- Phylum: Arthropoda
- Class: Insecta
- Order: Lepidoptera
- Family: Pyralidae
- Subfamily: Phycitinae
- Genus: Eurythmia; Ragonot, 1887

Genus of moths

Eurythmia is a genus of snout moths. It was described by Émile Louis Ragonot in 1887.

== Species ==
- Eurythmia angulella Ely, 1910
- Eurythmia fumella Ely, 1910
- Eurythmia hospitella Zeller, 1875
- Eurythmia yavapaella Dyar, 1906
