= Floral zone =

Area with similar distributions of plant species

A floral zone is an area with similar distributions of plant species, usually a horizontal belt determined by elevation. In a historic report on plant distribution in the United States, The Death Valley Expedition: A Biological Survey of Parts of California, Nevada, Arizona, and Utah, naturalist Clinton Hart Merriam describes “Most of the desert shrubs are social plants and are distributed in well-marked belts or zones, the vertical limits of which are fixed by the temperature during the period of growth and reproduction.”

A zonal plant is a species or variety which is of value in determining floral zones. Botanist Frederick Vernon Coville defined the expression, describing "the best method of procedure in a new area to establish the (floral) zones by means of a comparatively small number of the best zonal plants, and afterwards to arrange the other less important [plants] in their proper places."

== See also ==
- Altitudinal zonation
- Life zone
