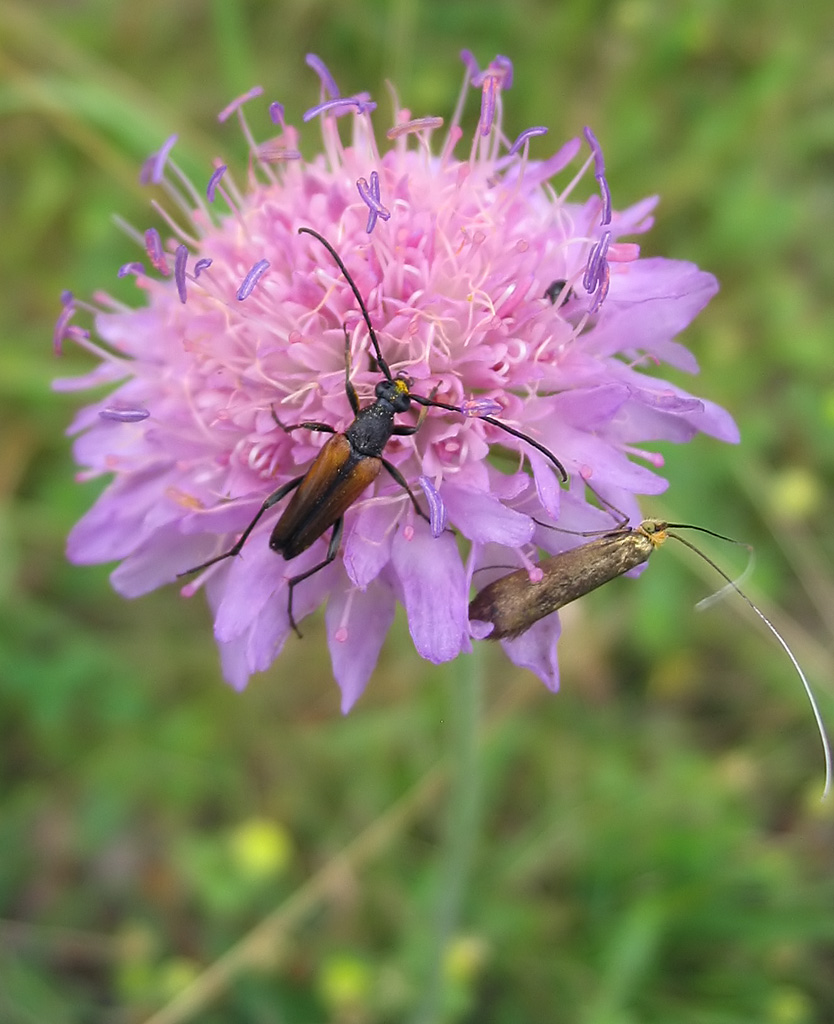
- Knautia arvensis

Scientific classification
- Kingdom: Plantae
- Clade: Embryophytes
- Clade: Tracheophytes
- Clade: Spermatophytes
- Clade: Angiosperms
- Clade: Eudicots
- Clade: Asterids
- Order: Dipsacales
- Family: Caprifoliaceae
- Subfamily: Dipsacoideae
- Genus: Knautia; L.

Species
- 55; see text

Synonyms
- Lychniscabiosa Fabr. (1759), nom. superfl.; Thlasidia Raf. (1838); Trichera Schrad. ex Roem. & Schult. (1818)

= Knautia =

Genus of flowering plants in the honeysuckle family

Knautia is a genus of flowering plants in the family Caprifoliaceae. It includes 55 species native to Europe, North Africa, Western and Central Asia, and Siberia. The common names are variants of "widow flower". Others are given the name "scabious", which properly belongs to the related genus (Scabiosa). The name Knautia comes from the 17th-century German botanists, Drs. Christoph and Christian Knaut.

== Species ==
55 species are accepted.

- Knautia adriatica Ehrend.
- Knautia albanica Briq.
- Knautia × alleizettei Chass. & Szabó
- Knautia ambigua Boiss. & Orph.
- Knautia arvensis (L.) Coult. – Meadow widow flower, blue buttons, field scabious
- Knautia arvernensis (Briq.) Szabó
- Knautia baldensis A.Kern. ex Borbás
- Knautia basaltica Chass. & Szabó
- Knautia byzantina Fritsch
- Knautia calycina (C.Presl) Guss.
- Knautia carinthiaca Ehrend.
- Knautia caroli-rechingeri Micevski
- Knautia × chassagnei Szabó
- Knautia clementii (Beck) Ehrenb.
- Knautia collina (Gaudin) Jord.
- Knautia dalmatica Beck
- Knautia degenii Borbás
- Knautia dinarica (Murb.) Borbás
- Knautia dipsacifolia Kreutzer
- Knautia × dobrogensis Prodan
- Knautia drymeia Heuff. – Hungarian widow flower
- Knautia fleischmannii (Hladnik ex Rchb.) Beck
- Knautia foreziensis Chass. & Szabó
- Knautia godetii Reut.
- Knautia goecmenii Yıldırım
- Knautia gussonei Szabó
- Knautia illyrica Beck
- Knautia integrifolia (Honck. ex L.) Bertol.
- Knautia × intercedens Beck
- Knautia involucrata Sommier & Levier
- Knautia kitaibelii (Schult.) Borbás
- Knautia lebrunii J.Prudhomme
- Knautia legionensis (Lag.) DC.
- Knautia × leucantha Schur
- Knautia longifolia (Waldst. & Kit.) W.D.J.Koch – Long leaf widow flower
- Knautia lucana Lacaita & Szabó
- Knautia macedonica Griseb. – Macedonian scabious
- Knautia magnifica Boiss. & Orph.
- Knautia mauritanica Pomel
- Knautia mollis Jord.
- Knautia nevadensis (M.Winkl. ex Szabó) Szabó
- Knautia × norica Ehrend.
- Knautia numantina (Pau) Devesa, Ortega Oliv. & J.López
- Knautia × oecsemensis Nyár.
- Knautia orientalis L.
- Knautia pancicii Szabó
- Knautia pectinata Ehrend.
- Knautia persicina A.Kern.
- Knautia × posoniensis Degen
- Knautia ressmannii (Pacher) Borbás
- Knautia rupicola (Willk.) Font Quer
- Knautia salvadoris Sennen ex Szabó
- Knautia × sambucifolia (Godet) Briq.
- Knautia sarajevensis (Beck) Szabó
- Knautia shepardii Post & Beauverd
- Knautia slovaca Štěpánek
- Knautia × speciosa Schur
- Knautia subcanescens Jord.
- Knautia subscaposa Boiss. & Reut.
- Knautia tatarica (L.) Szabó
- Knautia transalpina (Christ ex Gremli) Briq.
- Knautia travnicensis (Beck) Szabó
- Knautia × ujhelyii Jáv.
- Knautia velebitica Szabó
- Knautia velutina Briq.
- Knautia visianii Szabó
