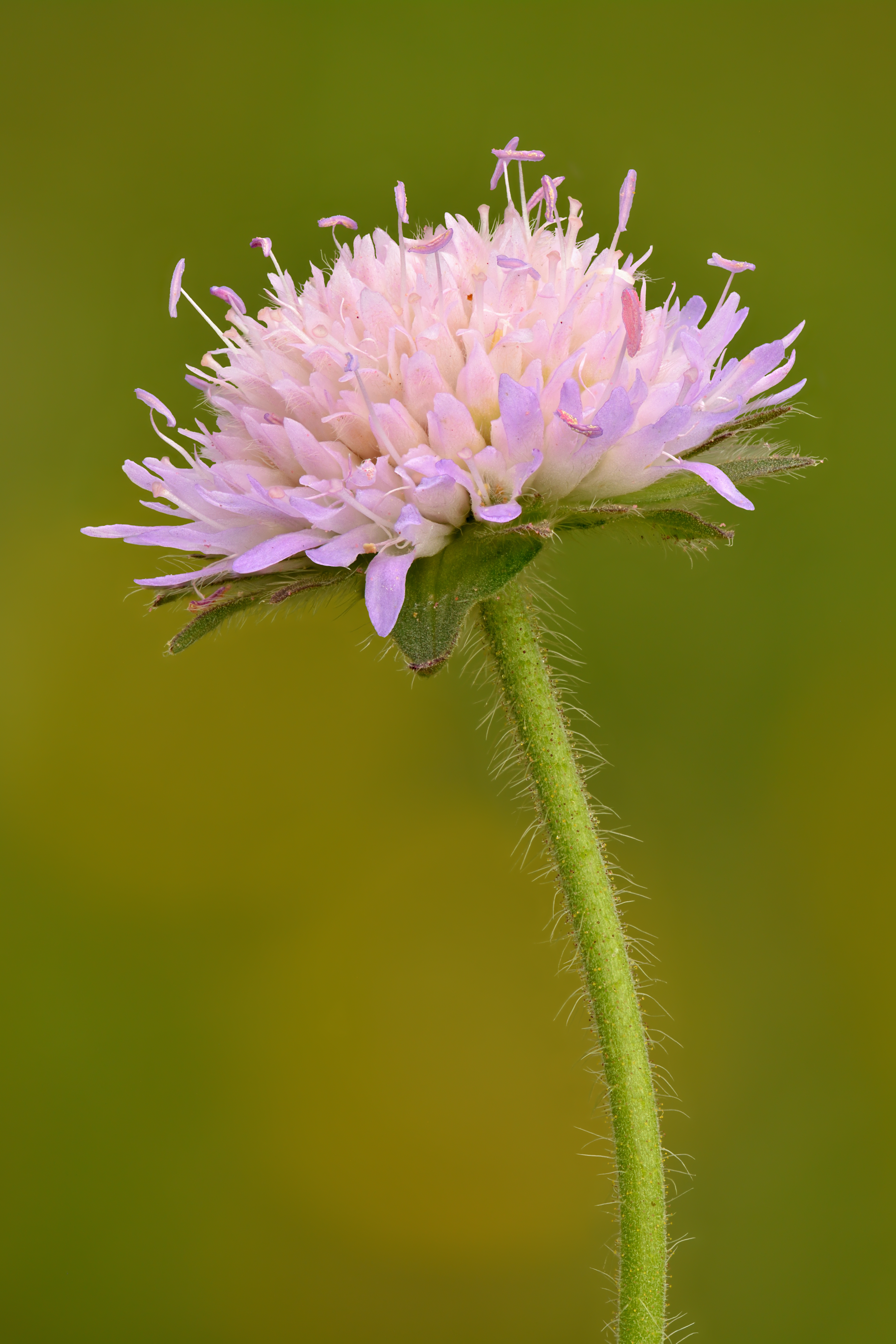

Scientific classification
- Kingdom: Plantae
- Clade: Embryophytes
- Clade: Tracheophytes
- Clade: Angiosperms
- Clade: Eudicots
- Clade: Asterids
- Order: Dipsacales
- Family: Caprifoliaceae
- Genus: Knautia
- Species: K. arvensis

Binomial name
- Knautia arvensis (L.) Coult.

= Knautia arvensis =

Species of flowering plant in the honeysuckle family

Knautia arvensis, commonly known as field scabious, is a herbaceous perennial species of flowering plant in the honeysuckle family Caprifoliaceae.

== Description ==
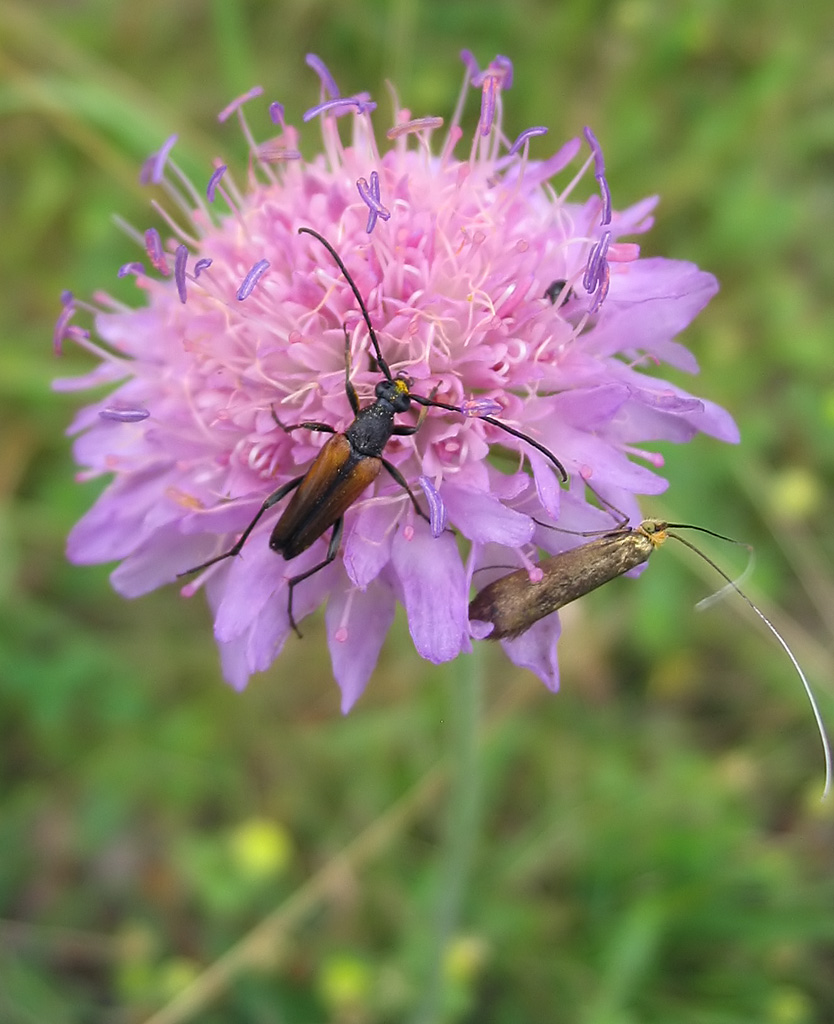
Nectar-rich inflorescence attracts many insects.

It is a perennial plant that grows between 25 and 100 cm (9.8 and 39.4 in). It prefers grassy places and dry soils, avoiding heavy soils, and flowers between May and August. The flowers are borne on inflorescences in the form of heads; each head contains many small florets. The head is flatter than in similar species, such as devil's bit scabious (Succisa pratensis) and small scabious (Scabiosa columbaria). There are 4 stamens in each floret, and 1 notched long stigma. The fruit is nut like, cylindrical and hairy, 5–6 mm (0.20–0.24 in) in size. It has a tap root. The stem has long stiff hairs angled downwards. The leaves form a basal rosette, are paired on the stem, the lowest typically 300 mm (12 in) long, spear shaped, whereas the upper are smaller. There are no stipules.

== Ecology ==
It is occasionally used by the marsh fritillary as a foodplant instead of its usual foodplant of devils bit scabious (Succisa pratensis). It is also the foodplant of the narrow-bordered bee hawk-moth (Hemaris tityus).

== Name ==
Species of scabious were used to treat scabies, and many other afflictions of the skin including sores caused by the bubonic plague. The word scabies comes from the Latin word scabere 'scratch'. Another name for this plant is gipsy rose. The genus Knautia is named after the 17th-century German botanist Christian Knaut.

== Habitat ==
Commonly found on roadsides and field margins, and in meadows, it is particularly abundant where there is chalk bedrock.

== Gallery ==
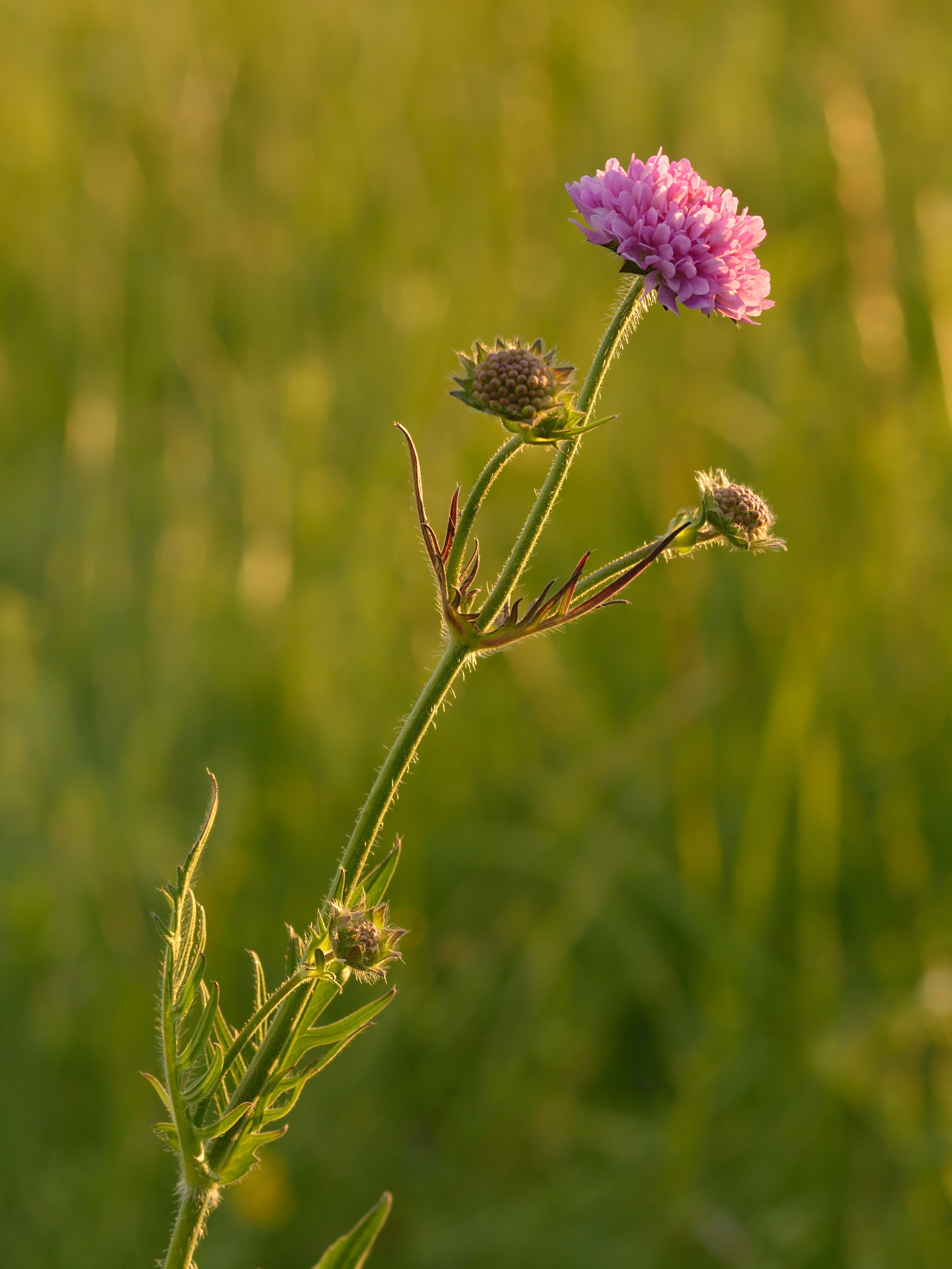

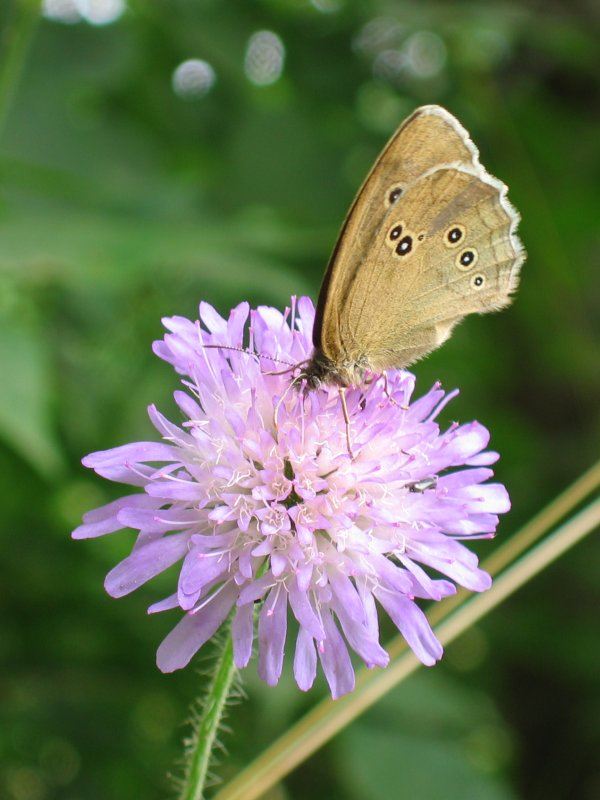
With Aphantopus hyperantus

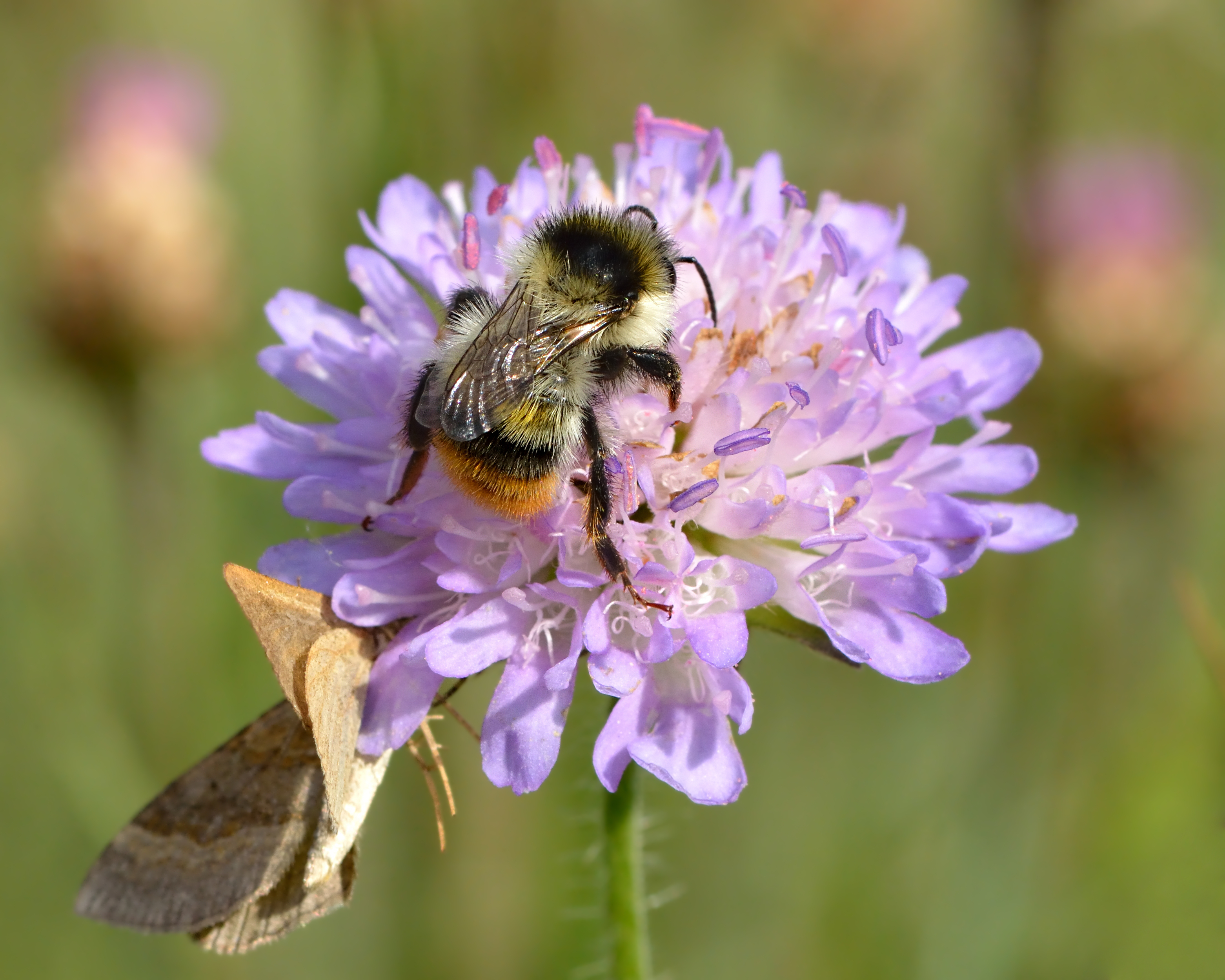

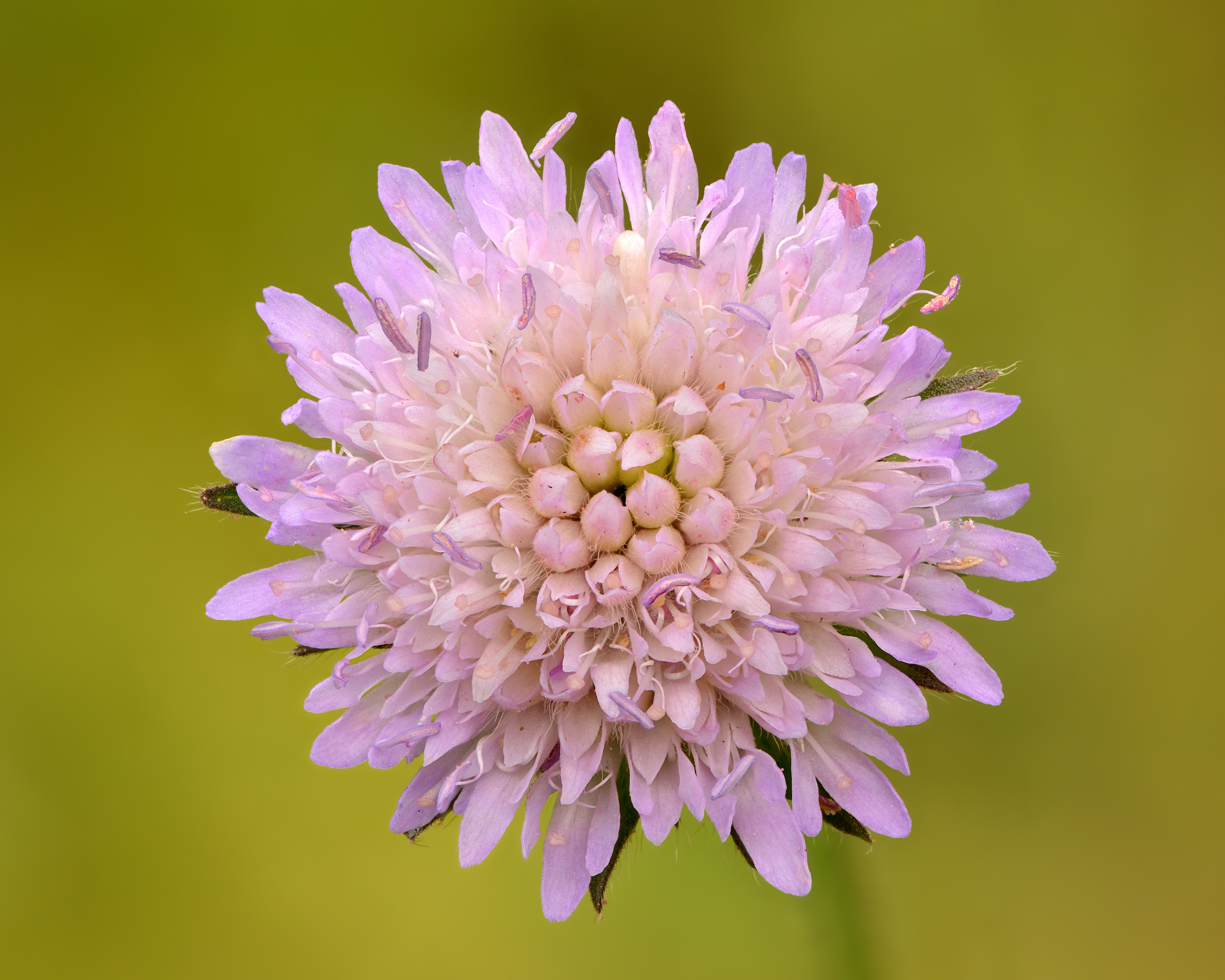

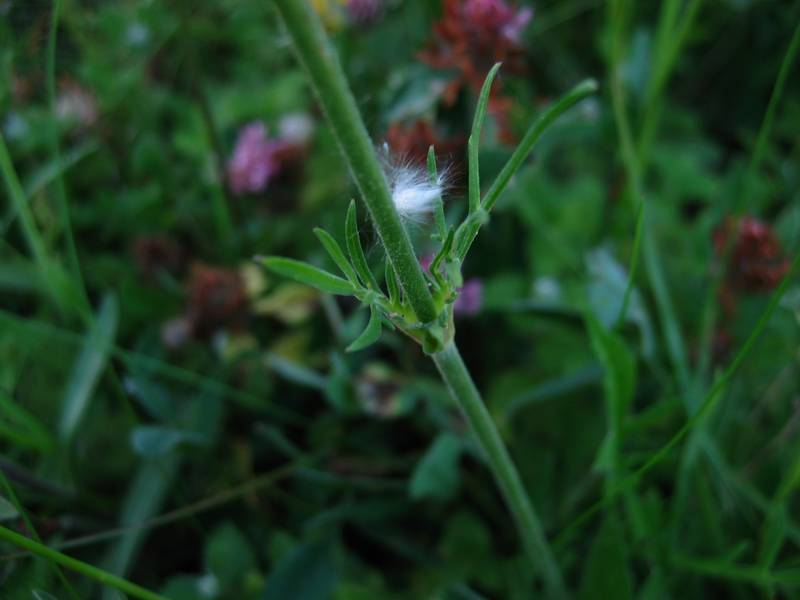
Leaves

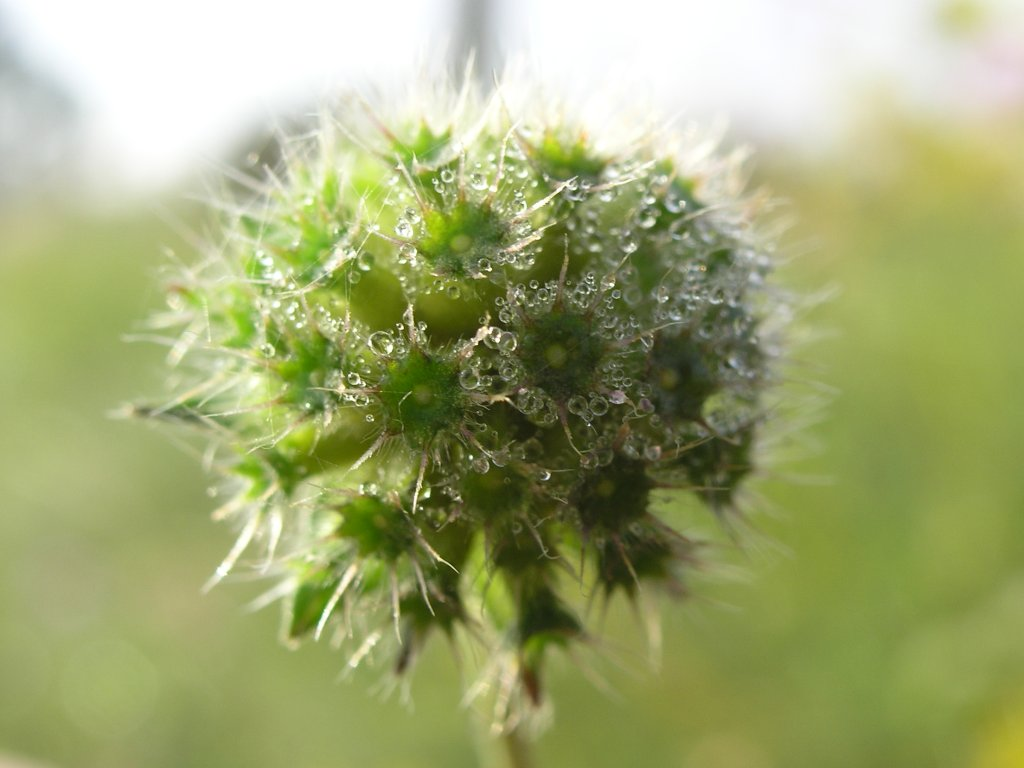
Young fruit

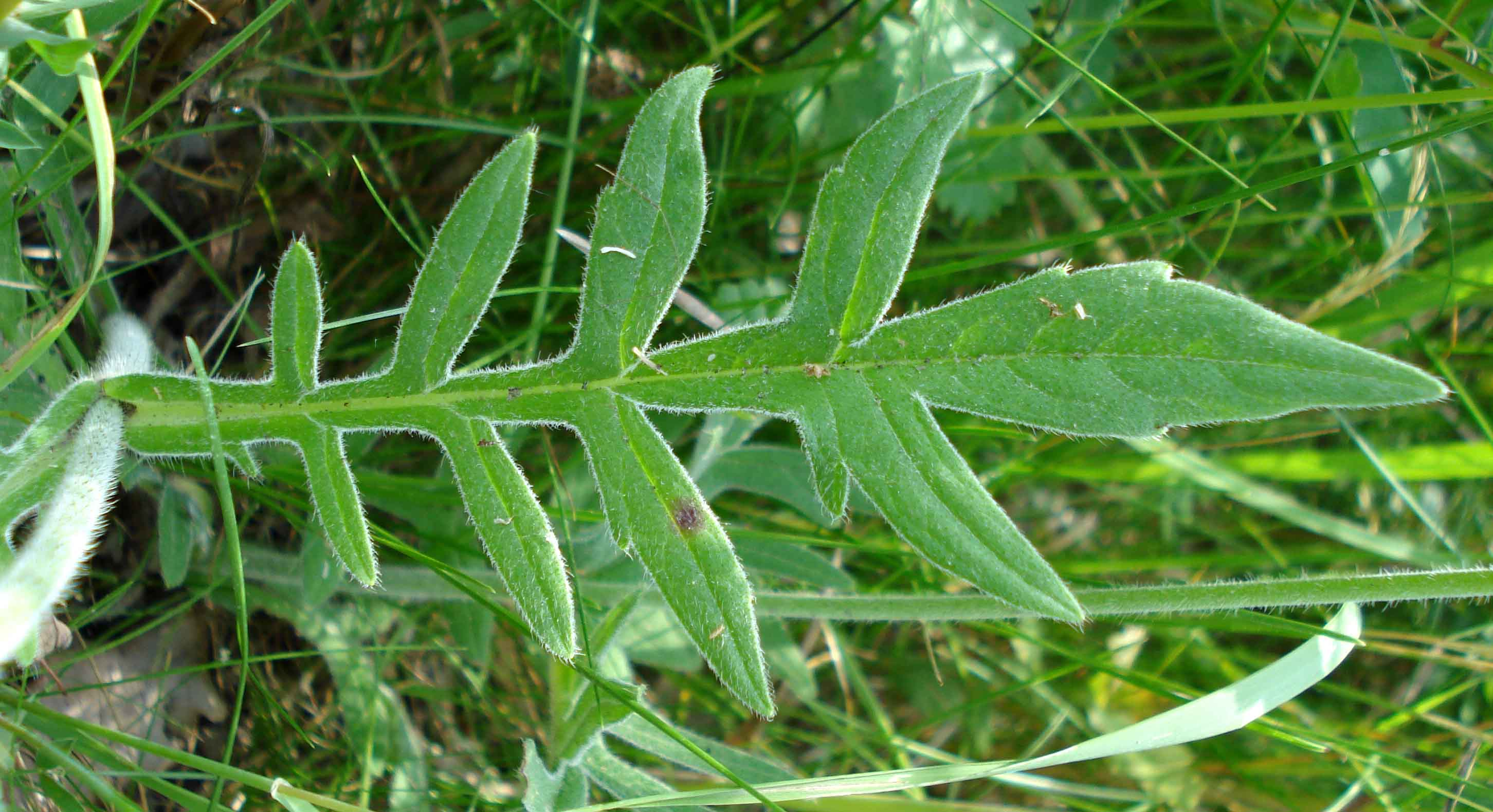
Basal leaf - note that in this species it is lobed, whereas Devils Bit scabious it is not

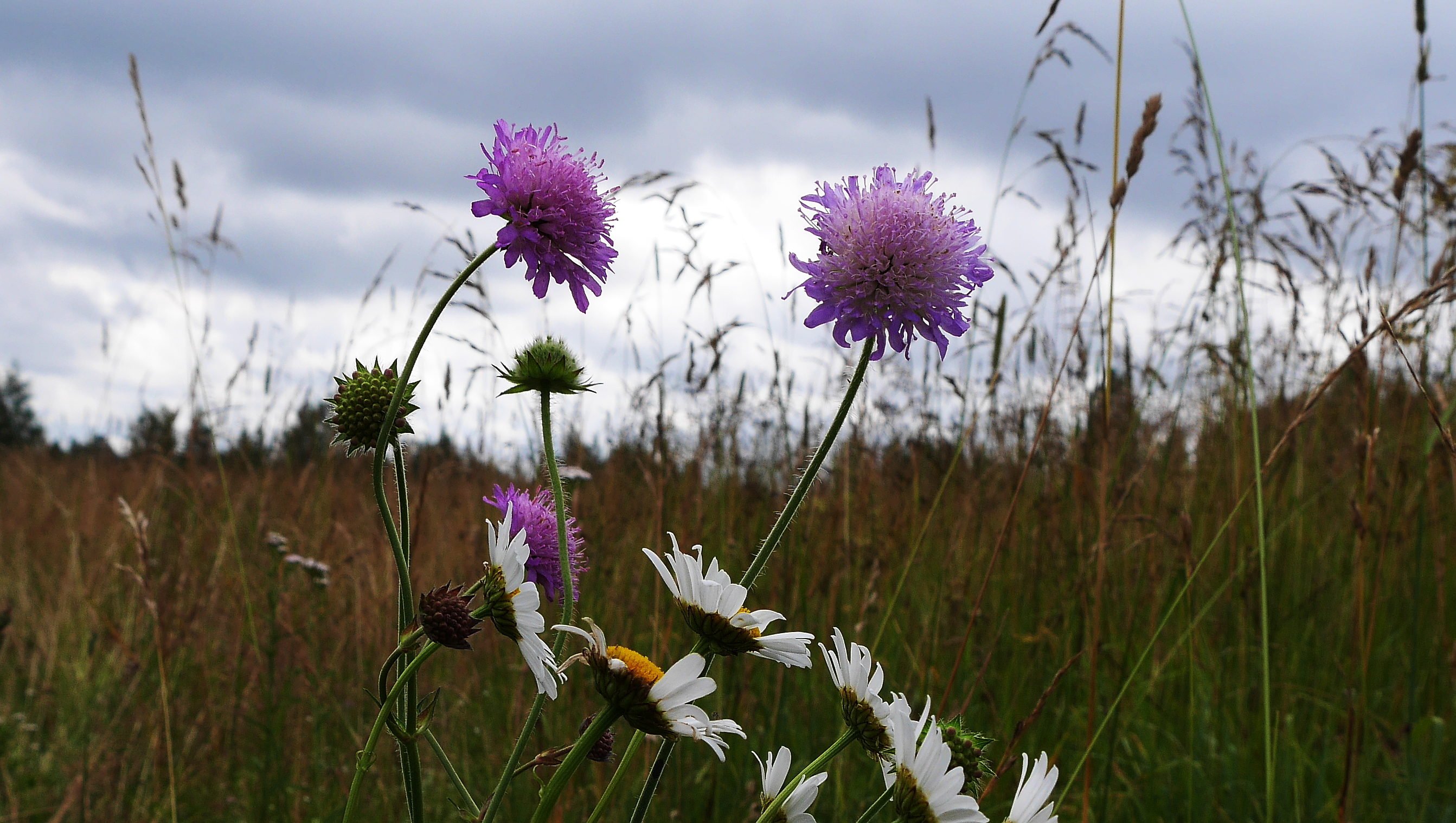
In Belarus

Field scabious phenology
