= Christian Knaut =

Christian Knaut (August 16, 1656 – April 11, 1716) was a German physician, botanist and librarian born in Halle an der Saale. His older brother, Christoph Knaut (1638–1694) was also a physician and botanist.

He studied medicine at the University of Leipzig, where he had as instructors Gottfried Welsch, Paul Amman, Michael Ettmüller and Johannes Bohn. In 1682 he obtained his doctorate from the University of Jena with a dissertation titled De fermentatione in sanguine non existente. Afterwards he returned to Halle, where he served as a librarian and personal physician to Prince Emanuel Lebrecht of Anhalt-Köthen. As a librarian he was the author of a chronicle and description involving the counties of Ballenstädt and Aschersleben (1698).

As a botanist, he published Compendium Botanicum sive Methodus plantarum genuina, in which he provided a classification system for flowering plants based on petal number and arrangement. The plant genus Knautia was named after Christian and Christoph Knaut by Carolus Linnaeus.
