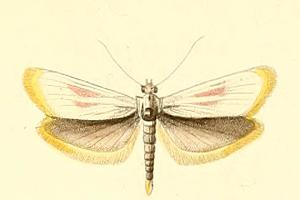
- Eurhodope cruentella

Scientific classification
- Kingdom: Animalia
- Phylum: Arthropoda
- Clade: Pancrustacea
- Class: Insecta
- Order: Lepidoptera
- Family: Pyralidae
- Tribe: Phycitini
- Genus: Eurhodope; Hübner, 1825

Synonyms
- Eurhopode Caradja, 1899; Eurodope Zeller, 1846; Eudorope Zeller, 1846; Eurrhodope Hübner, 1826; Kyra Gozmány, 1958; Semnia Guenée, 1845

= Eurhodope =

Genus of moths

Eurhodope is a genus of snout moths. It was described by Jacob Hübner in 1825.

== Species ==
- Eurhodope cinerea (Staudinger, 1879)
- Eurhodope cirrigerella (Zincken, 1818)
- Eurhodope confusella (Walker, 1866)
- Eurhodope cruentella Duponchel, 1842
- Eurhodope incensella Staudinger, 1859
- Eurhodope incompta Zeller, 1847
- Eurhodope infixella (Walker, 1866)
- Eurhodope monogrammos Zeller, 1867
- Eurhodope notulella (Ragonot, 1888)
- Eurhodope nyctosia Balinsky, 1991
- Eurhodope rosella Scopoli, 1763
