= Stenoptilia stigmatodactylus =

Scientific classification
- Kingdom: Animalia
- Phylum: Arthropoda
- Clade: Pancrustacea
- Class: Insecta
- Order: Lepidoptera
- Family: Pterophoridae
- Genus: Stenoptilia
- Species: S. stigmatodactylus

Binomial name
- Stenoptilia stigmatodactylus (Zeller, 1852)

Synonyms
- Pterophorus stigmatodactylus Zeller, 1852; Pterophorus oreodactylus Zeller, 1852

Species of plume moth

Stenoptilia stigmatodactylus is a moth of the family Pterophoridae. It is found in western, central and Mediterranean Europe, extending into Asia Minor and North Africa. It is also known from Iran, Russia and Armenia.

The wingspan is 17–23 mm.

The larvae feed on Thymus vulgaris, Scabiosa ochroleuca, Scabiosa lucida and Knautia arvensis. They eat the blossoms and the seeds. Pupation occurs on the stem of the host plant. A loose web surrounds the pupa.
