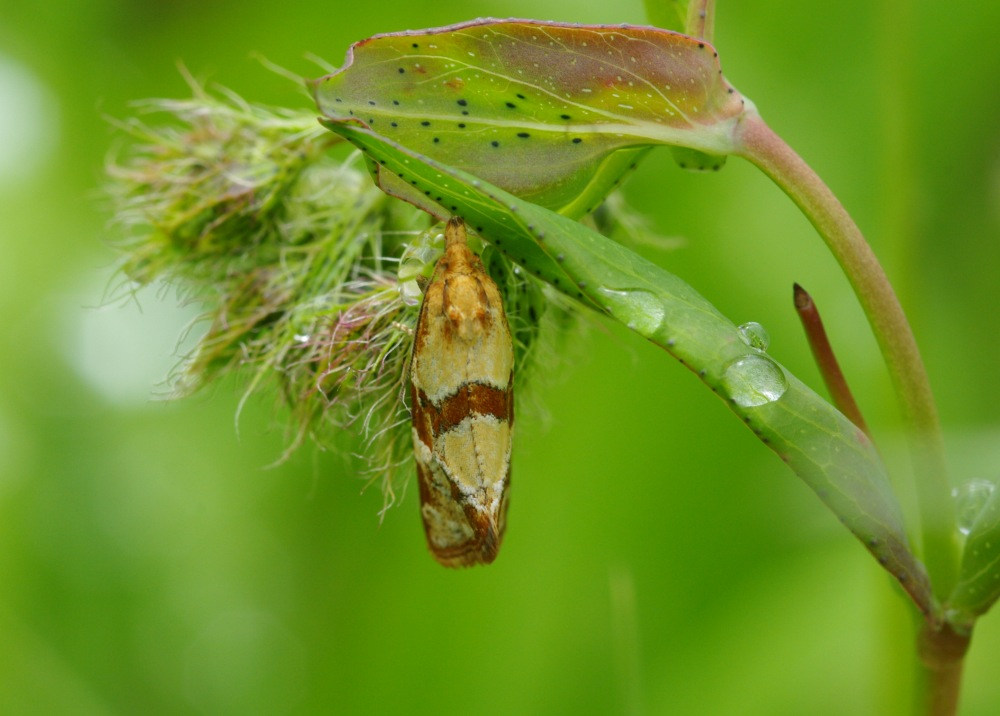
- Aethes hartmanniana in Nikšić, Montenegro

Scientific classification
- Domain: Eukaryota
- Kingdom: Animalia
- Phylum: Arthropoda
- Class: Insecta
- Order: Lepidoptera
- Family: Tortricidae
- Genus: Aethes
- Species: A. hartmanniana

Binomial name
- Aethes hartmanniana (Clerck, [1759)])

Synonyms
- Phalaena hartmanniana Clerck, 1759; Phalaena allioniana Villers, 1789; Agapeta avellana Hübner, 1822; Tortrix baumanniana [Denis & Schiffermüller], 1775; Conchylis hartmanniana var. excelsior Schawerda, 1920; Phalaena (Tortrix) lyonetella Linnaeus, 1758; Conchylis deutschiana var. murciana Caradja, 1916; Argyrolepia subbaumanniana Wilkinson, 1859; Phalaena (Tinea) wiedemannella Muller, 1764

= Aethes hartmanniana =

Scabious conch

Species of moth

Aethes hartmanniana, the scabious conch, is a moth of the family Tortricidae. It was described by Carl Alexander Clerck in 1759. It is found in most of Europe, Asia Minor, Armenia and the southern Urals. The species occurs in chalky and limestone habitats.

The wingspan is 15–23 millimetres (0.59–0.91 in). Adults are on wing from June to August.

The larvae feed on Scabiosa ochroleuca, Succisa and Knautia species. They feed within the roots of their host plant. The species overwinters and pupates in the larval habitation during spring.
