= S. pentaphylla =

S. pentaphylla may refer to:

- Sophora pentaphylla, a pea with uncertain taxonomic status
- Succisa pentaphylla, a honeysuckle first described by Conrad Moench
