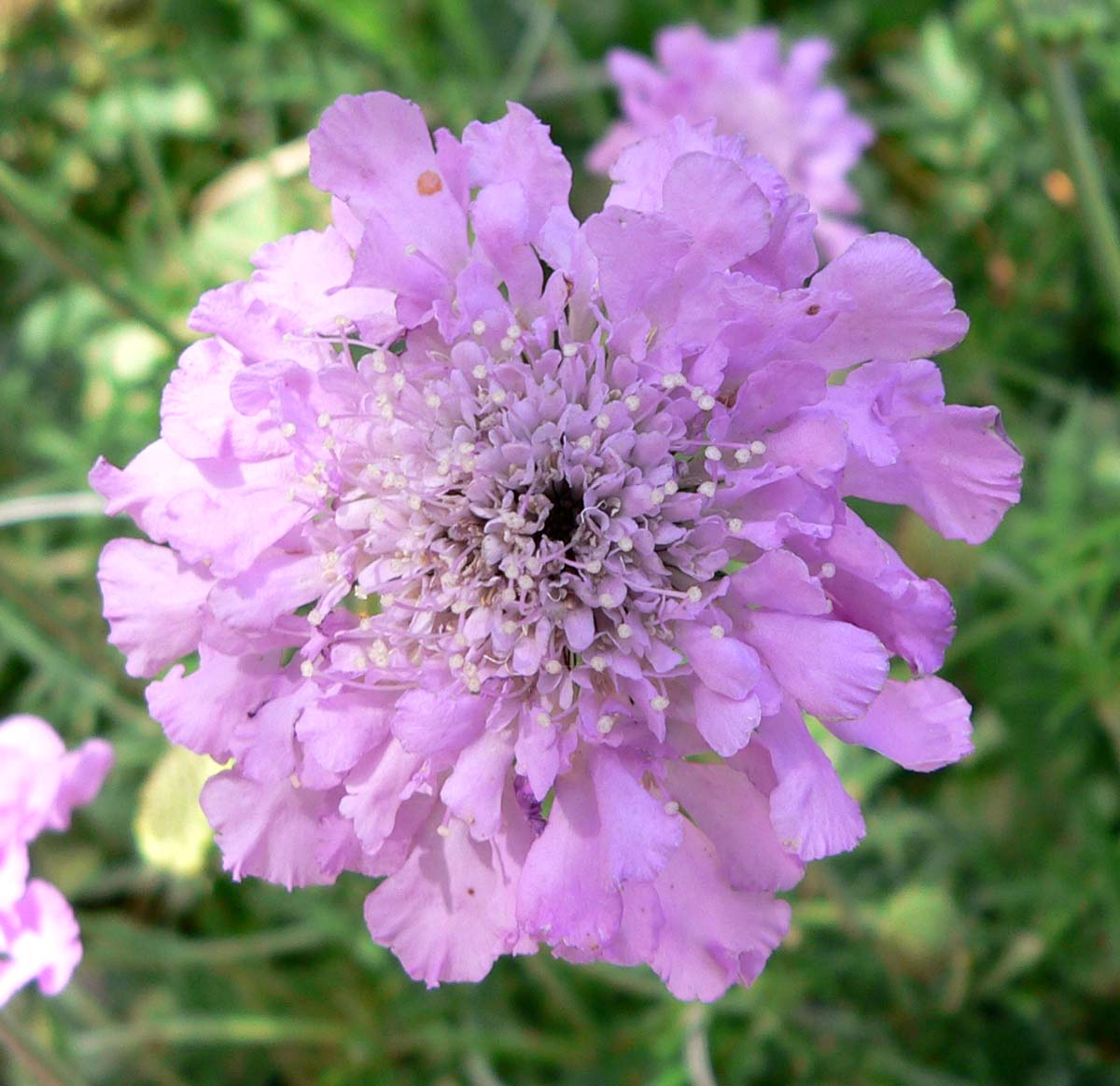
- Scabiosa columbaria 'Pink Mist'

Scientific classification
- Kingdom: Plantae
- Clade: Embryophytes
- Clade: Tracheophytes
- Clade: Spermatophytes
- Clade: Angiosperms
- Clade: Eudicots
- Clade: Asterids
- Order: Dipsacales
- Family: Caprifoliaceae
- Subfamily: Dipsacoideae
- Genus: Scabiosa; L., nom cons.

Species
- See Species section.

Synonyms
- Synonymy: Acura Hill; Anisodens Dulac; Asterocephalus Zinn; Astrocephalus Raf., orth. var.; Chetastrum Neck., opus utique oppr.; Columbaria J.Presl & C.Presl; Cyrtostemma (Mert. & W.D.J.Koch) Spach; Euptilia Raf.; Gonokeros Raf.; Pentena Raf.; Scabiosella Tiegh.; Sclerostemma Schott; Sixalix Raf.; Spongostemma (Rchb.) Rchb.; Trichopteris Neck., opus utique oppr.; Trochocephalus (Mert. & W.D.J.Koch) Opiz

= Scabiosa =

Genus of flowering plants in the honeysuckle family

Scabiosa /skeɪbiˈoʊsə/ is a genus in the honeysuckle family (Caprifoliaceae) of flowering plants. Many of the species in this genus have common names that include the word scabious, but some plants commonly known as scabious are currently classified in related genera such as Knautia and Succisa; at least some of these were formerly placed in Scabiosa. Another common name for members of this genus is pincushion flowers.

== Etymology ==
The common name 'scabious' comes the Latin word scabiosus meaning 'mangy, rough or itchy' which refers to the herb's traditional usage as a folk medicine to treat scabies, an illness that causes a severe itching sensation.

== Description ==
Some species of Scabiosa are annuals, others perennials. Some are herbaceous plants; others have woody rootstocks. The leaves of most species are somewhat hairy and partly divided into lobes, but a few are smooth and some species have simple leaves. The flowers are borne on inflorescences in the form of heads; each head contains many small florets, each floret cupped in a membranous, saucer-shaped bract. The calyx has five sepals in the form of awns almost as long as the petals. After the flowers have dropped, the calyces together with the bracts form a spiky ball that may be the reason for the "pincushion" common name. The calyx is persistent and remains as a crown on the fruit after it is shed. The corolla has four to five lobes fringing a narrow funnel with a furry throat, the funnel being somewhat longer than the lobes. The florets have four stamens each, set high in the tube, and sticking out. Each fruit has just one seed.

In a few species the heads are sessile but in most species they are borne singly on a tall peduncle.

Scabiosa species and varieties differ in the colours of their flowers, but most are soft lavender blue, lilac or creamy white.

== Taxonomy ==
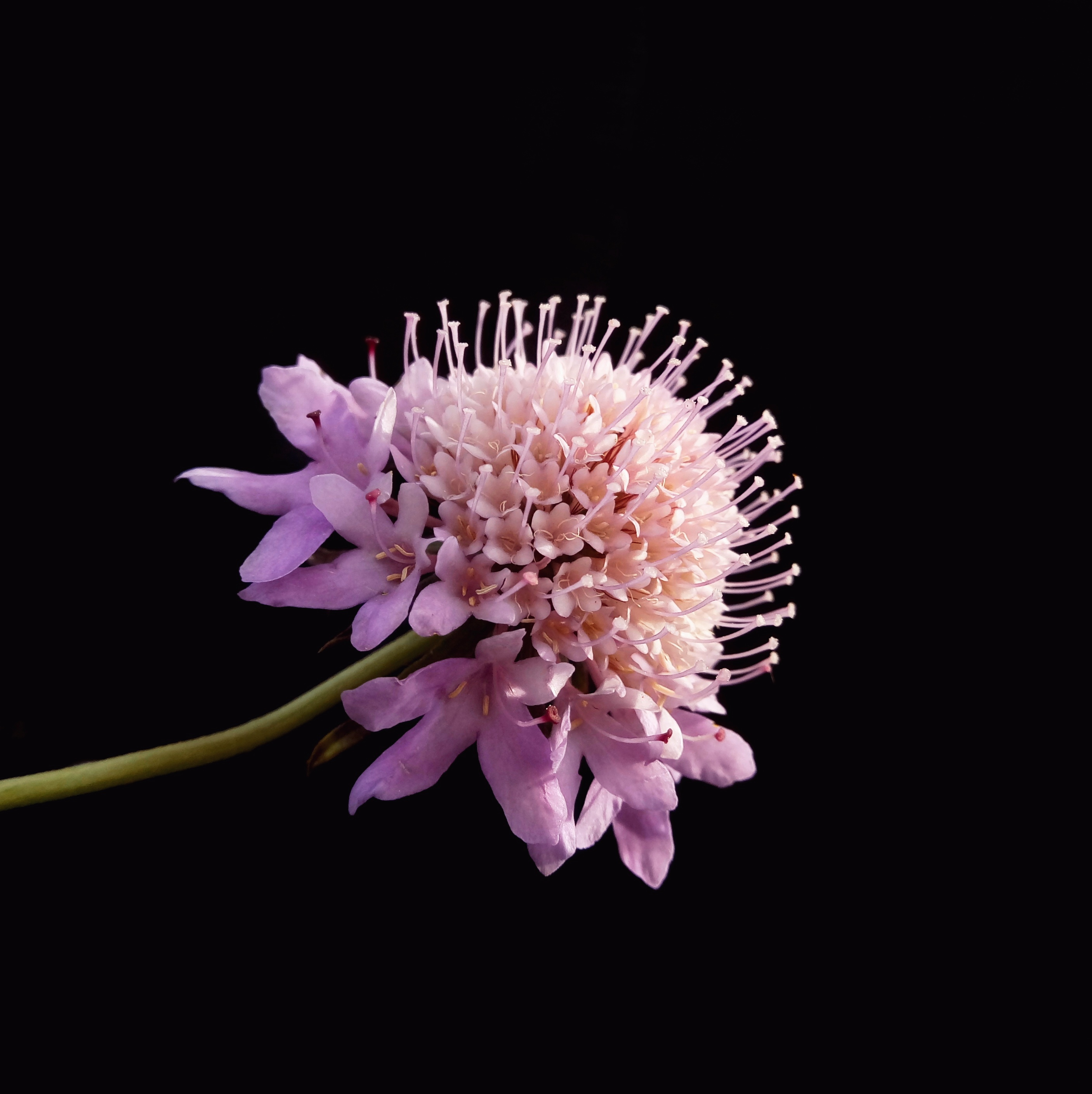
Scabiosa atropurpurea subsp. maritima

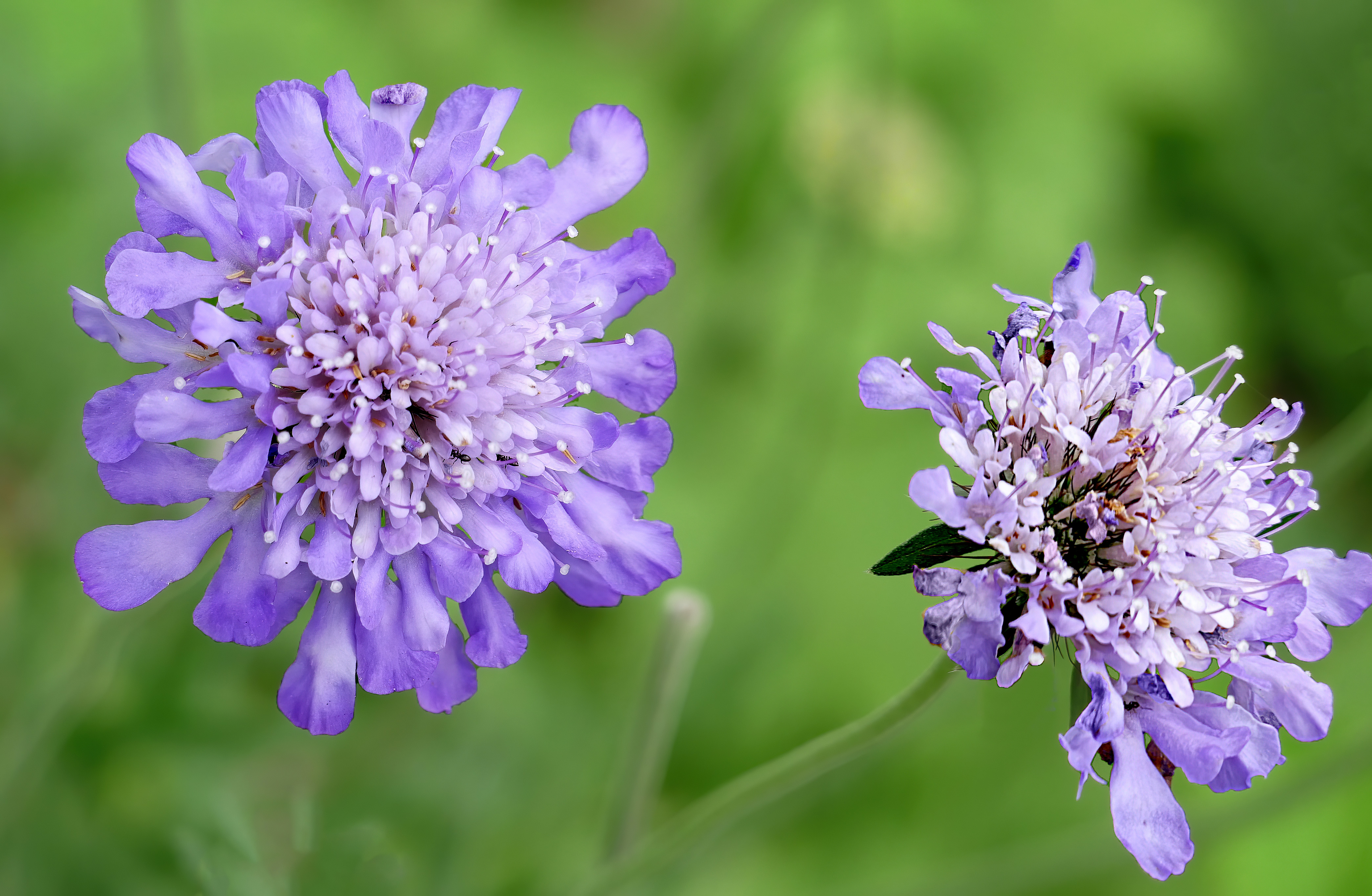
Pincushion flower, Scabiosa triandra

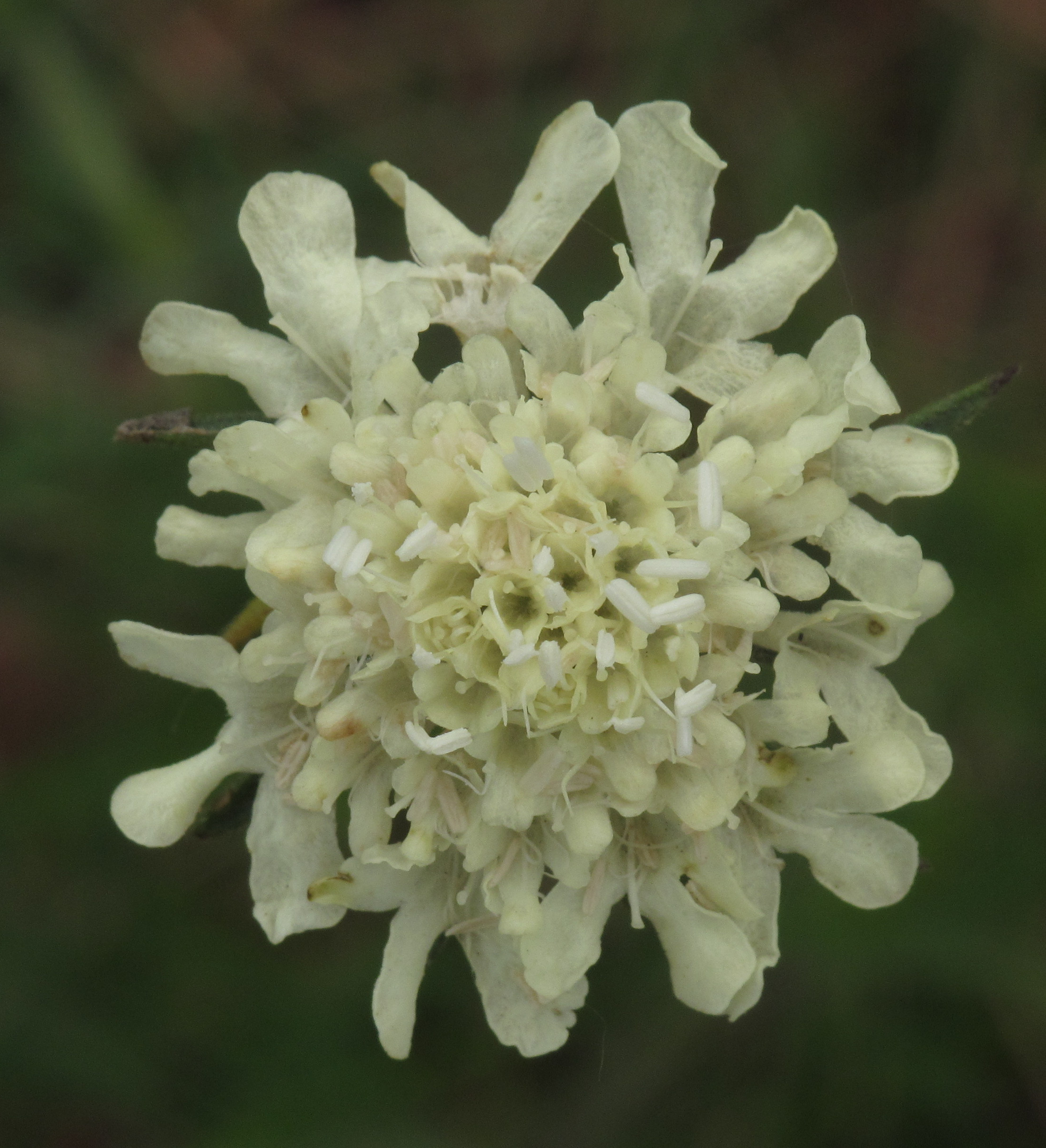
Cream scabiousm, Scabiosa ochroleuca

It was first published in Species Plantarum on page 98 in 1753.

=== Species ===
As accepted by Plants of the World Online;

- Scabiosa adzharica Schchian
- Scabiosa africana L.
- Scabiosa albanensis R.A.Dyer
- Scabiosa amoena J.Jacq.
- Scabiosa andryifolia (Pau) Devesa
- Scabiosa angustiloba (Sond.) B.L.Burtt ex Hutch.
- Scabiosa arenaria Forssk.
- Scabiosa atropurpurea L.
- Scabiosa austroafricana Heine
- Scabiosa balcanica (Velen.) Velen.
- Scabiosa × beauverdiana Palez.
- Scabiosa bipinnata K.Koch
- Scabiosa buekiana Eckl. & Zeyh.
- Scabiosa canescens Waldst. & Kit.
- Scabiosa cartenniana A.Pons & Quézel
- Scabiosa cephalarioides Lojac.
- Scabiosa cinerea Lapeyr. ex Lam.
- Scabiosa colchica Steven
- Scabiosa columbaria L.
- Scabiosa comosa Fisch. ex Roem. & Schult.
- Scabiosa correvoniana Sommier & Levier
- Scabiosa corsica (Litard.) Gamisans
- Scabiosa crinita Kotschy & Boiss.
- Scabiosa daucoides Desf.
- Scabiosa drakensbergensis B.L.Burtt
- Scabiosa eremophila Boiss.
- Scabiosa farinosa Coss.
- Scabiosa fumarioides Vis. & Pančić
- Scabiosa galianoi Devesa, Ortega Oliv. & J.López
- Scabiosa holosericea Bertol.
- Scabiosa imeretica (Sommier & Levier) Sulak.
- Scabiosa incisa Mill.
- Scabiosa ispartaca Yıld.
- Scabiosa japonica Miq.
- Scabiosa jezoensis Nakai
- Scabiosa lacerifolia Hayata
- Scabiosa lachnophylla Kitag.
- Scabiosa libyca Alavi
- Scabiosa lucida Vill.
- Scabiosa × lucidula Beck
- Scabiosa mollissima Viv.
- Scabiosa nitens Roem. & Schult.
- Scabiosa ochroleuca L.
- Scabiosa owerinii Boiss.
- Scabiosa paphlagonica Bornm.
- Scabiosa parielii Maire
- Scabiosa parviflora Desf.
- Scabiosa praemontana Privalova
- Scabiosa pyrenaica All.
- Scabiosa semipapposa Salzm. ex DC.
- Scabiosa silenifolia Waldst. & Kit.
- Scabiosa sirnakia Yıld.
- Scabiosa sivrihisarica Yıld.
- Scabiosa solymica (Parolly, Eren & Nordt) Göktürk
- Scabiosa sosnowskyi Sulak.
- Scabiosa taygetea Boiss. & Heldr.
- Scabiosa tenuis Spruner ex Boiss.
- Scabiosa thysdrusiana Le Houér.
- Scabiosa transvaalensis S.Moore
- Scabiosa triandra L.
- Scabiosa triniifolia Friv.
- Scabiosa turolensis Pau
- Scabiosa tuzluca Yıld.
- Scabiosa tysonii L.Bolus
- Scabiosa velenovskiana Bobrov
- Scabiosa vestina Facchini ex W.D.J.Koch
- Scabiosa webbiana D.Don

== Distribution ==
Members of this genus are native to Africa, Europe and Asia. Some species of Scabiosa, notably small scabious (S. columbaria) and Mediterranean sweet scabious (S. atropurpurea) have been developed into cultivars for gardeners.

In 1782, a mysterious pale yellow scabious, called "Scabiosa trenta", was described by Belsazar Hacquet, an Austrian physician, botanist, and mountaineer, in his work Plantae alpinae Carniolicae. It became a great source of inspiration for later botanists and mountaineers discovering the Julian Alps, especially Julius Kugy. The Austrian botanist Anton Kerner von Marilaun later proved Belsazar Hacquet had not found a new species, but a specimen of the already known submediterranean Cephalaria leucantha.

They are found in various habitats such as Scabiosa solymica (formerly named Lomelosia solymica), which is a chasmophyte (a plant adapted to growing in crevices or hollows) of montane, sea facing cliffs of the Tahtalı Dağı (mountain) in the western Taurus Mountains, south of Antalya, Turkey.

== Ecology ==
Scabious flowers are nectar rich and attractive to many insects including butterflies and moths such as the six-spot burnet. Scabiosa species are food plants for the larvae of some species of Lepidoptera such as the grey pug moth.
