= Succisa trichotocephala =

Conservation status
- Near Threatened (IUCN 3.1)

Scientific classification
- Kingdom: Plantae
- Clade: Tracheophytes
- Clade: Angiosperms
- Clade: Eudicots
- Clade: Asterids
- Order: Dipsacales
- Family: Caprifoliaceae
- Genus: Succisa
- Species: S. trichotocephala

Binomial name
- Succisa trichotocephala Baksay

Species of flowering plant

Succisa trichotocephala is a species of plant in the family Caprifoliaceae. It is endemic to Cameroon. Its natural habitat is subtropical or tropical dry lowland grassland. It is threatened by habitat loss.
