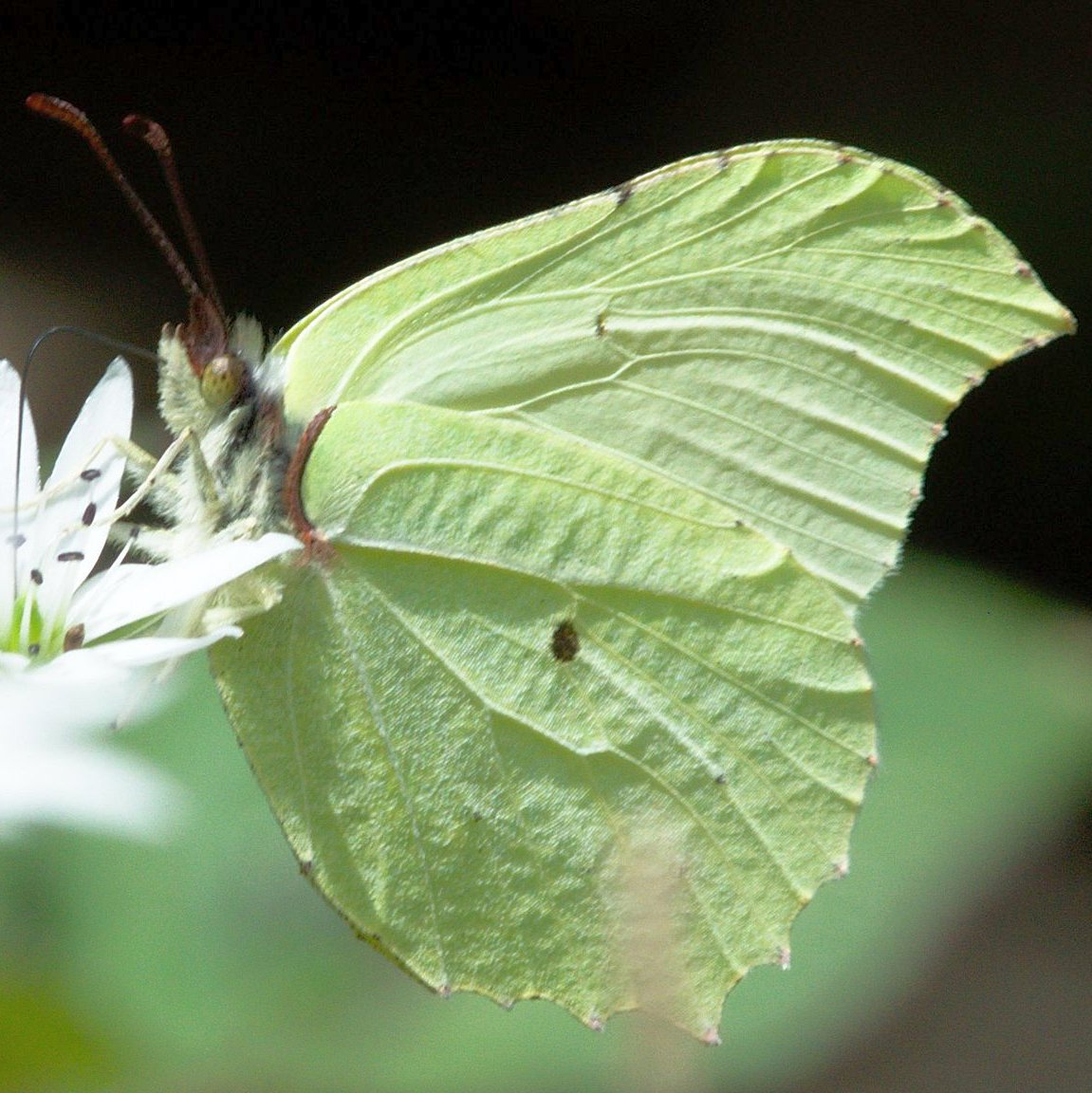

Scientific classification
- Kingdom: Animalia
- Phylum: Arthropoda
- Class: Insecta
- Order: Lepidoptera
- Family: Pieridae
- Genus: Gonepteryx
- Species: G. mahaguru

Binomial name
- Gonepteryx mahaguru Gistel, 1857

= Gonepteryx mahaguru =

Species of butterfly

Gonepteryx mahaguru, the lesser brimstone, is a medium-sized butterfly of the family Pieridae, that is, the yellows and whites. It is native to the Kashmir, Uttarakhand, China, Korea, and Japan.

== Relation to Gonepteryx aspasia ==
Though there has historically been confusion regarding whether G. mahaguru and G. aspasia are different species – exacerbated by the fact that Ménétriès's 1859 description of G. aspasia received widespread recognition while Gistel's earlier 1857 description of G. mahaguru was unknown to his contemporaries – they have since been determined to be different species.

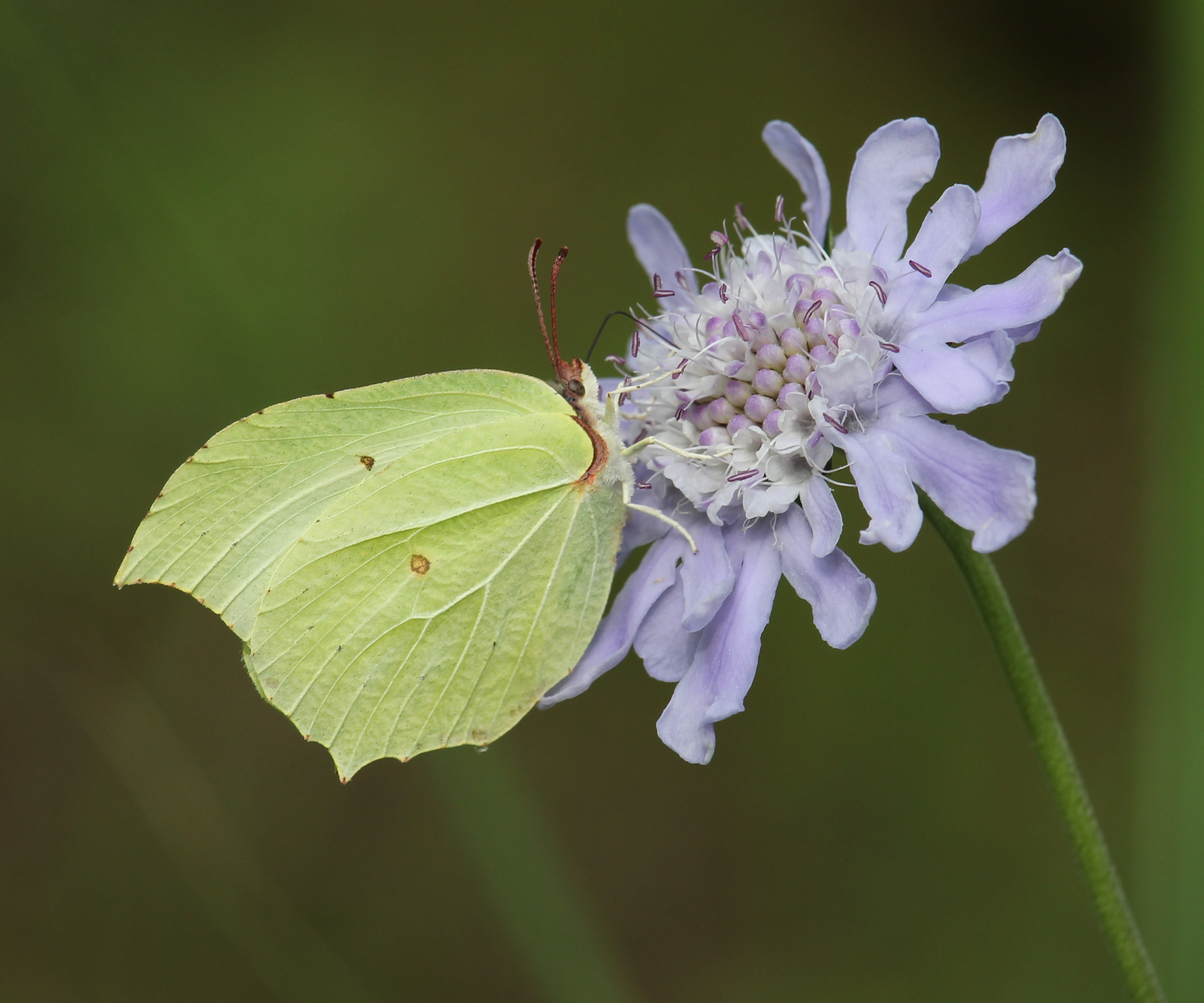
Here labeled as G. aspasia on Scabiosa japonica

== See also ==
- List of butterflies of India (Pieridae)
