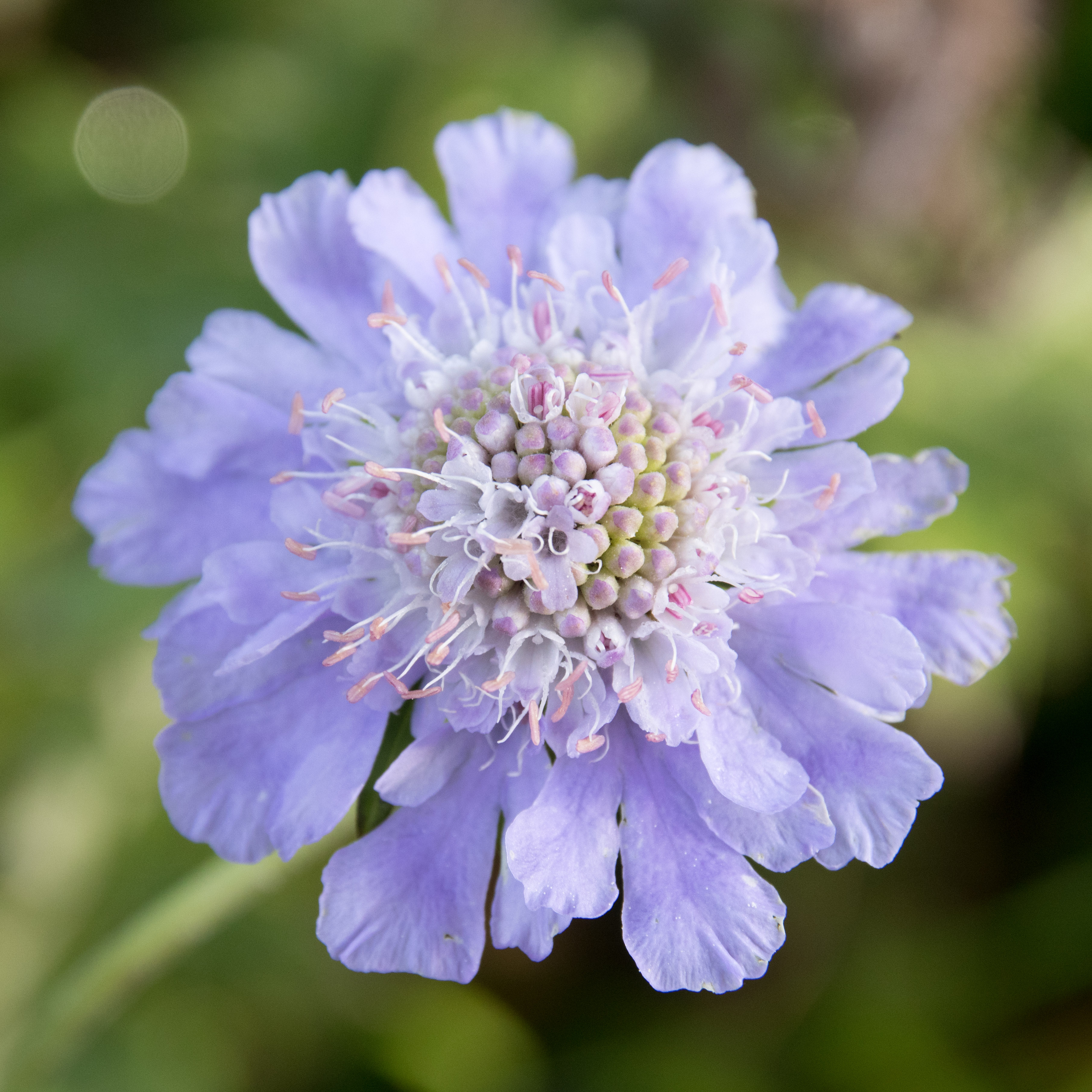
- Close-up of flower
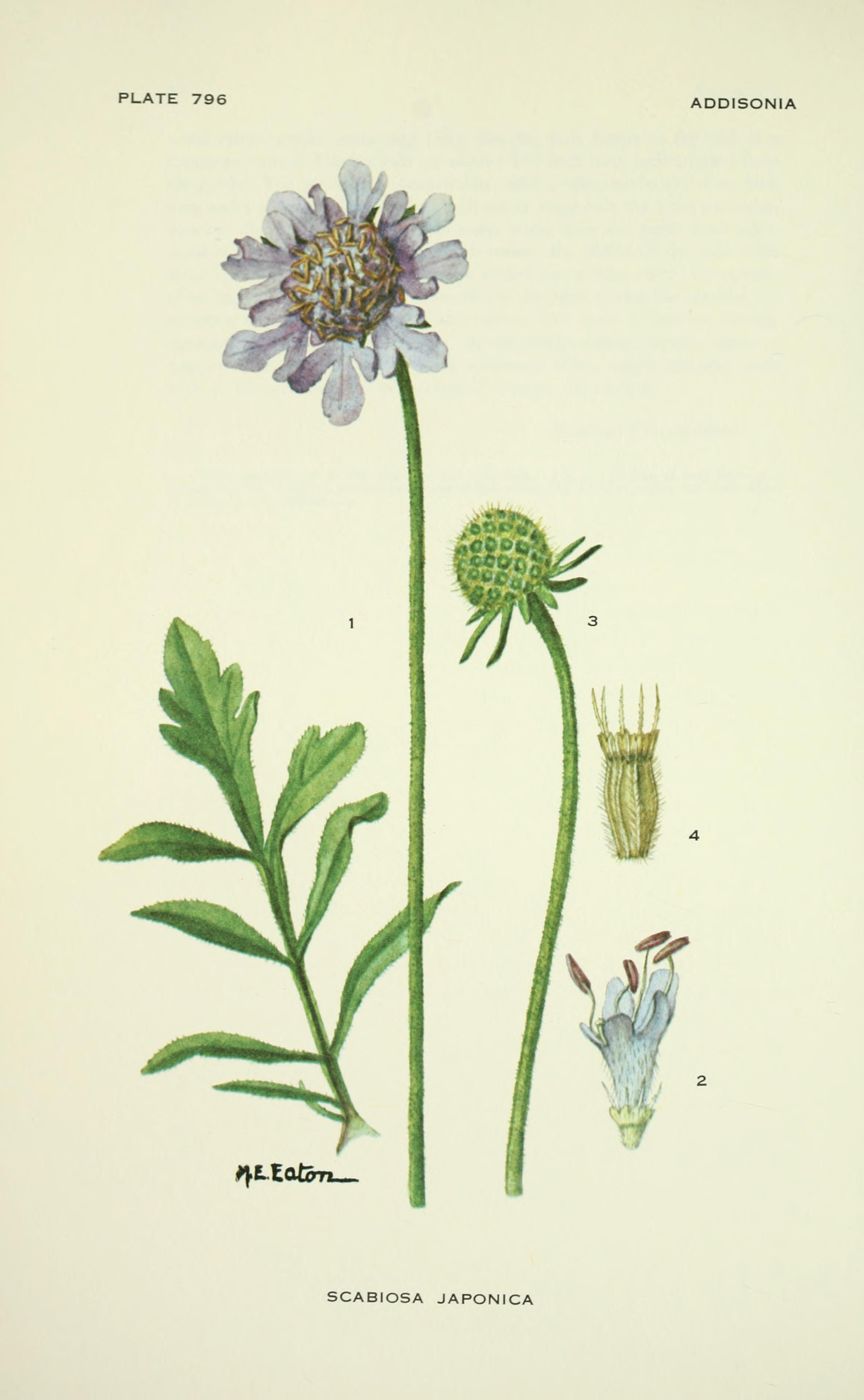
- Botanical illustration

Scientific classification
- Kingdom: Plantae
- Clade: Embryophytes
- Clade: Tracheophytes
- Clade: Angiosperms
- Clade: Eudicots
- Clade: Asterids
- Order: Dipsacales
- Family: Caprifoliaceae
- Genus: Scabiosa
- Species: S. japonica

Binomial name
- Scabiosa japonica Miq.

Synonyms
- Trochocephalus japonicus (Miq.) Á.Löve & D.Löve

= Scabiosa japonica =

Species of flowering plant

Scabiosa japonica is a species of flowering plant in the pincushion flower genus Scabiosa (family Caprifoliaceae), native to central and southern Japan, and introduced to the Dominican Republic. A biennial or short-lived perennial reaching 10 to 50 cm (4 to 20 in), the Royal Horticultural Society considers it a good plant to attract pollinators. A number of cultivars are commercially available, including 'Blue Note', 'Blue Star', 'Blue Diamonds', 'Ritz Blue', and 'Ritz Rose'.

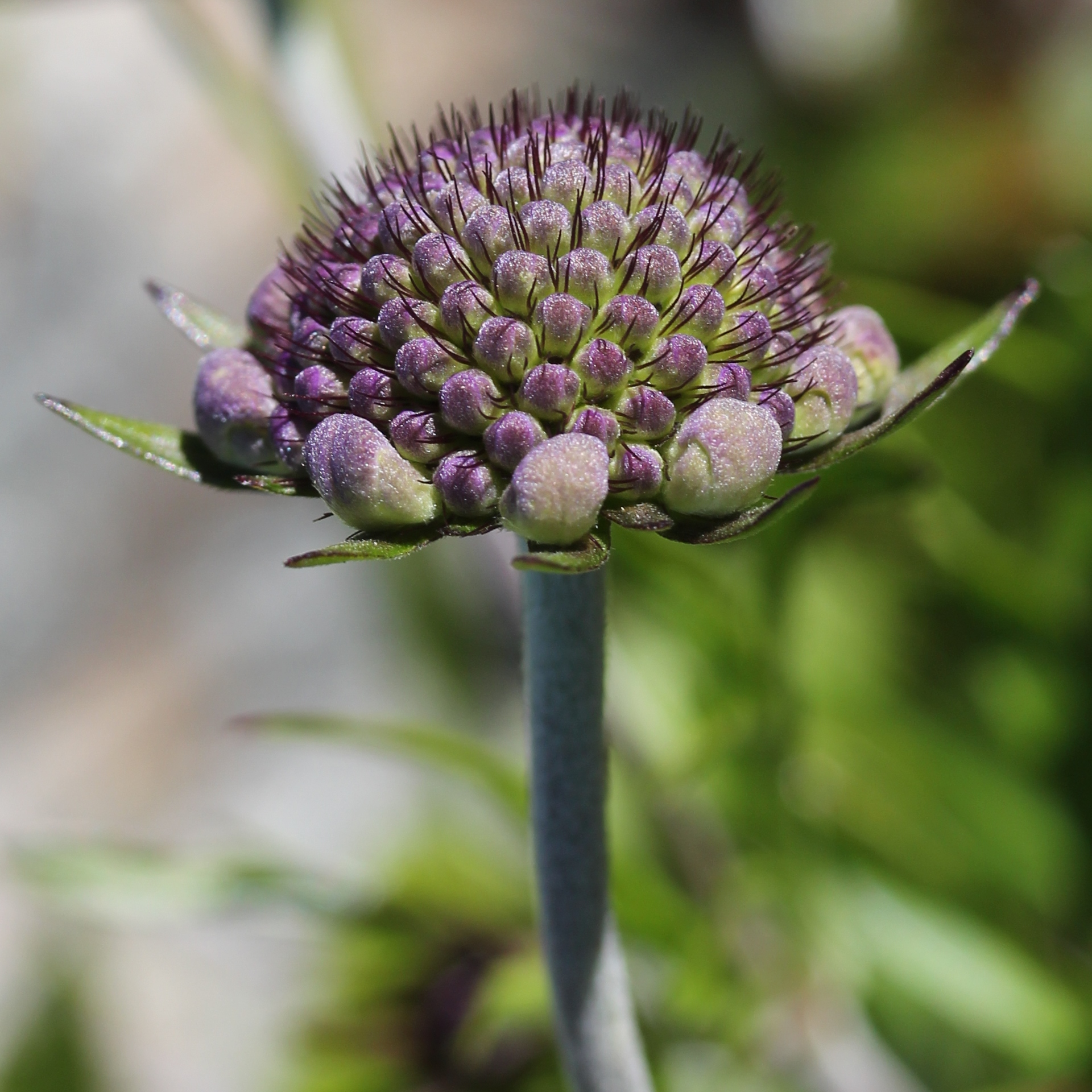
Budding flower

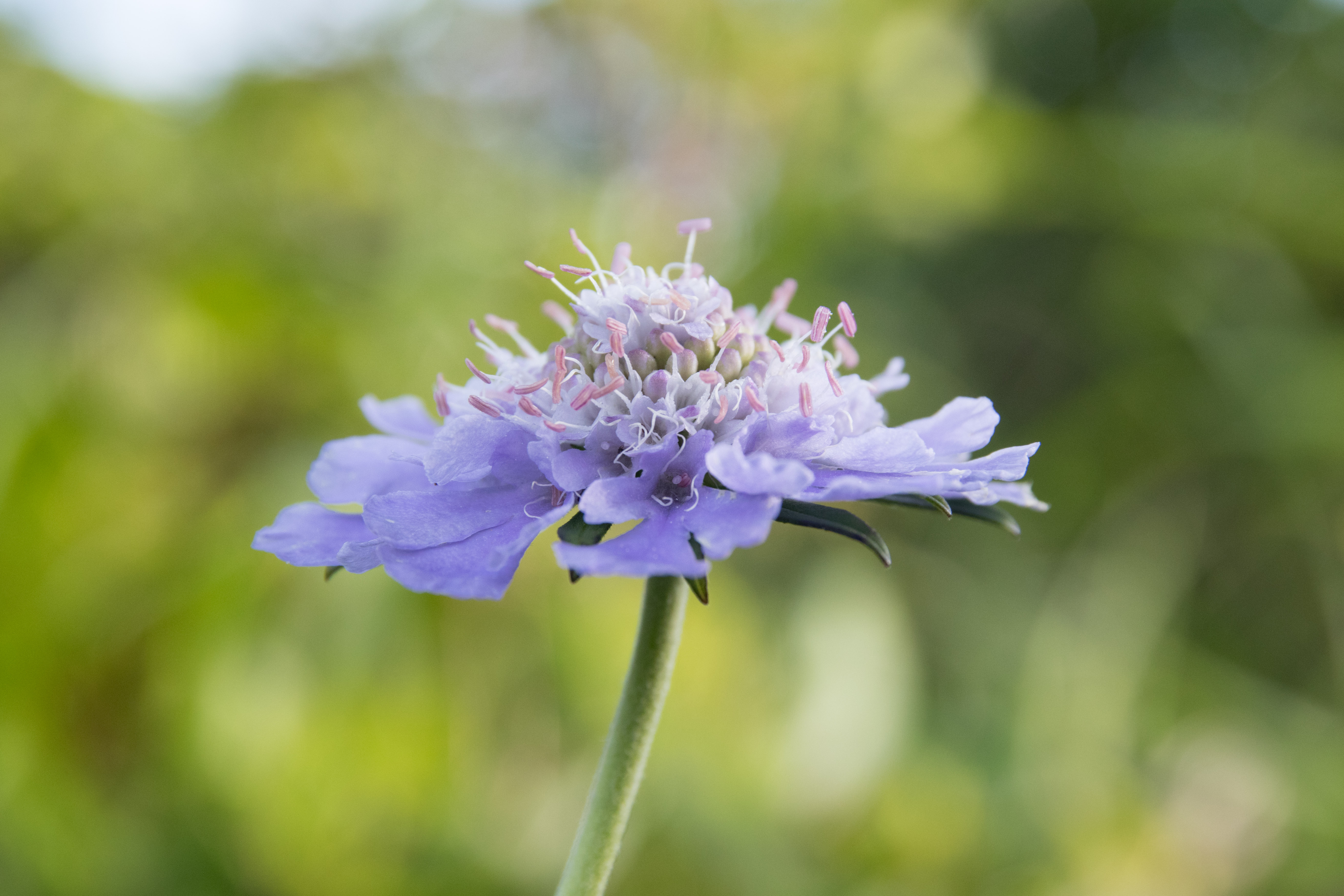
Side view of flower

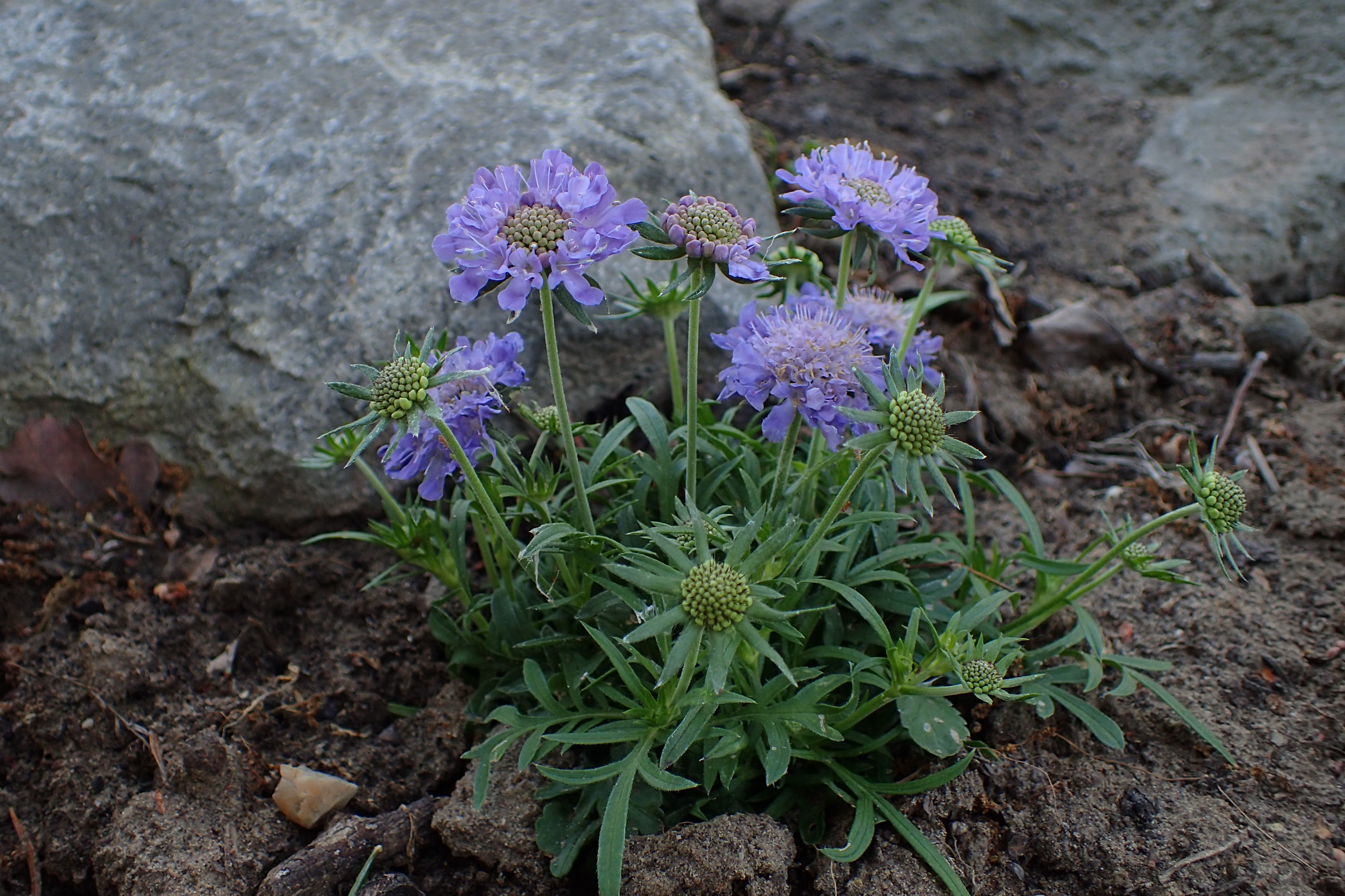
Habit

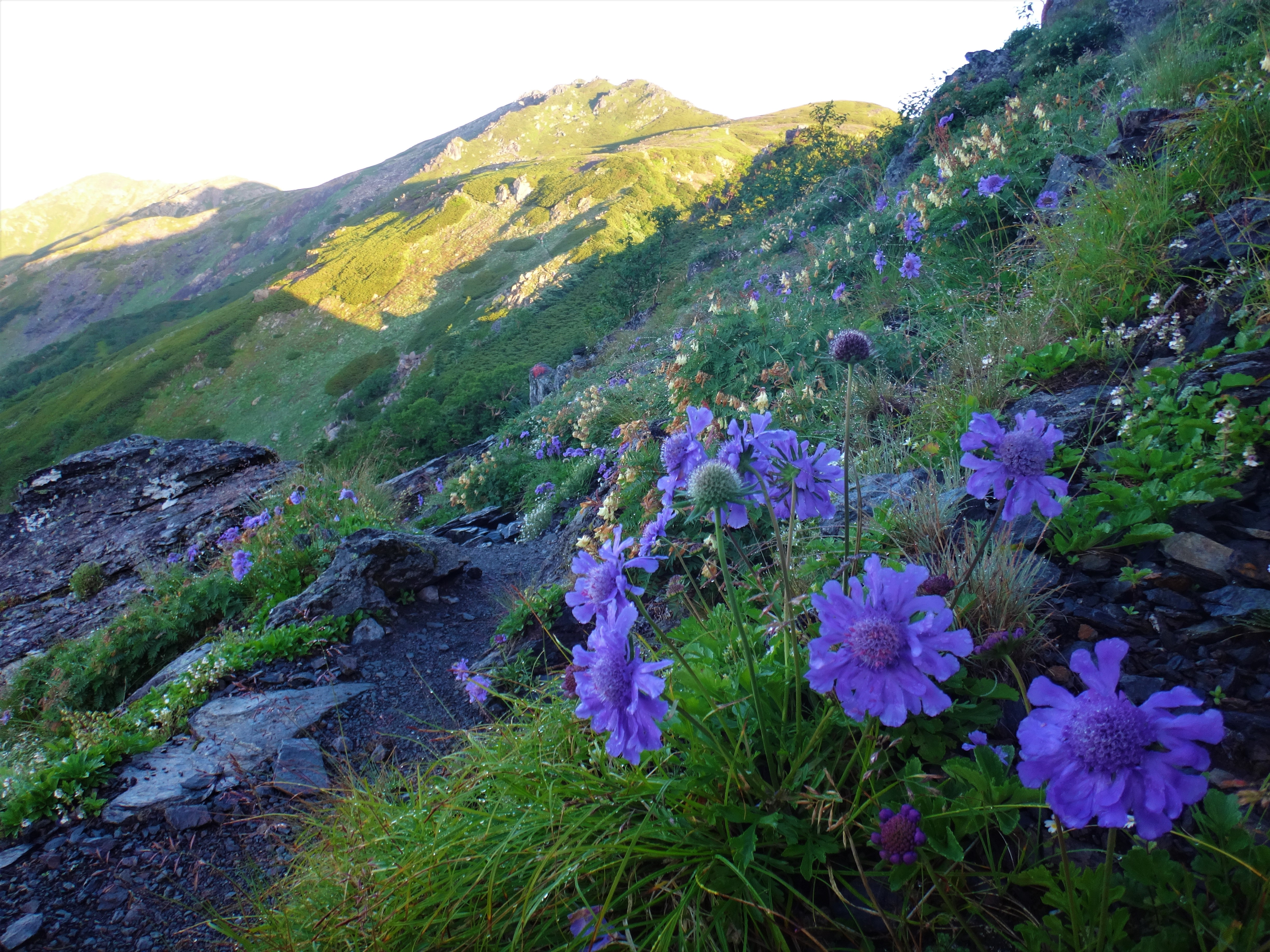
On a mountainside

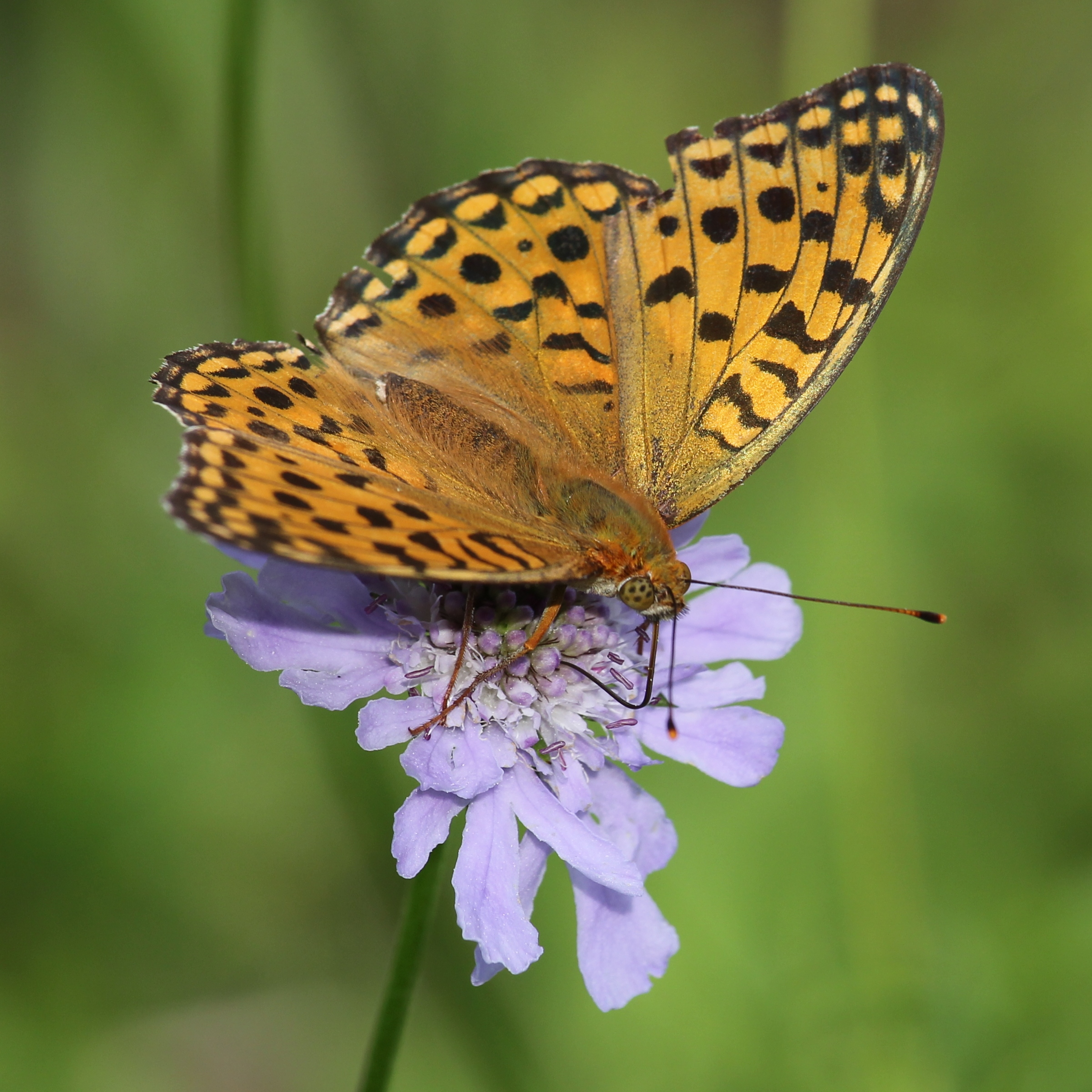
Fabriciana adippe

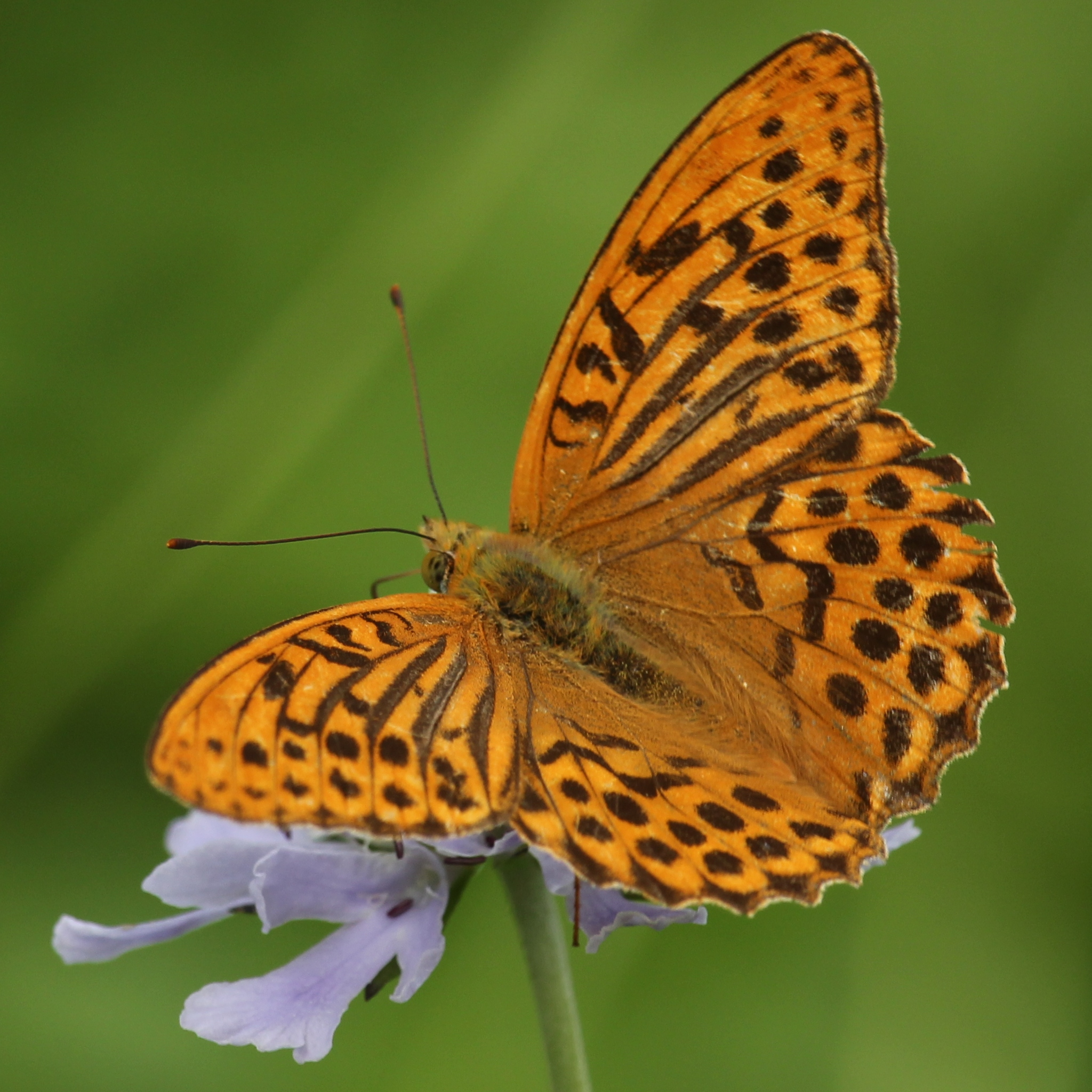
Argynnis paphia

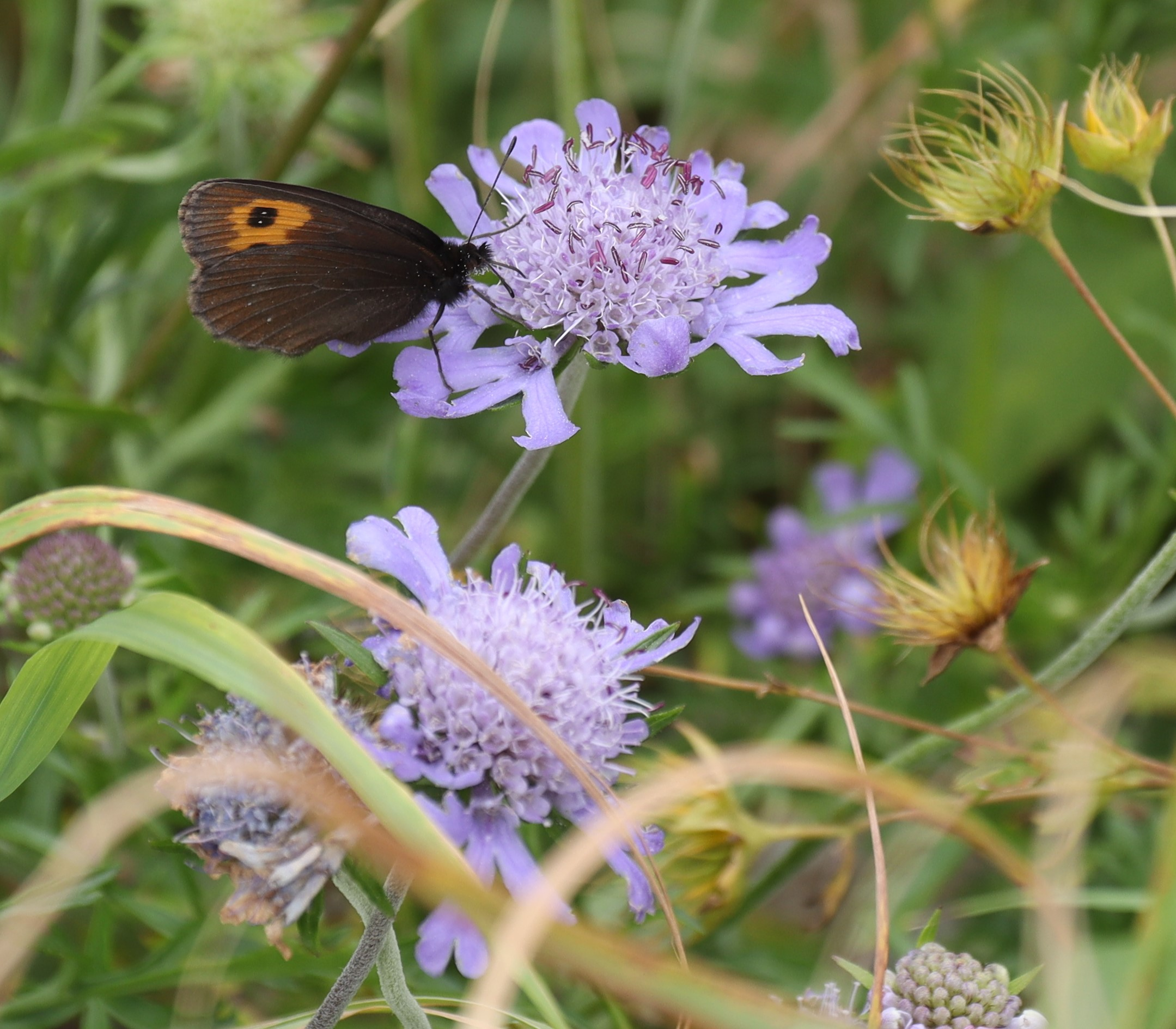
Erebia neriene

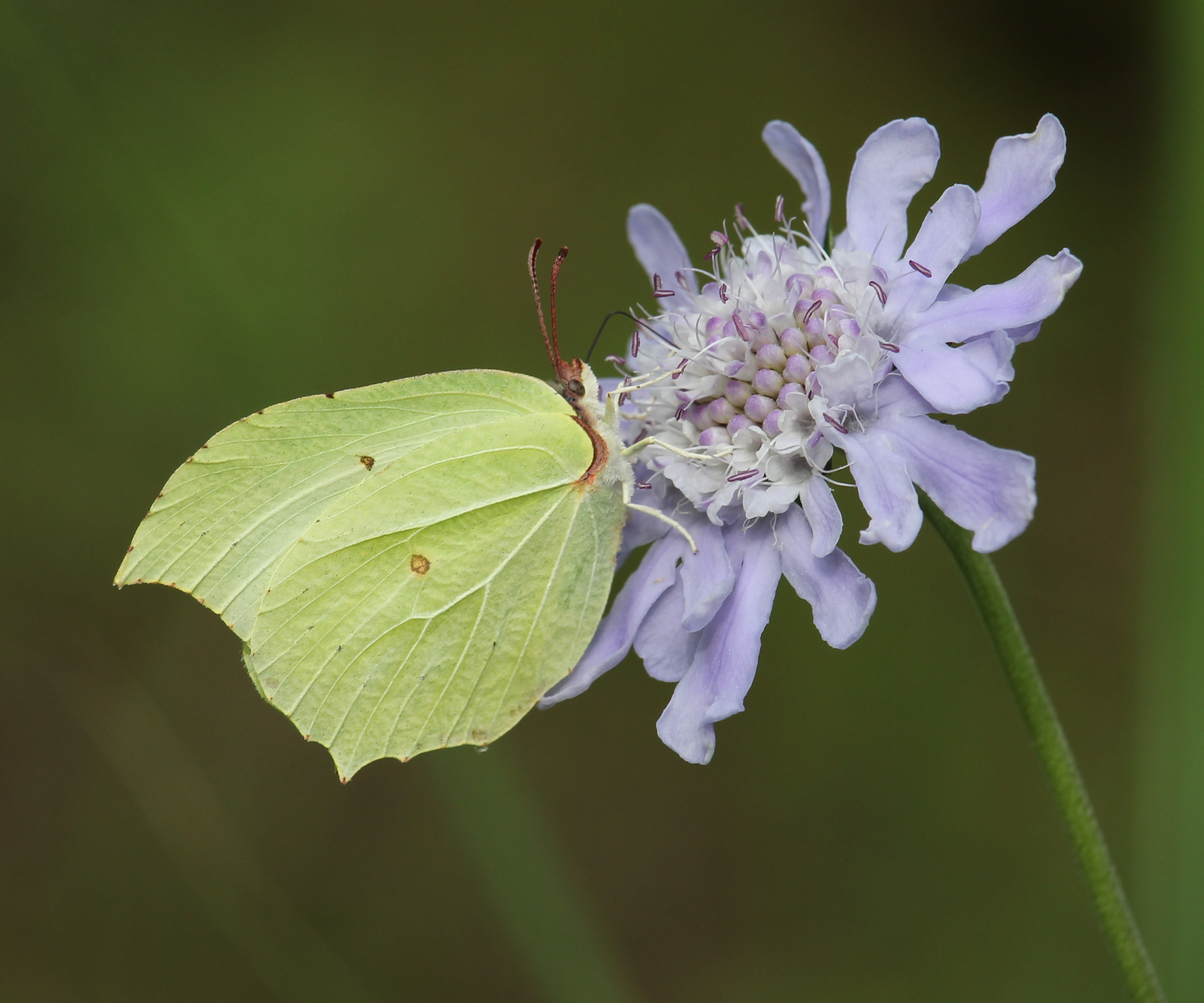
Gonepteryx mahaguru

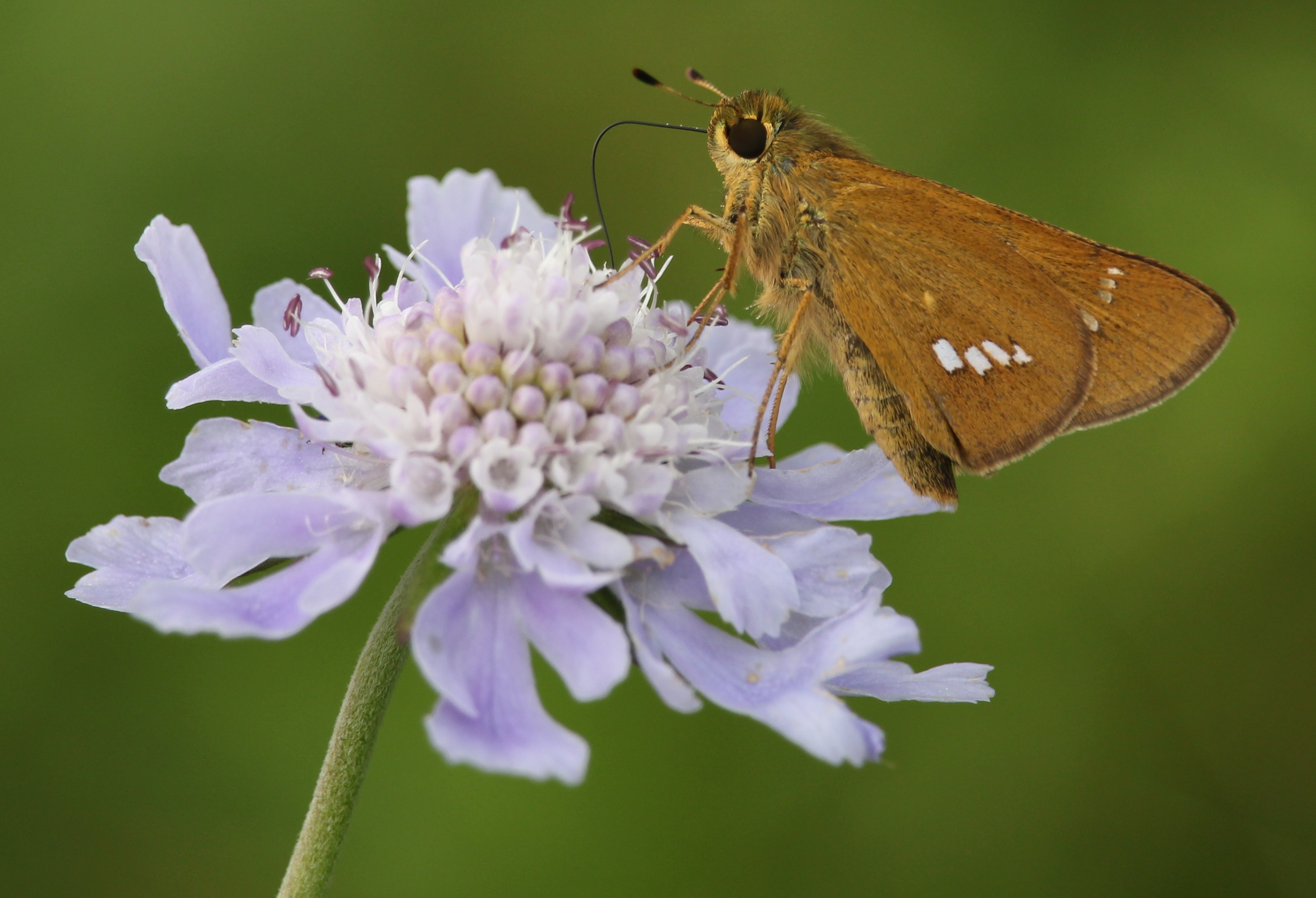
Parnara guttata

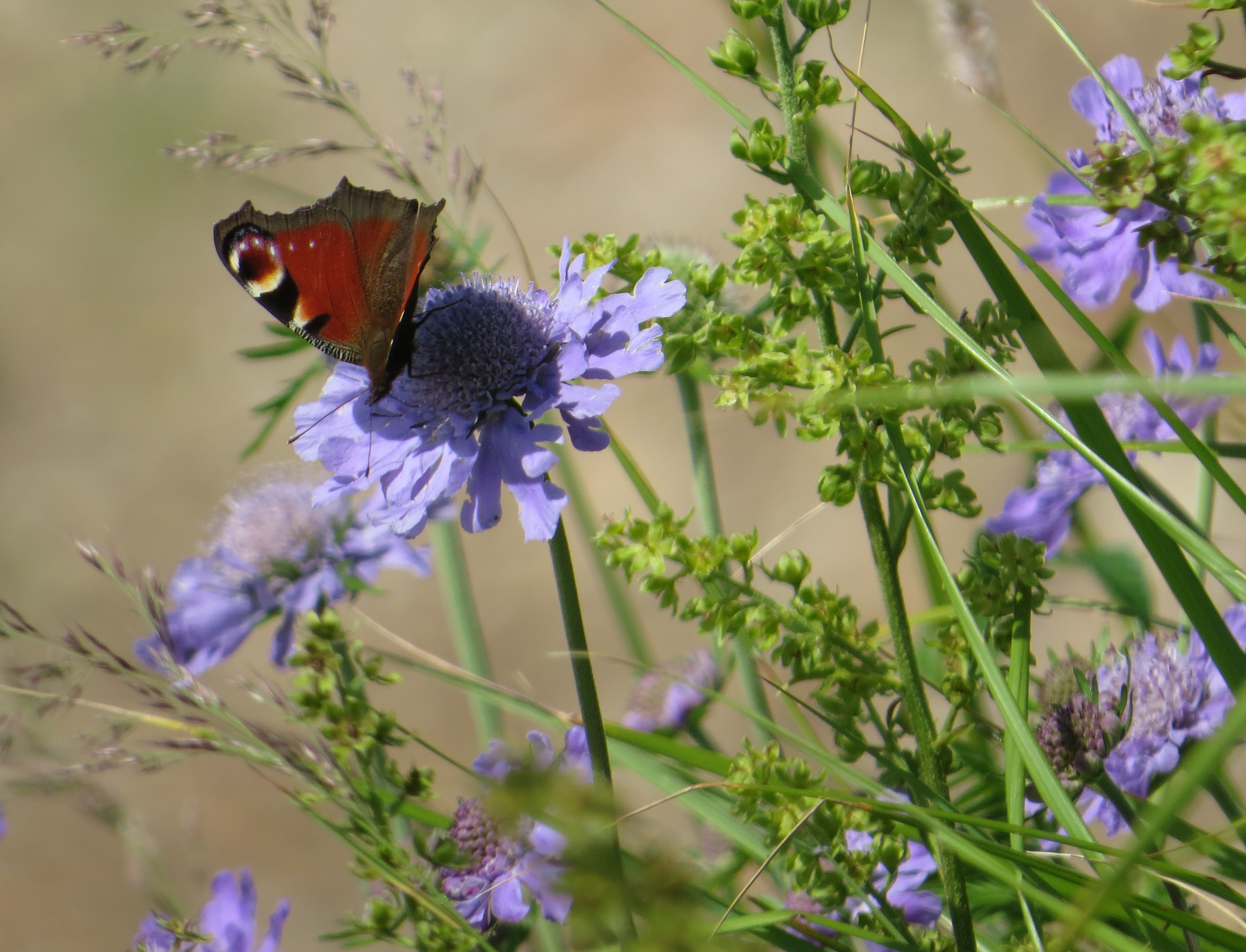
Aglais io
