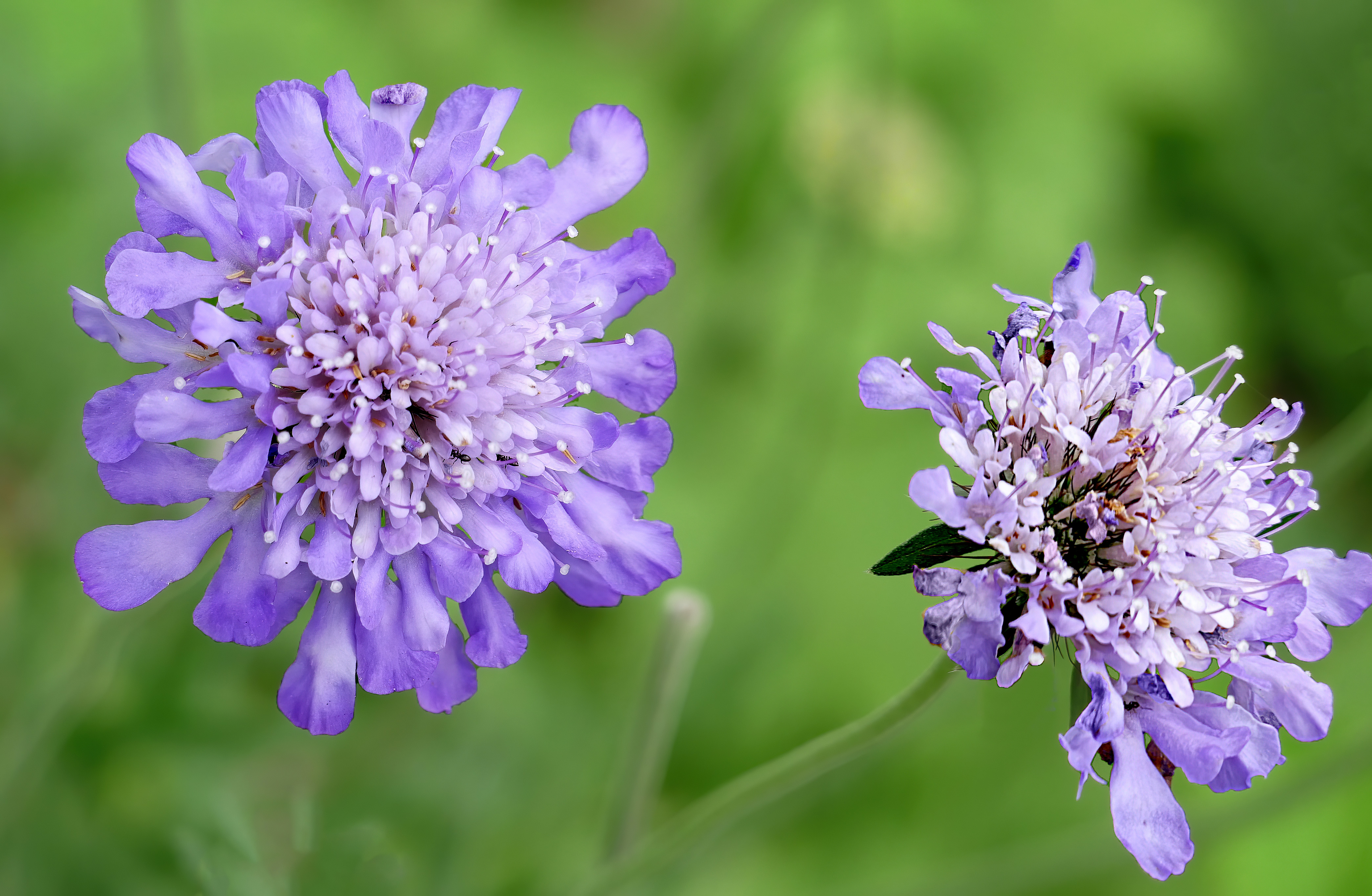
- Flower of Scabiosa triandra

Scientific classification
- Kingdom: Plantae
- Clade: Tracheophytes
- Clade: Angiosperms
- Clade: Eudicots
- Clade: Asterids
- Order: Dipsacales
- Family: Caprifoliaceae
- Genus: Scabiosa
- Species: S. triandra

Binomial name
- Scabiosa triandra L.

= Scabiosa triandra =

Species of flowering plant

Scabiosa triandra is a species of scabious belonging to the family Caprifoliaceae.

== Description ==
Scabiosa triandra can grow up to 1 metre (3 ft 3 in) in height. Flowering period extends from June to September.

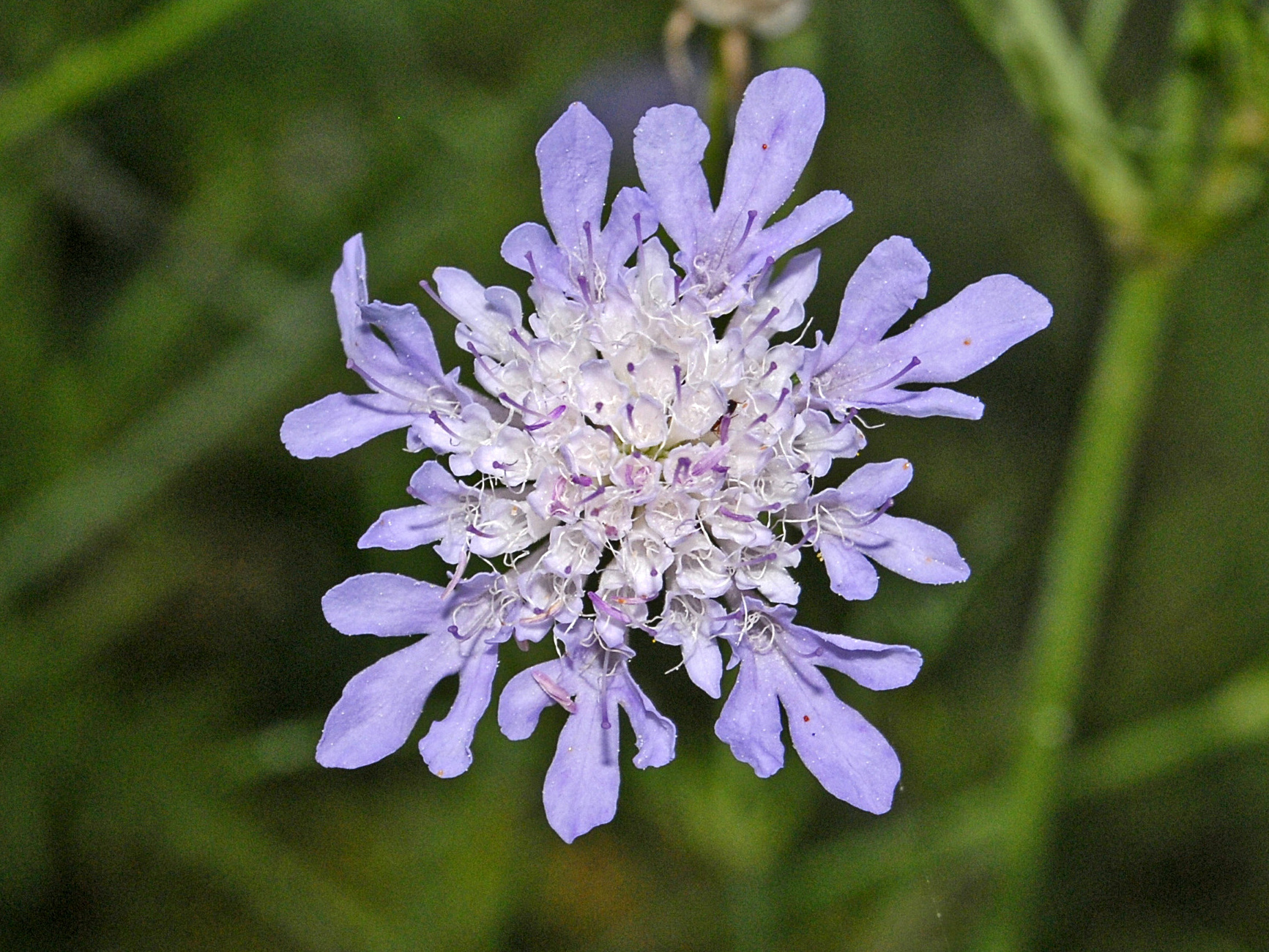
Flower of Scabiosa triandra at the Civico Orto Botanico di Trieste

== Distribution ==
This species can be found in Southern Europe.
