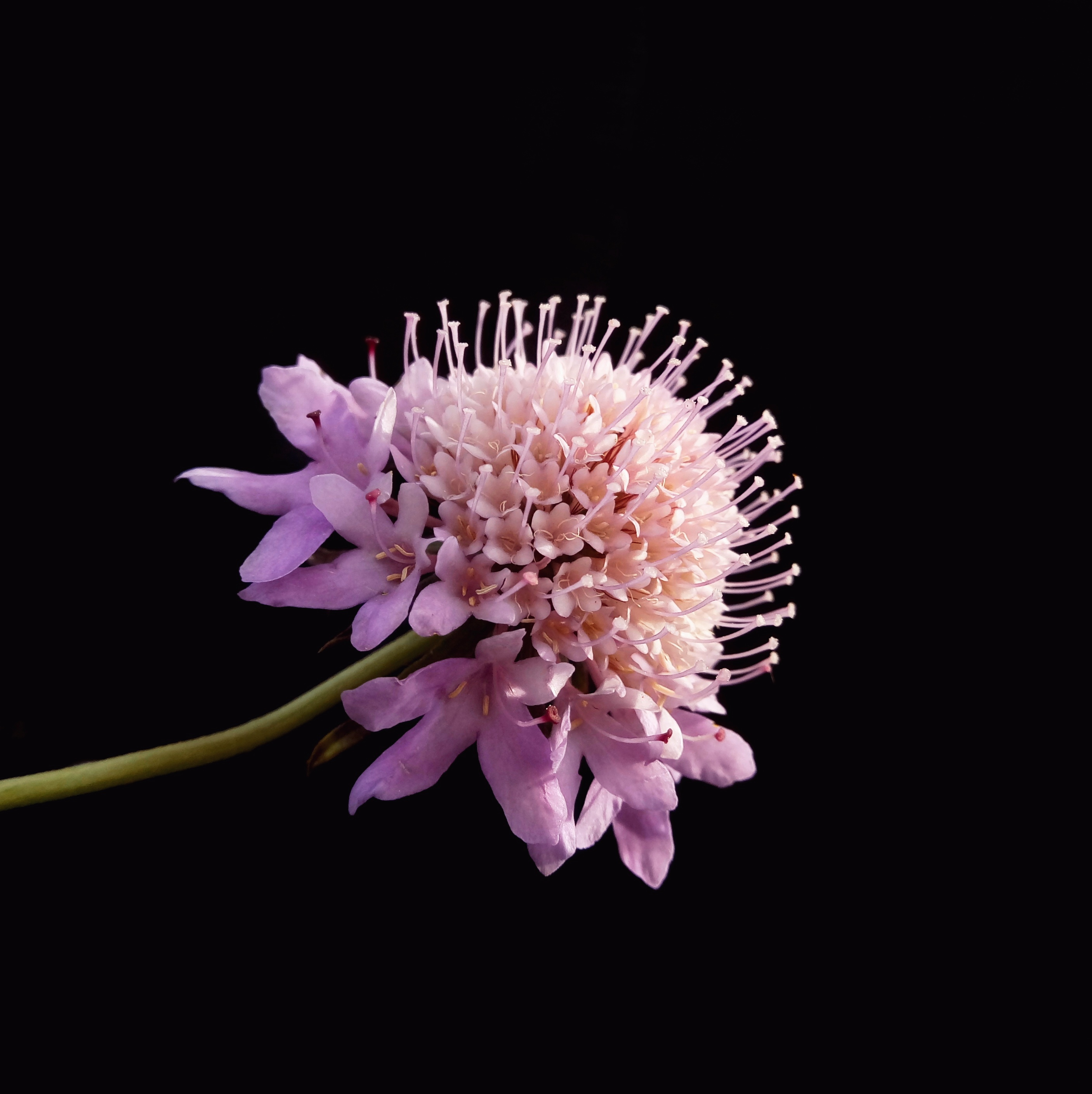
- Scabiosa atropurpurea subsp. maritima
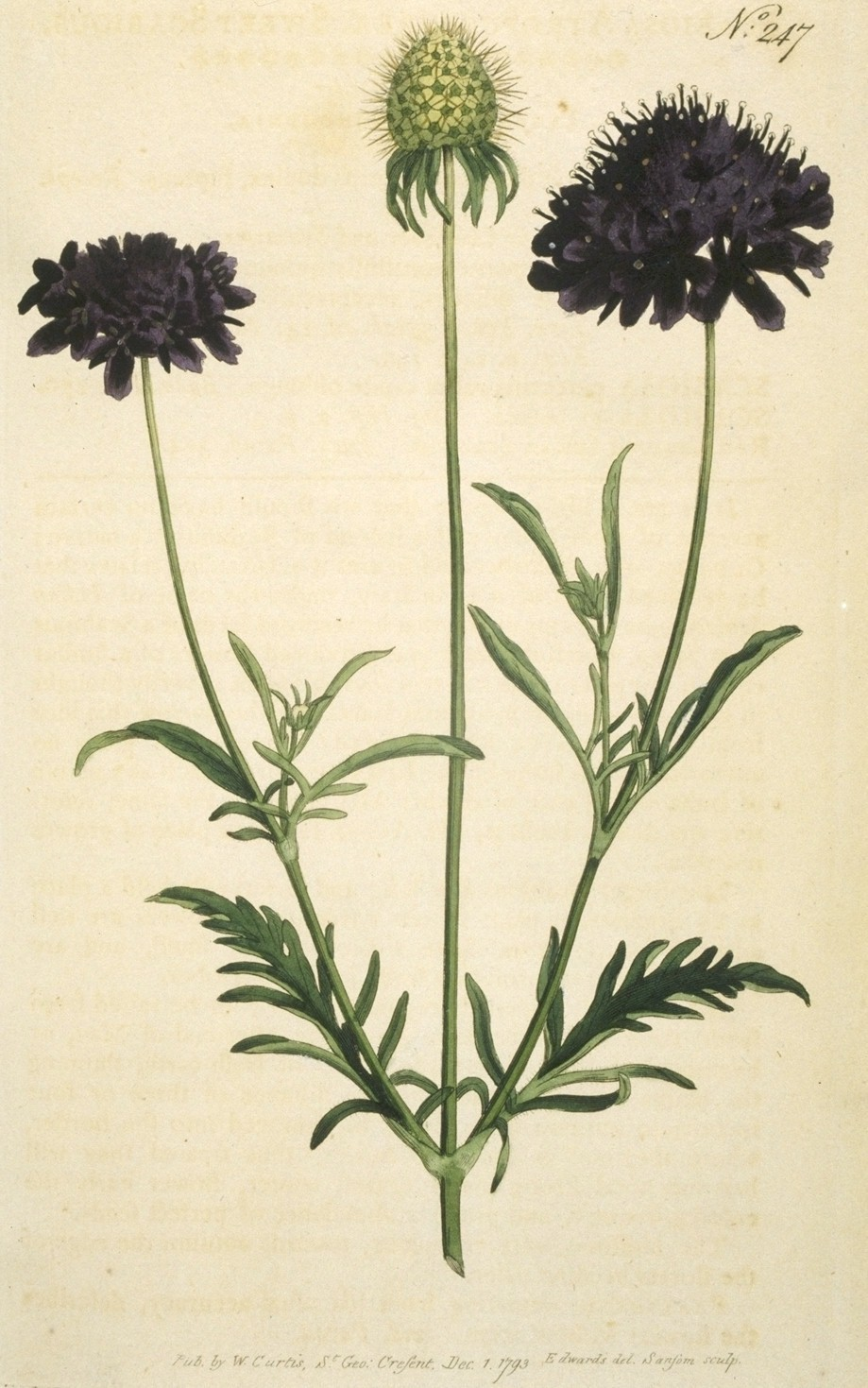
- Botanical illustration

Scientific classification
- Kingdom: Plantae
- Clade: Tracheophytes
- Clade: Angiosperms
- Clade: Eudicots
- Clade: Asterids
- Order: Dipsacales
- Family: Caprifoliaceae
- Genus: Scabiosa
- Species: S. atropurpurea

Binomial name
- Scabiosa atropurpurea L.

Synonyms
- List: Asterocephalus acutiflorus Rchb.; Asterocephalus ambiguus Rchb.; Asterocephalus atropurpureus (L.) Spreng.; Asterocephalus diffusus Spreng.; Asterocephalus grandiflorus Sweet; Asterocephalus maritimus (L.) Spreng.; Asterocephalus setifer Spreng.; Cyrtostemma atropurpureum (L.) Spach; Cyrtostemma maritimum (L.) Fourr.; Scabiosa acutiflora Rchb.; Scabiosa angulata Raf.; Scabiosa ateridoi Pau; Scabiosa atropurpurea var. villosa (Coss.) Franco; Scabiosa bailletii Timb.-Lagr.; Scabiosa calyptocarpa St.-Amans; Scabiosa cornucopia Viv.; Scabiosa cupanii Guss.; Scabiosa diffusa Rchb.; Scabiosa fruticulosa Gand.; Scabiosa grandiflora Guss.; Scabiosa grandiflora Scop.; Scabiosa integrata Hoffmanns. & Link; Scabiosa luteola Paolucci; Scabiosa major Vilm.; Scabiosa maritima L.; Scabiosa odora Salisb.; Scabiosa paui Sennen; Scabiosa rosea Steud.; Scabiosa saviana Rchb.; Scabiosa setifera Lam.; Scabiosa transsilvanica Spruner ex Nyman; Scabiosa vivipara Nees ex Steud.; Scabiosa wulfeniana Rchb.; Sclerostemma atropurpureum (L.) Schott; Sixalix atropurpurea (L.) Greuter & Burdet; Sixalix atropurpurea subsp. amansii (Rouy) Rivas Mart.; Sixalix atropurpurea subsp. grandiflora (Scop.) Soldano & F.Conti; Sixalix atropurpurea subsp. maritima (L.) Greuter & Burdet; Sixalix maritima (L.) Rottenst.; Spongostemma acutiflorum Tiegh.; Spongostemma atropurpureum (L.) Tiegh.; Spongostemma maritimum (L.) Tiegh.; Spongostemma savianum (Rchb.) Tiegh.

= Scabiosa atropurpurea =

Sweet scabious

Species of flowering plant

Scabiosa atropurpurea (syn. Sixalix atropurpurea), the mourningbride, mournful widow, pincushion flower, or sweet scabious, is an ornamental plant of the genus Scabiosa in the family Caprifoliaceae. It is native to southern Europe.

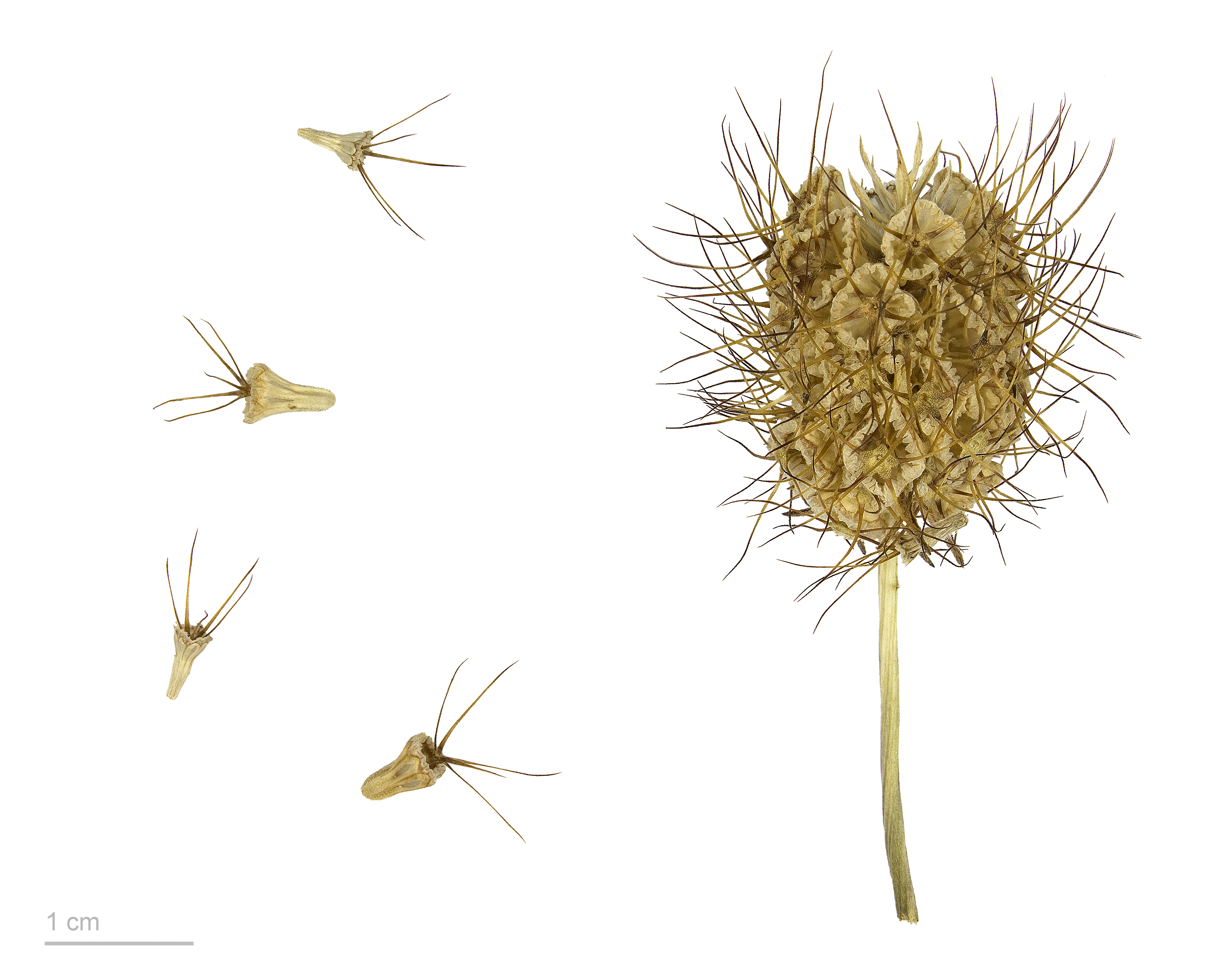
Scabiosa atropurpurea - MHNT

== Subtaxa ==
The following subtaxa are accepted:

- Scabiosa atropurpurea subsp. atropurpurea
- Scabiosa atropurpurea var. grandiflora (Scop.) Fiori & Paol.
- Scabiosa atropurpurea subsp. maritima (L.) Arcang.

== Description ==
Scabiosa atropurpurea has cauline leaves that are pinnately dissected, plants have red to purple flowers. It is native to southern Europe. It propagates by seeds which are dispersed by animals.

== Cultivation ==
It prefers cooler climates; high temperatures and humidity negatively impact its growth. Scabiosa atropurpurea grows best in rich, alkaline soils high in organic matter with good drainage. It makes a good cut flower. Scabiosa atropurpurea 'Beaujolais Bonnets' is a cultivar grown for its long blooming period and burgundy flowers.

== Invasive species ==
It has become an invasive species outside of its native range, including the US state of California where it has invaded grasslands. It ranks as one of South Australia's most commonly recorded weeds.
