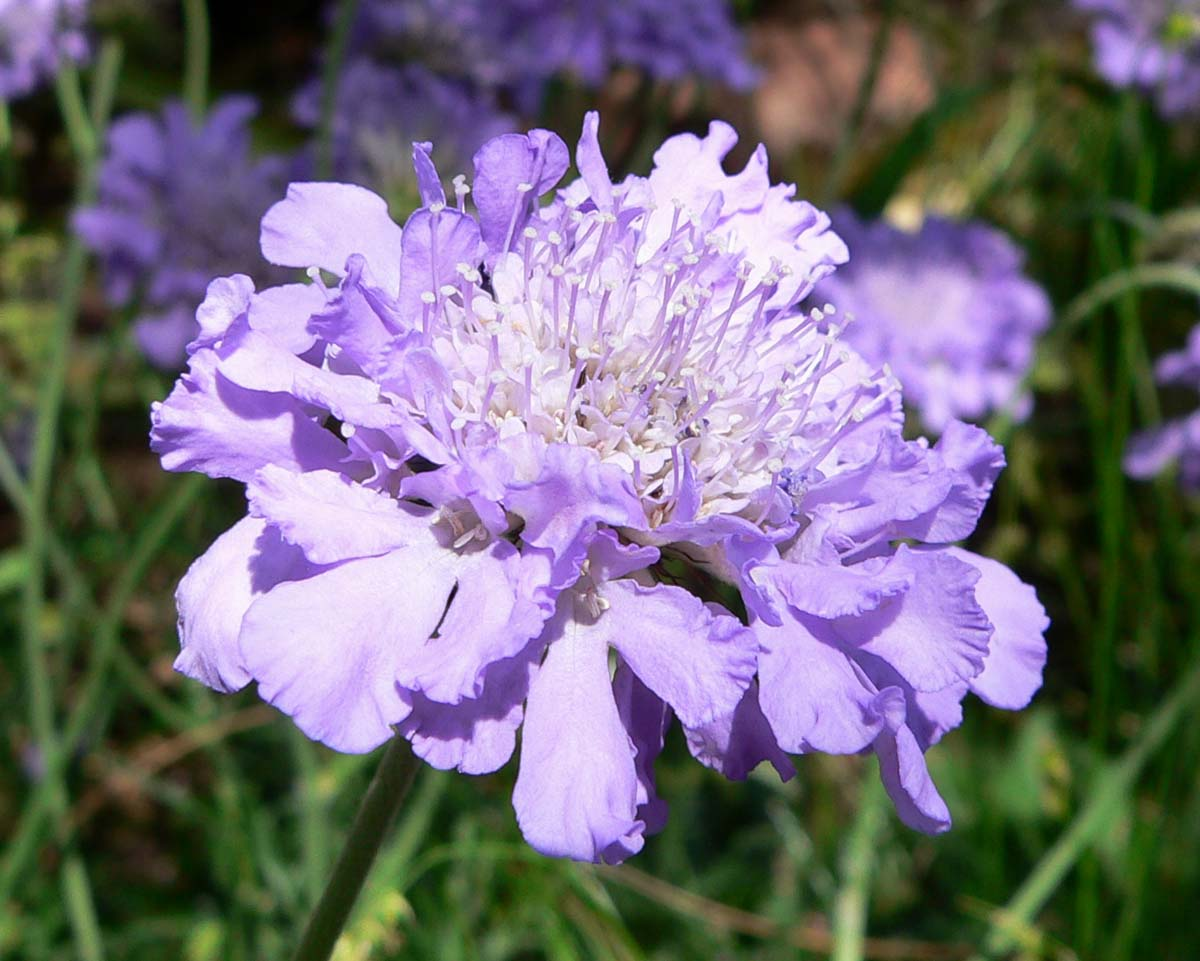
- 'Butterfly Blue' cultivar
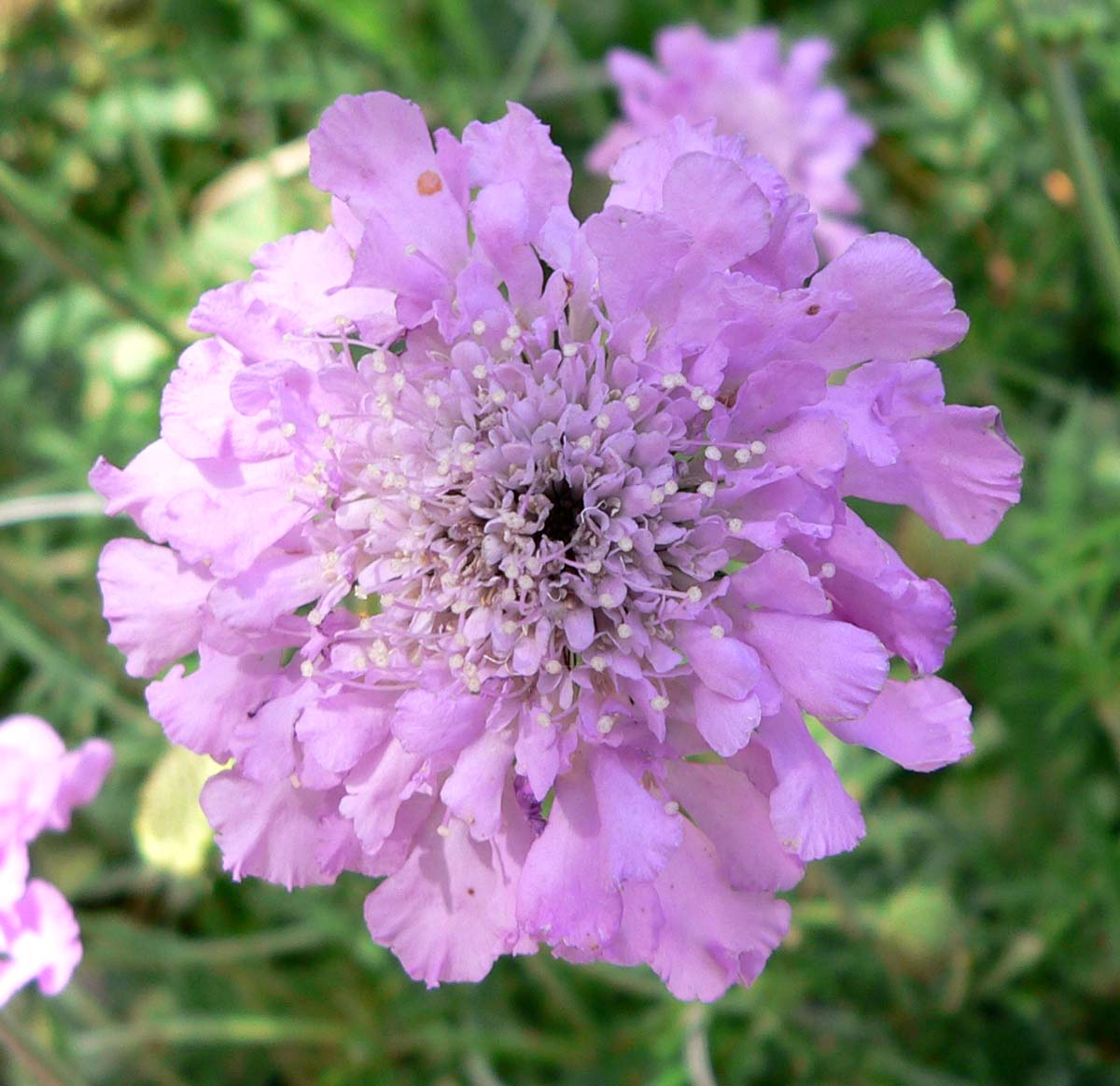
- 'Pink Mist' cultivar

Scientific classification
- Kingdom: Plantae
- Clade: Embryophytes
- Clade: Tracheophytes
- Clade: Angiosperms
- Clade: Eudicots
- Clade: Asterids
- Order: Dipsacales
- Family: Caprifoliaceae
- Genus: Scabiosa
- Species: S. columbaria

Binomial name
- Scabiosa columbaria L.

Synonyms
- List: Asterocephalus amoenus Spreng.; Asterocephalus columbaria (L.) Wallr.; Asterocephalus mollissimus Spreng.; Asterocephalus pumilus Spreng.; Asterocephalus pyrenaicus Sweet; Columbaria minor Gray; Columbaria patens Fourr.; Columbaria rubella Opiz ex Steud.; Columbaria vulgaris J.Presl & C.Presl; Scabiosa acaulis Thunb.; Scabiosa amoena J.Jacq.; Scabiosa balbinii Sennen & Elías; Scabiosa bellidis-folia Gilib.; Scabiosa brigantiaca Jord.; Scabiosa caerulea Gueldenst.; Scabiosa caesaraugustana Echeand.; Scabiosa columbaria f. pilosa Gamisans; Scabiosa columbaria subsp. tineensis M.Laínz; Scabiosa communis Rouy; Scabiosa commutata Roem. & Schult.; Scabiosa crassicaula E.Mey.; Scabiosa crenata Lucé; Scabiosa grisea (Sommier & Levier) Grossh.; Scabiosa hyrcanica Steven; Scabiosa koelzii Rech.f.; Scabiosa laciniata Licht. ex Roem. & Schult.; Scabiosa levieri Porta; Scabiosa longepedunculata Hornem.; Scabiosa longicincta Pau; Scabiosa nitida Bernh. ex Roem. & Schult.; Scabiosa nudicaulis Lam.; Scabiosa orophila Timb.-Lagr. & Jeanb.; Scabiosa pallida E.Mey.; Scabiosa patens Jord.; Scabiosa peduncularis Rouy; Scabiosa permixta Jord. ex Boreau; Scabiosa polymorpha Weigel; Scabiosa pumila Burm.f.; Scabiosa purpurea Sulak.; Scabiosa rubella Opiz ex Mert. & W.D.J.Koch; Scabiosa spreta Jord.; Scabiosa subalpina Brügger; Scabiosa thunbergii Roem. & Schult.; Scabiosa tolosana Timb.-Lagr. & Jeanb.; Sclerostemma columbarium (L.) Schott; Succisa columbaria (L.) Moench

= Scabiosa columbaria =

Species of flowering plant

Scabiosa columbaria, called the small scabious or dwarf pincushion flower, is a widespread species of flowering plant in the genus Scabiosa, native to Europe, Africa, and western Asia, from Sweden to Angola. In the garden it is a short-lived deciduous perennial. In the wild in Europe it prefers to grow in calcareous grasslands.

Growing to 1 m (3.3 ft) tall by 0.5 m (1.6 ft), it has simple branched grey-green leaves, and pale lavender or blue multi-petalled flowers from summer to autumn.

== Subspecies ==
The following subspecies are currently accepted:

- Scabiosa columbaria subsp. banatica (Waldst. & Kit.) Diklic
- Scabiosa columbaria subsp. caespitosa Jamzad
- Scabiosa columbaria subsp. columbaria
- Scabiosa columbaria subsp. pratensis (St.-Lag.) Braun-Blanq.
