= Succisa pentaphylla =

Scientific classification
- Kingdom: Plantae
- Clade: Tracheophytes
- Clade: Angiosperms
- Clade: Eudicots
- Clade: Asterids
- Order: Dipsacales
- Family: Caprifoliaceae
- Genus: Succisa
- Species: S. pentaphylla

Binomial name
- Succisa pentaphylla Moench

Species of flowering plant

Succisa pentaphylla is a species in the honeysuckle family. It was first described by German botanist Conrad Moench.
