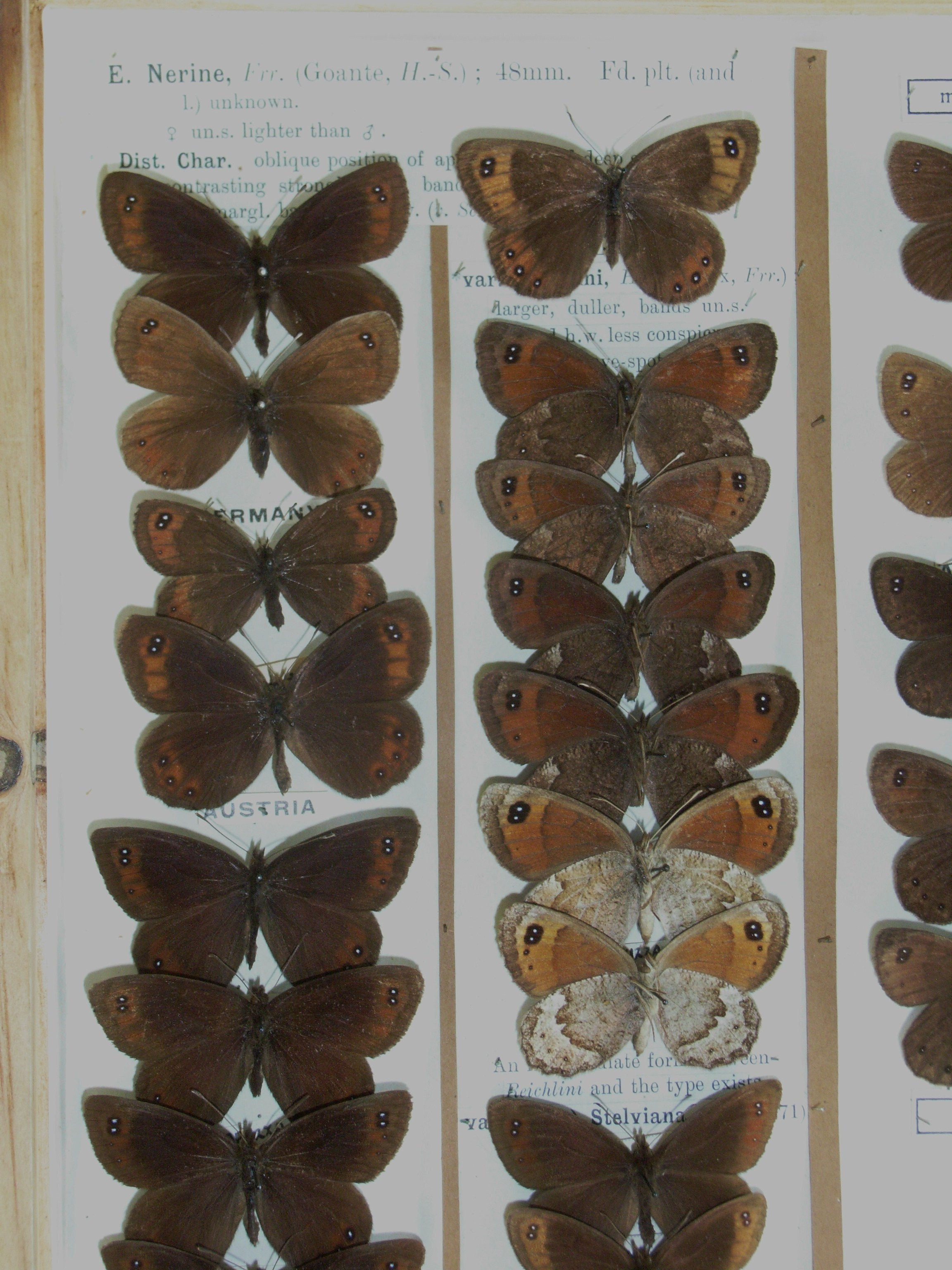

Scientific classification
- Kingdom: Animalia
- Phylum: Arthropoda
- Clade: Pancrustacea
- Class: Insecta
- Order: Lepidoptera
- Family: Nymphalidae
- Genus: Erebia
- Species: E. neriene

Binomial name
- Erebia neriene (Böber, 1809)

Synonyms
- Erebia sedakovii Eversmann, 1847; Erebia sedakovii r. sajanensis Warren, 1931; Erebia sedakovii septorientalis Goltz, 1934

= Erebia neriene =

Species of butterfly

Erebia neriene is an East Palearctic species of satyrine butterfly found in Altai, Siberia, Ussuri, northern China and Korea.

The larva feeds on Calamagrostis, Dactylis, Poa, Festuca and Carex species.

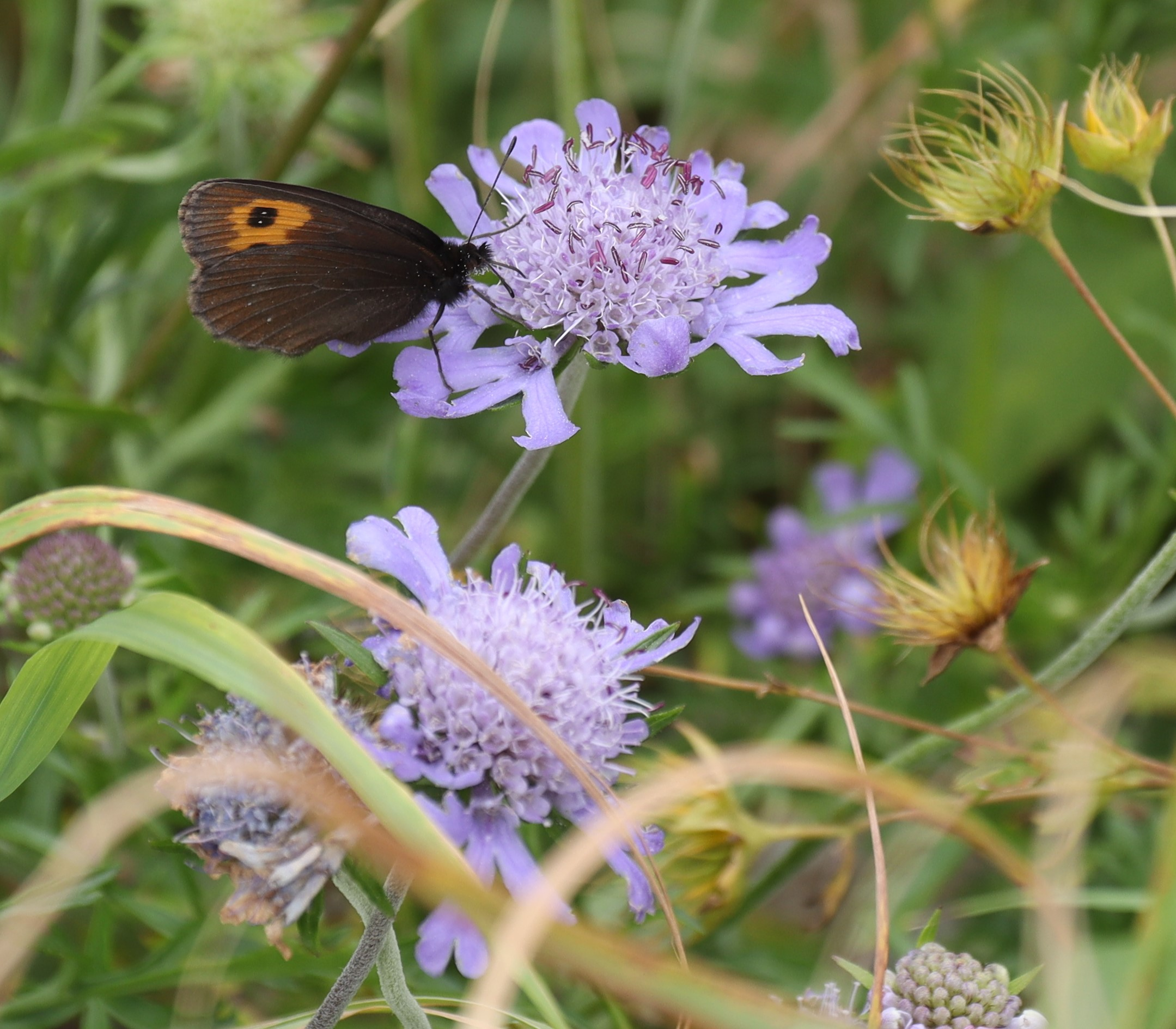
On Scabiosa japonica

== Subspecies ==
- E. n. neriene (Altai, Sayan, Transbaikalia)
- E. n. alcmenides Sheljuzhko, 1919 (Amur, Ussuri)
