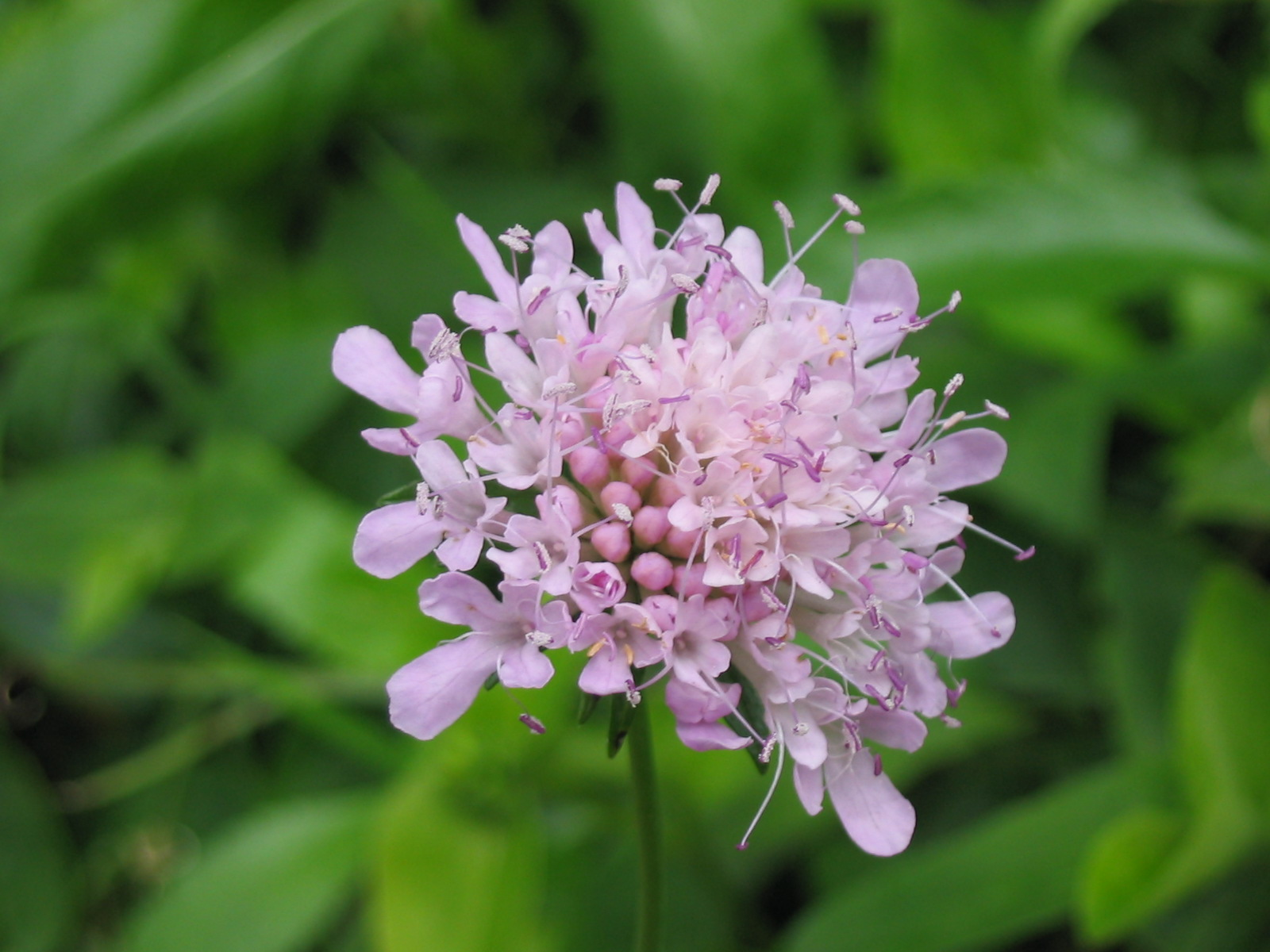

Scientific classification
- Kingdom: Plantae
- Clade: Tracheophytes
- Clade: Angiosperms
- Clade: Eudicots
- Clade: Asterids
- Order: Dipsacales
- Family: Caprifoliaceae
- Genus: Scabiosa
- Species: S. nitens

Binomial name
- Scabiosa nitens Roem. & Schult.

= Scabiosa nitens =

Species of flowering plant

Scabiosa nitens is a species of flowering plant in the family Caprifoliaceae endemic to the Azores. It is found in coastal cliffs, but also rocks and steep slopes inland. It is present in Santa Maria, São Miguel, São Jorge, Pico Flores and Corvo and is probably extinct on Faial.

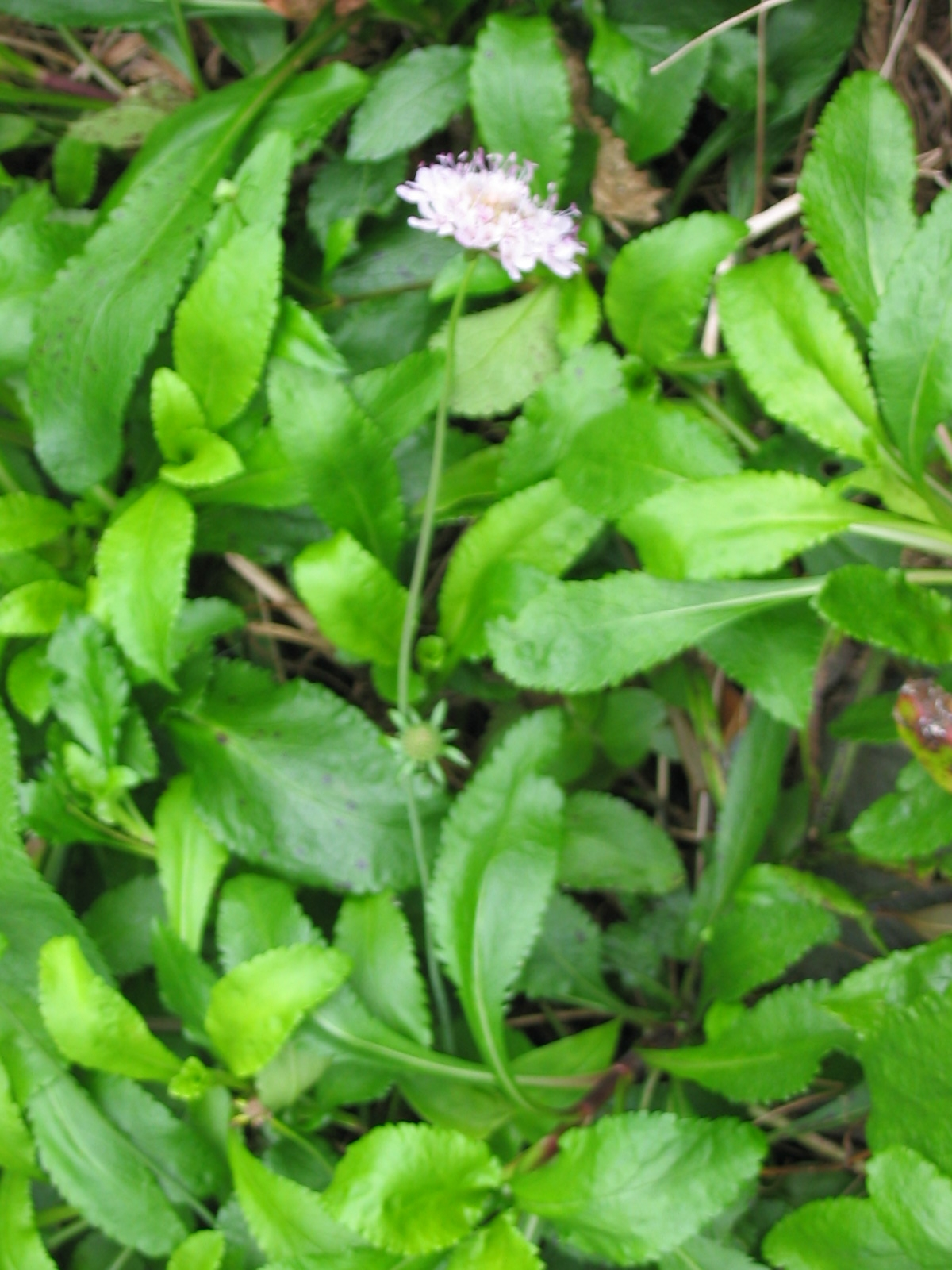
