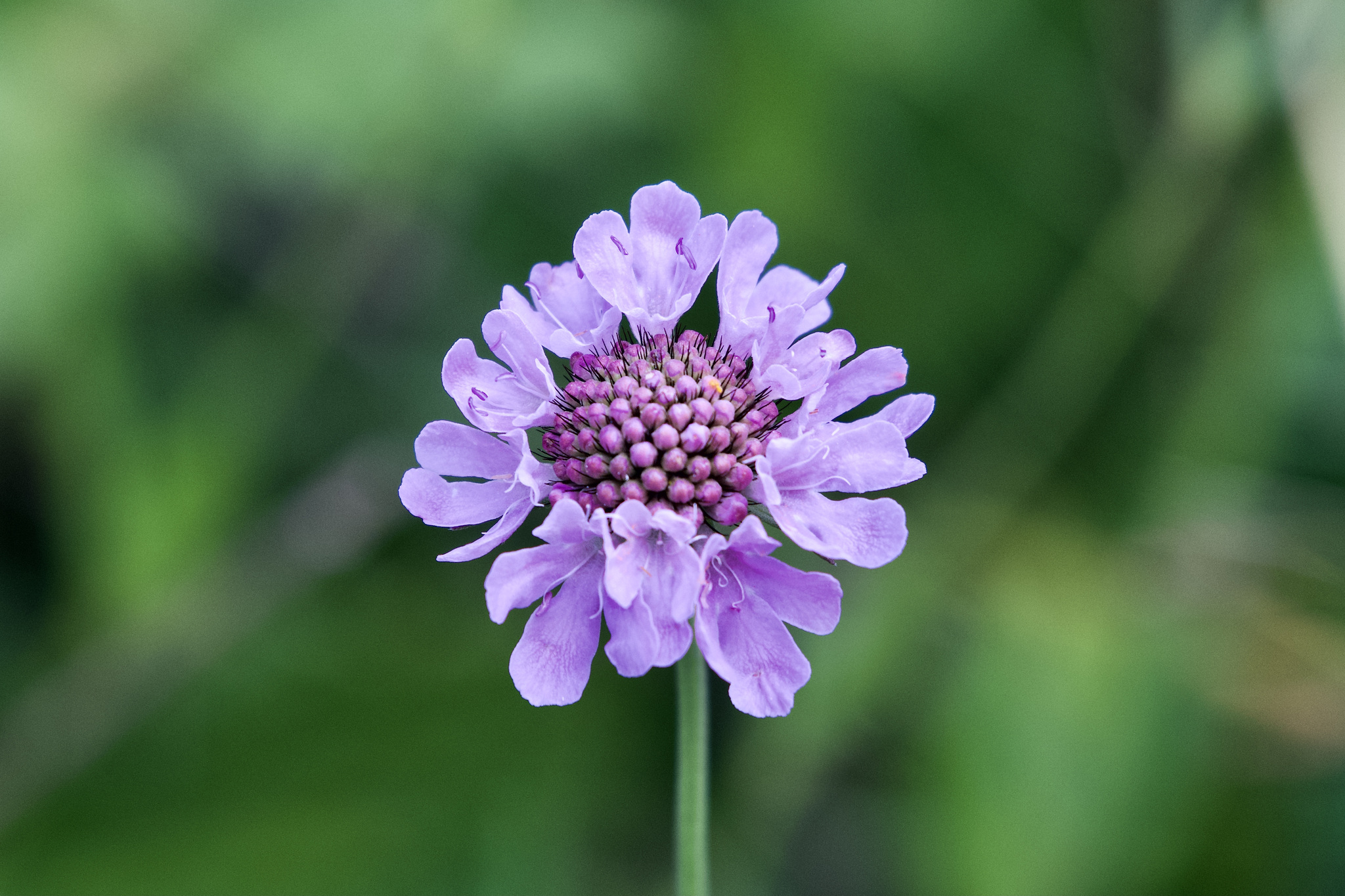

Scientific classification
- Kingdom: Plantae
- Clade: Tracheophytes
- Clade: Angiosperms
- Clade: Eudicots
- Clade: Asterids
- Order: Dipsacales
- Family: Caprifoliaceae
- Genus: Scabiosa
- Species: S. lucida

Binomial name
- Scabiosa lucida Villars (1779)

= Scabiosa lucida =

Species of plant

Scabiosa lucida, commonly known as shining scabious, is a species of flowering plants in the honeysuckle family (Caprifoliaceae).

== Taxonomy ==
Scabiosa lucida contains the following subspecies:

- Scabiosa lucida stricta
- Scabiosa lucida lucida
- Scabiosa lucida pseudobanatica
