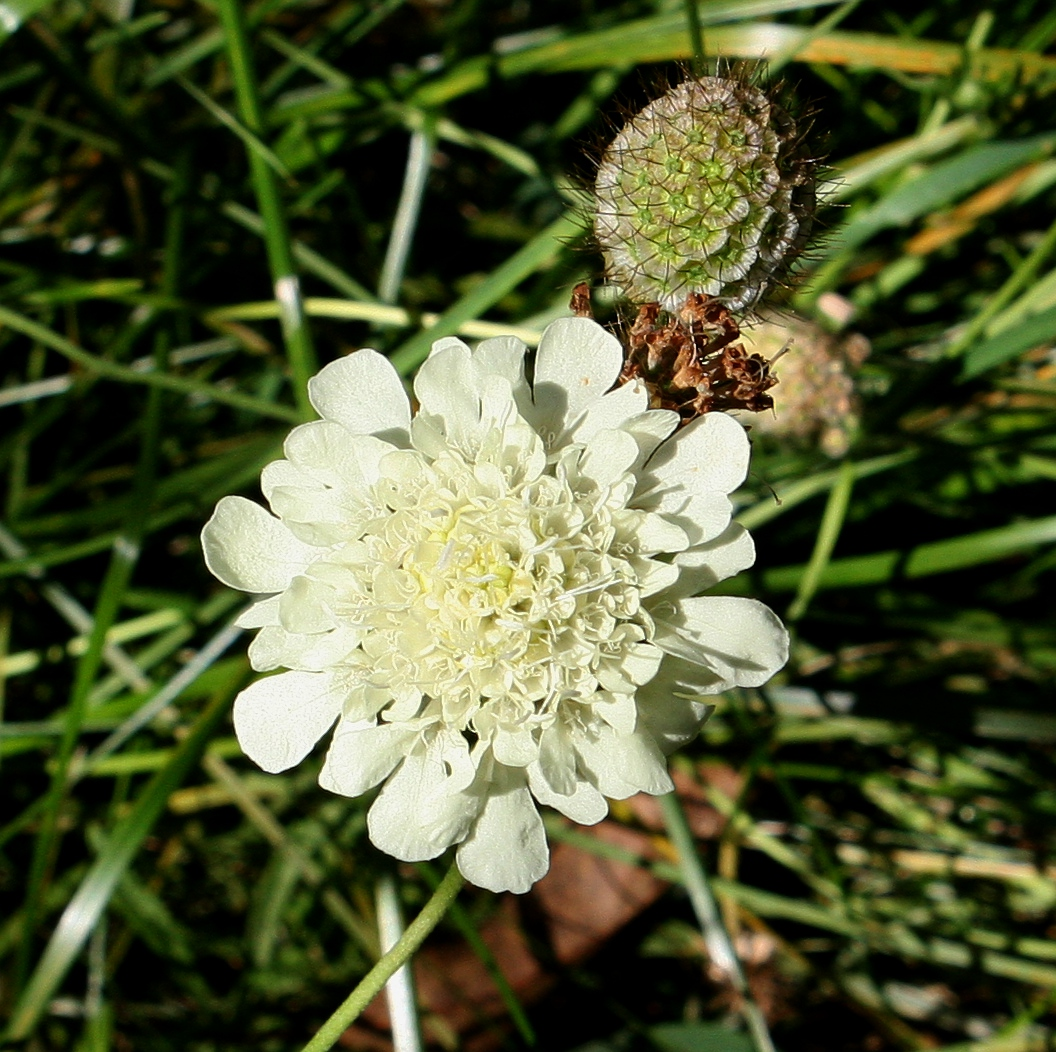

Scientific classification
- Kingdom: Plantae
- Clade: Tracheophytes
- Clade: Angiosperms
- Clade: Eudicots
- Clade: Asterids
- Order: Dipsacales
- Family: Caprifoliaceae
- Genus: Scabiosa
- Species: S. ochroleuca

Binomial name
- Scabiosa ochroleuca L.

= Scabiosa ochroleuca =

Species of flowering plant

Scabiosa ochroleuca, commonly known as cream pincushions or cream scabious, is a species of flowering plant in the honeysuckle family (Caprifoliaceae), characterized by its creamy yellow flower heads. It is native to Europe and western Asia, where it typically grows in grasslands, meadows, and open woodlands.
