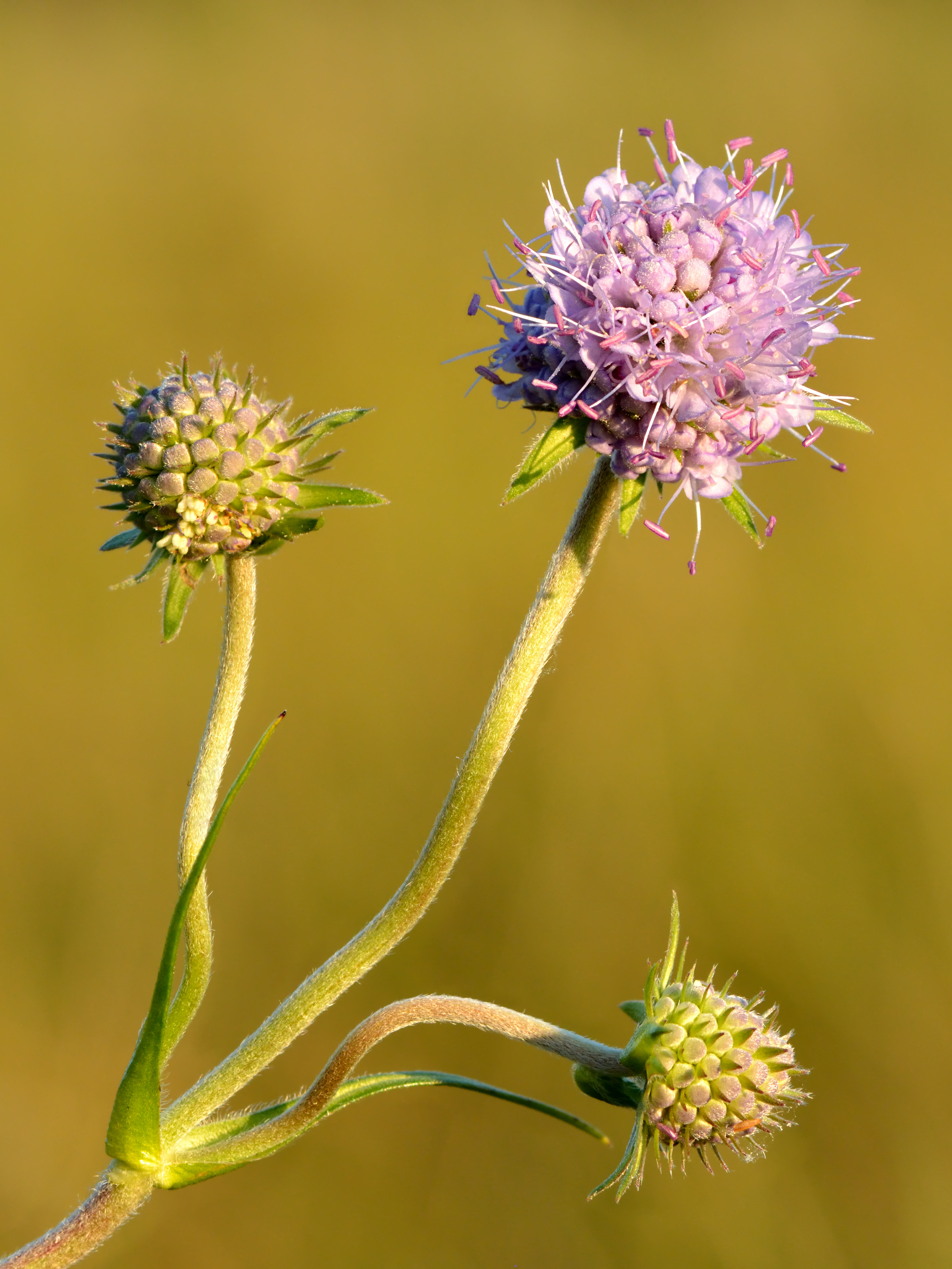
- Succisa pratensis (devil's-bit scabious)

Scientific classification
- Kingdom: Plantae
- Clade: Embryophytes
- Clade: Tracheophytes
- Clade: Spermatophytes
- Clade: Angiosperms
- Clade: Eudicots
- Clade: Asterids
- Order: Dipsacales
- Family: Caprifoliaceae
- Subfamily: Dipsacoideae
- Genus: Succisa; Haller

Species
- See text

= Succisa =

Genus of flowering plants in the honeysuckle family

Succisa is a genus of flowering plants in the family Caprifoliaceae.

Species include the devil's-bit scabious, Succisa pratensis.

== Species ==
As of September 2020, Plants of the World Online accepted three species:

- Succisa pinnatifida Lange
- Succisa pratensis Moench
- Succisa trichotocephala Baksay
